= Mottramite =

Orthorhombic anhydrous vanadate hydroxide mineral

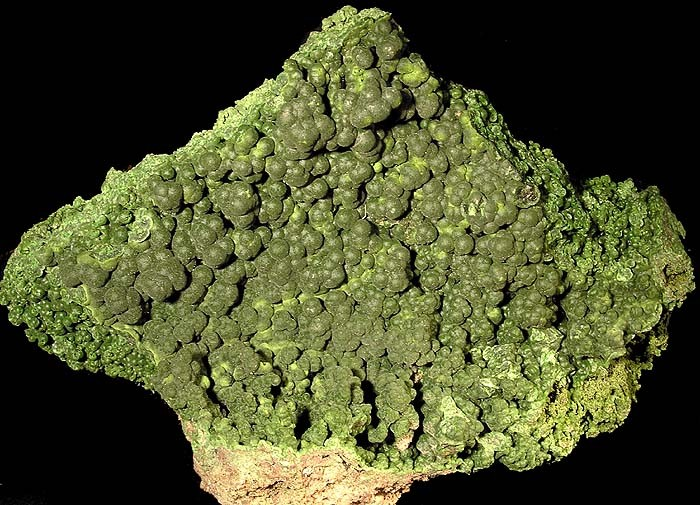

General
- Category: Vanadate minerals
- Formula: PbCu(VO_{4})(OH)
- IMA symbol: Mott
- Strunz classification: 8.BH.40
- Dana classification: 41.5.2.2
- Crystal system: Orthorhombic
- Crystal class: Dipyramidal (mmm); H-M symbol: (2/m 2/m 2/m)
- Space group: Pnma
- Unit cell: a = 7.68 Å, b = 9.27 Å, c = 6.03 Å; Z = 4

Identification
- Formula mass: 402.69 g/mol
- Colour: Grass-green, olive-green, yellow-green, siskin-green, blackish brown, nearly black
- Crystal habit: Encrustations, aggregates of plume-like forms and radial crystals
- Cleavage: None observed
- Fracture: Irregular/uneven, sub-conchoidal
- Tenacity: Brittle
- Mohs scale hardness: 3 – 3 1/2
- Lustre: Greasy
- Streak: Yellowish green
- Diaphaneity: Transparent, opaque
- Specific gravity: 5.9
- Optical properties: Usually biaxial (−) rarely biaxial (+)
- Refractive index: n_{α} = 2.170(2) n_{β} = 2.260(2) n_{γ} = 2.320(2)
- Birefringence: δ = 0.150
- Pleochroism: Visible X=Y= canary yellow to greenish yellow, Z= brownish yellow
- 2V angle: Measured: 73°, calculated: 46°
- Dispersion: Strong r > v rarely r < v
- Solubility: Readily soluble in acids
- Common impurities: Zinc

Mottramite is an orthorhombic anhydrous vanadate hydroxide mineral, PbCu(VO_{4})(OH), at the copper end of the descloizite subgroup. It was formerly called cuprodescloizite or psittacinite (this mineral characterized in 1868 by Frederick Augustus Genth). Duhamelite is a calcium- and bismuth-bearing variety of mottramite, typically with acicular habit.

Mottramite is a member of the adelite-descloizite group. Mottramite, which is a copper rich member, forms a series with descloizite, which is a zinc rich member. These two minerals usually contain significant percentages of both copper and zinc and are seldom pure. Mottramite also forms a series with duftite.

It was discovered in 1876 and named for the locality, Mottram St Andrew, Cheshire, England, where ore was stockpiled, although it was probably mined from Pim Hill Mine, Shrewsbury, Shropshire, England.

== Crystallography ==
Mottramite is an orthorhombic mineral belonging to the crystal class 2/m 2/m 2/m, with space group Pnma. The unit cell has sides of lengths a = 7.6 to 7.7 Å, b = 9.2 to 9.5 Å and c = 6.0 to 6.1 Å. There are four formula units per unit cell (Z = 4), the molar mass is 402.69 g and the calculated density is 6.19 g/cm^{3}. The structure is composed of chains of edge-sharing CuO_{6} octahedra and very distorted Pb(O,OH)_{8} polyhedra linked through VO_{4} groups into a tight three-dimensional network.

== Appearance ==
Drusy crusts of tiny intergrown crystals are common, also encrustations and mammillary or botryoidal surfaces. The crystals are equant dipyramids or prisms parallel to the c crystal axis, but always microscopic. The colour is various shades of green, yellow-green, blackish brown or nearly black. Crystals often grow step by step, with the different steps or zones having different colours. The streak is yellowish green, or yellow, and the crystals are transparent to opaque, with a greasy lustre.

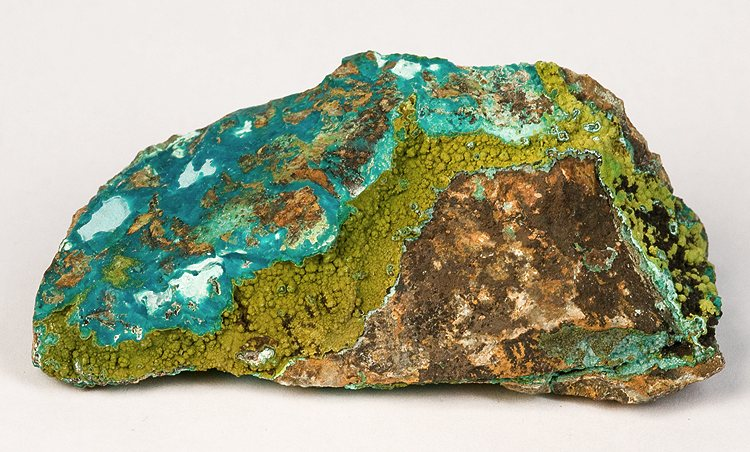
Mottramite (green) with chrysocolla (blue) from Mono County, California, US

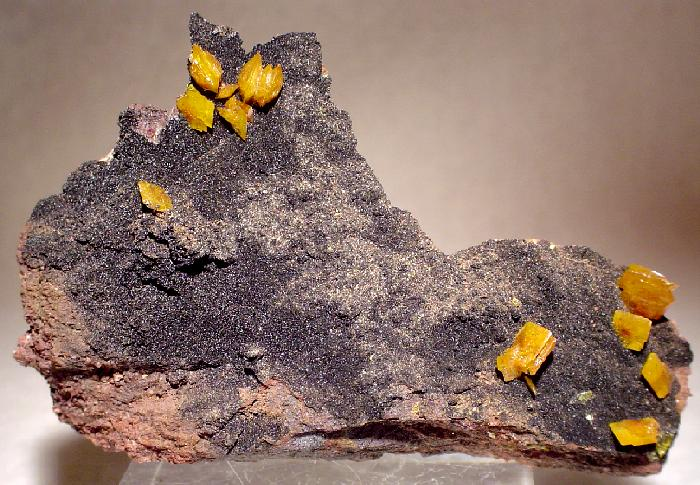
Orange wulfenite on dark grey mottramite from Gila County, Arizona, USA

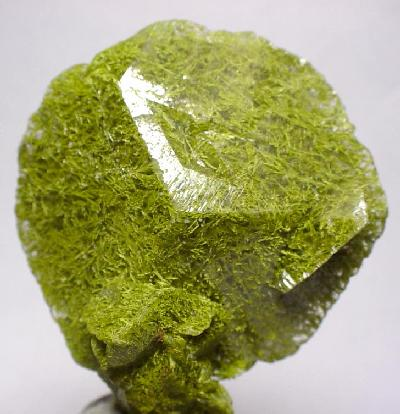
Calcite (white) covered by green mottramite from Tsumeb, Namibia

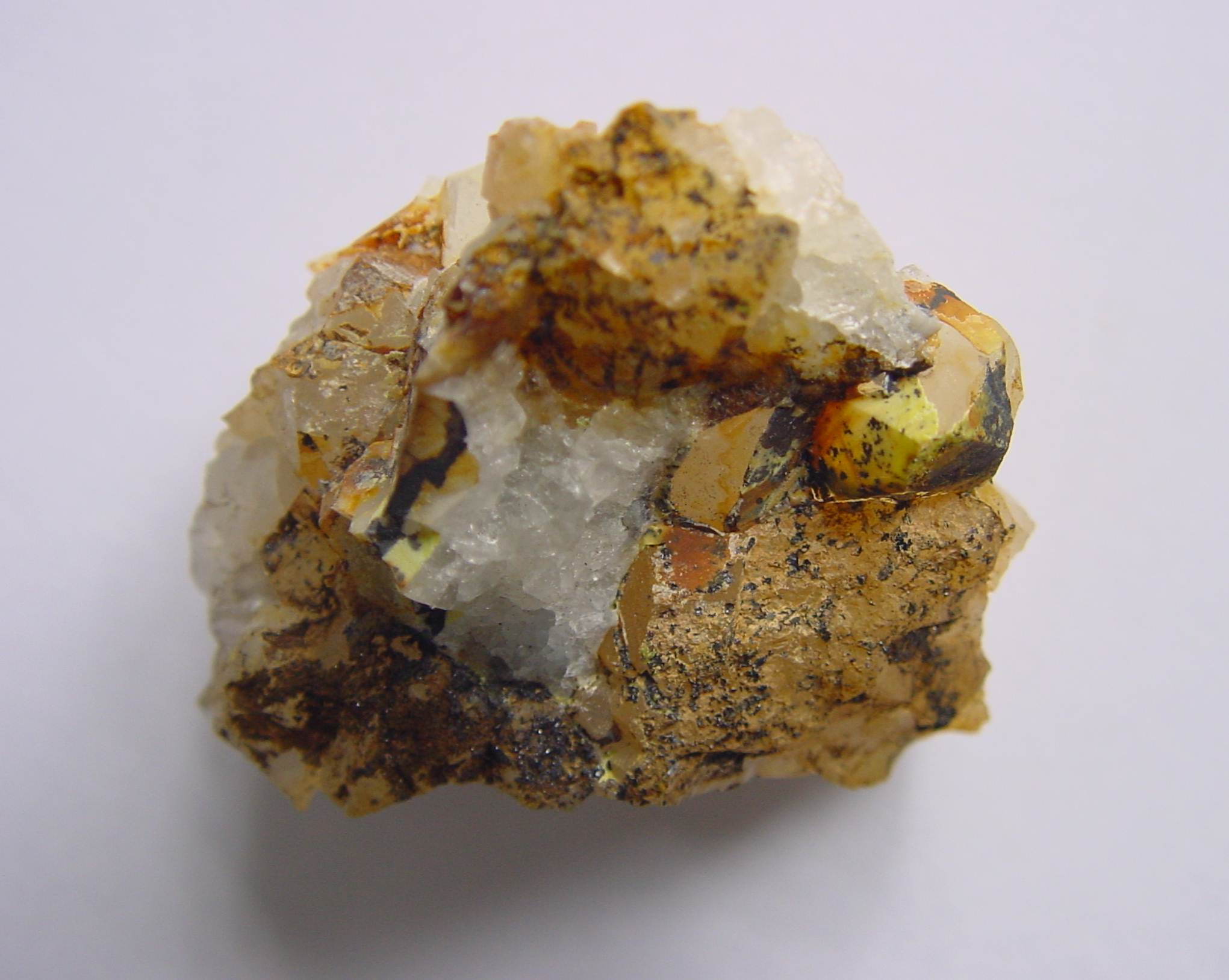
Quartz matrix with a partial coverage of dark brown mottramite from Arm O'Grain, Caldbeck Fells, UK

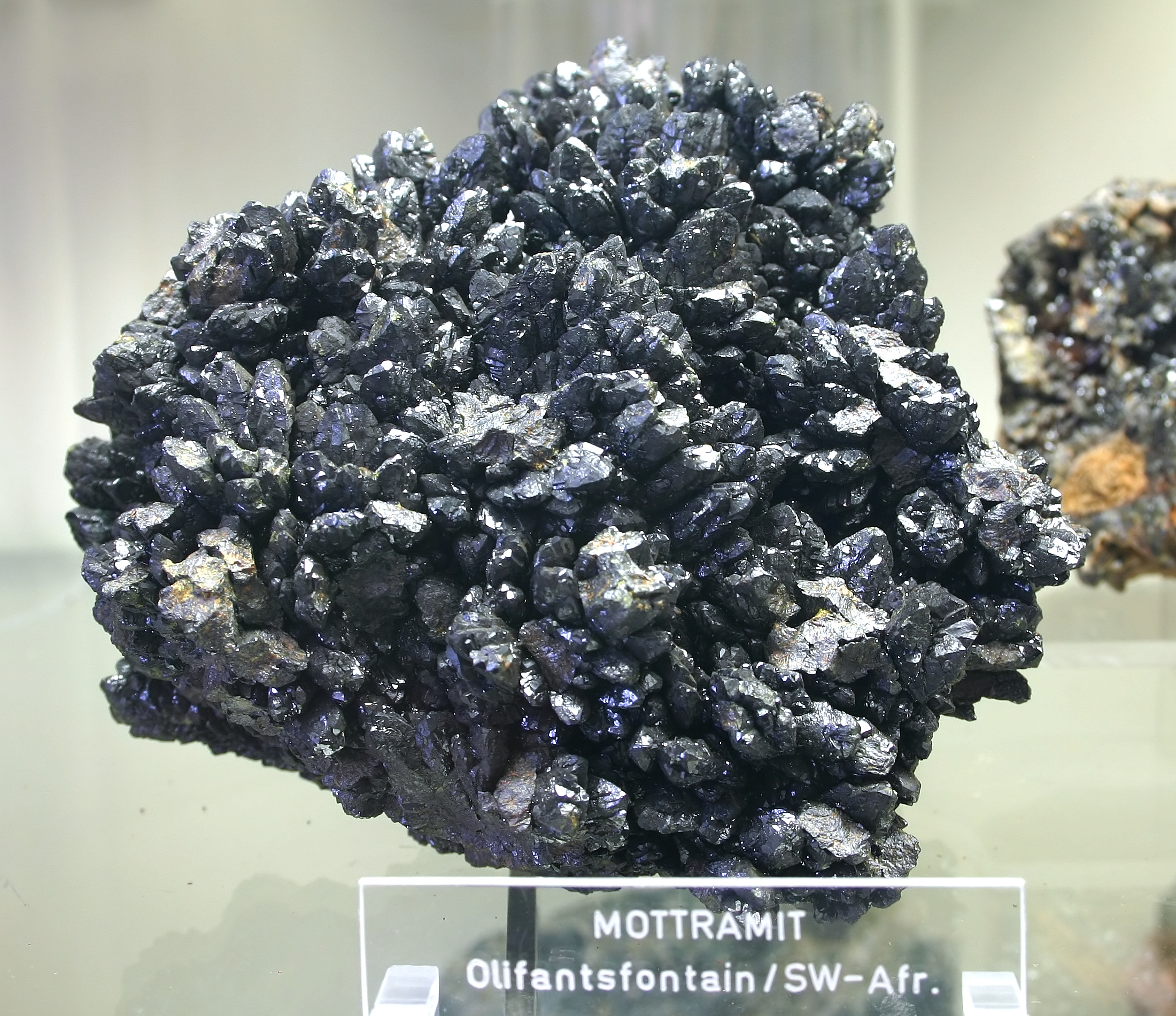
Mottramite, Olifantsfontein, Grootfontein, Namibia

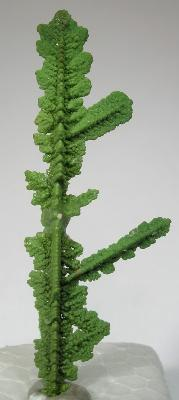
Pseudomorph of mottramite after dendritic copper, Tsumeb mine, Namibia

== Physical properties ==
No cleavage has been observed. The mineral is brittle and breaks with a subconchoidal to uneven fracture. It is quite soft, with Mohs hardness 3 to 3 1/2, just a little harder than calcite. The hardness is slightly greater on crystal surfaces. It is a heavy mineral, with specific gravity 5.9, because of the lead content. It is readily soluble in acids.

== Optical properties ==
Orthorhombic crystals (and triclinic and monoclinic crystals) have two directions in which light travels with zero birefringence; these directions are called the optic axes, and the crystal is said to be biaxial. The speed of a ray of light travelling through the crystal differs with direction. The direction of the fastest ray is called the X direction and the direction of the slowest ray is called the Z direction. X and Z are perpendicular to each other, and a third direction Y is defined as perpendicular to both X and Z; light travelling along Y has an intermediate speed. Refractive index is inversely proportional to speed, so the refractive indices for the X, Y and Z directions increase from X to Z.
For mottramite the orientation with respect to the crystal axes a, b and c is X = c, Y = b and Z = a. The refractive indices are n_{α} = 2.170(2), n_{β} = 2.260(2) and n_{γ} = 2.320(2). The maximum birefringence δ is the difference between the highest and lowest refractive index; for mottramite δ = 0.150. The angle between the two optic axes is called the optic angle, 2V, and it is always acute, and bisected either by X or by Z. If Z is the bisector then the crystal is said to be positive, and if X is the bisector it is said to be negative. Mottramite is usually biaxial (−), and rarely biaxial (+). The measured value of 2V is 73°. Also 2V can be calculated from the values of the refractive indices, giving a value of 46°, which differs considerably from the measured value. 2V depends on the refractive indices, but refractive index varies with wavelength, and hence with colour. Therefore, 2V also depends on the colour, and is different for red and for violet light. This effect is called dispersion of the optic axes, or just dispersion (not to be confused with chromatic dispersion). If 2V is greater for red light than for violet light the dispersion is designated r > v, and vice versa. For mottramite dispersion is strong, usually with r > v, and rarely with r < v. The mineral is pleochroic; when viewed along the X or Y direction it appears canary yellow to greenish yellow and when viewed along the Z direction it appears brownish yellow.

== Occurrence ==
The type locality is Mottram St Andrew, Cheshire, England, UK and type material is conserved at the Natural History Museum, London 52314-52315. Mottramite is a secondary, supergene mineral found principally in the oxidized zones of vanadium bearing base metal deposits, especially sandstones. Associated minerals are descloizite, duftite, mimetite, wulfenite, cerussite, azurite and dioptase.

== Localities ==
- Australia, Kintore open cut: Mottramite is the only secondary mineral with essential vanadium recorded from the Kintore open cut, Broken Hill, Yancowinna County, New South Wales. It has been found scattered on greenish to yellowish drusy plumbogummite – hinsdalite as tiny black glossy pyramids or aggregates of dull black, flattened bipyramids up to 0.4 mm across.
- Australia, Braeside Station: Braeside station is in the Gregory Ranges District, Shire of East Pilbara, Western Australia. Both mottramite and descloizite are common in the central part of the Braeside field. They occur with vanadinite, pyromorphite and cerussite. Descloizite-mottramite was the last to crystallise showing a variety of colours and habits. These include yellow-orange drusy or botryoidal opaque crusts on chalcedony, brown, olive or yellow flaky wedge-shaped transparent crystals up to 100 micrometres wide that form rosettes in association with coronadite and hemimorphite, and short prismatic and bipyramidal green crystals that form a 10 to 15 micrometre thick crust on quartz.
- Australia, Shangri La: At Shangri La, Kununurra, Wyndham-East Kimberley Shire, Western Australia, green to brown mottramite forms thin botryoidal crusts of fine-grained, platy crystals on quartz and iron oxides, and may be associated with vanadinite. Some crusts have a radiating internal texture and show a variation in composition from mottramite at their core, to descloizite at their rim. Mottramite generally grew at the same time as vanadinite.
- Morocco, Bou Azer: Mottramite is the only vanadium mineral known from the Bou Azer district, Tazenakht, Ouarzazate Province, Souss-Massa-Draâ Region, Morocco. It has been found as tiny dark brown resinous crystals on a single piece of heavily altered galena. The specimen shows secondary mineralisation containing mimetite and possibly wulfenite.
- Russia, Berezovskoe Gold Deposit: Mottramite has been found at the Berezovskoe gold deposit, Berezovskii, Ekaterinburg, Sverdlovskaya Oblast', in the Middle Urals. It was found in a quartz vein, in a cavity containing galena, tetrahedrite and tennantite, with associated bushmakinite, cerussite, bindheimite, vauquelinite and pyromorphite.
- United Kingdom, Caldbeck Fells: Mottramite occurs at several localities in the Caldbeck Fells, Allerdale, Cumbria, England.
- Caldbeck Fells, Arm O'Grain: A variety of supergene minerals occur as microscopic crystals at Arm O'Grain, Caldbeck Fells. These include mimetite, pyromorphite, vanadinite, duftite, plumbogummite and beudantite, as well as mottramite. Mottramite is the commonest of them. It occurs as black elongated boat shaped crystals up to about one mm long, scattered over white vein quartz. Occasionally, crusts of mottramite occur in cavities in the quartz that appear to have been formed by the dissolution of baryte. Mottramite was almost certainly produced by oxidation of galena.
- Caldbeck Fells, Brandy Gill: Mottramite has been reported from Brandy Gill, Carrock Fell, Caldbeck Fells as minute yellowish green globular aggregates associated with bayldonite, malachite and mimetite, and as olive-green pyramidal crystals associated with bayldonite, beaverite and beudantite. The primary sulfide minerals at Brandy Gill are galena, chalcopyrite and arsenopyrite.
- Caldbeck Fells, Short Grain: Mottramite is quite common at Short Grain, Deer Hills, Caldbeck Fells. It usually occurs as thin druses of yellow or dark greenish brown crusts associated with pyromorphite or baryte. Less commonly it occurs as bipyramids on quartz. The crystals are inconspicuous and rarely exceed 0.1 mm. It is sometimes associated with chrysocolla. Most mottramite contains some arsenic substituting for vanadium, so there is a gradation toward vanadium-rich duftite.
- Caldbeck Fells, Ingray Gill: Minute drusy yellow to yellow-brown mottramite crusts made up of characteristic boat-shaped crystals a few tens of micrometres across cover specimens from the mine dump at Ingray Gill, Caldbeck Fells. Mottramite encrusts mimetite and white to pale green pyromorphite epimorphs after galena. It is one of the most common supergene minerals at Ingray Gill, but because of its colour and habit it is easily mistaken for pyromorphite or mimetite.
- Caldbeck Fells, Low Pike: Several supergene minerals including bayldonite, beudantite, brochantite, cornwallite, duftite, malachite, mimetite, philipsburgite and pseudomalachite as well as mottramite occur in thin fractures in quartz at Low Pike, Caldbeck Fells.
- Caldbeck Fells, Balliway Rigg: Mottramite is rare at Balliway Rigg. It has been found as minute olive green pyramidal crystals on hemimorphite and chrysocolla and as scattered yellow to yellow-brown blocky crystals on lavender-blue plumbogummite. It also occurs as minute brown pyramidal crystals on green pyromorphite. The largest crystals are a few tenths of a millimetre across.
- Caldbeck Fells, Brae Fell Mine: Mottramite is quite common on the mine dump at Brae Fell Mine, Roughton Gill, Caldbeck Fells, as coatings of minute rice-grain shaped crystals less than 0.1 mm long on quartz. The crystals are dark brown to buff in colour, often associated with pyromorphite, and occasionally associated with cerussite.
- Caldbeck Fells, Sandbed Mine: A yellow-brown crust on samples from the dumps of the Sandbed mine has been identified as mottramite.
- US, Brown Monster Mine and Reward Mine: Mottramite is relatively common at the Brown Monster Mine and Reward Mine, Russ District, Inyo County, California. It forms pale yellow-green to tan, brick-red and chocolate brown botryoidal crusts, commonly associated with mimetite and wulfenite, or with dark reddish-brown vanadinite.
- US, Otto Mountain: At Otto Mountain, Baker, San Bernardino County, California, mottramite is generally seen as crusts of botryoidal green to olive-green spheres in association with white vanadinite needles.
