= Arsendescloizite =

Lead-zinc mineral

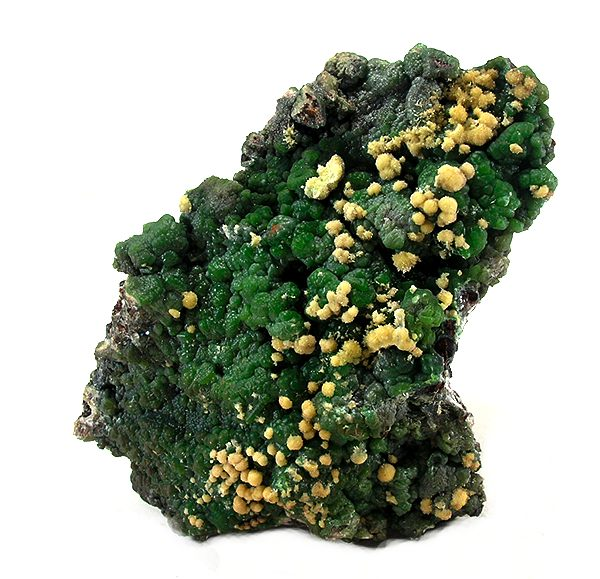
- Arsendescloizite (green) with mimetite (yellow), from Durango, Mexico

General
- Category: Arsenate mineral
- Formula: PbZn(AsO_{4})(OH)
- IMA symbol: Adcz
- Strunz classification: 8.BH.35
- Dana classification: 41.5.1.9
- Crystal system: Orthorhombic
- Crystal class: Disphenoidal; H-M symbol: 2 2 2
- Space group: P2_{1} 2_{1} 2_{1}
- Unit cell: 433.99

Identification
- Color: Pale yellow to deep green, greyish brown
- Mohs scale hardness: 4
- Luster: Sub-vitreous
- Streak: White
- Diaphaneity: Transparent
- Specific gravity: 6.57
- Density: 6.57
- Optical properties: Biaxial (−)
- Refractive index: n_{α} = 1.990 n_{β} = 2.030 n_{γ} = 2.035
- Birefringence: 0.045
- Pleochroism: None
- 2V angle: Measured: 30° Calculated: 38°
- Dispersion: r > v
- Extinction: XYZ = bac
- Ultraviolet fluorescence: None

Arsendescloizite is a lead-zinc mineral, approved by the IMA in 1982. It is an arsenate analog of descloizite. Its first description was published in 1982.

== Properties ==
Arsendescloizite belongs to the adelite-descloizite group. It is the arsenate analog of the lead-zinc vanadate mineral descloizite. It grows crystals that are platy to wedge-shaped. Its composition consists of lead (48.35%), oxygen (18.67%), arsenic (17.48%), zinc (18.99%), and contains a negligible amount of hydrogen (0.24%). Crystals are tabular on {001}. These tabular crystals tend to intergrow into rose-like shaped aggregates. Observed forms are {001}, {011}, {101} and {111}. Unlike descloizite, arsendescloizite has no trace of vanadium in its composition whatsoever, thus it became quickly obvious that the mineral was from a new species. From the composition alone, this mineral could have also been the lead analog of austinite or the zinc analog of duftite. The specimen Pete and Paul were studying was found on a matrix of a copper ore that mainly consisted of tennantite. When studying the specimen, they found no trace of calcium or copper in its formula. This was weird due to the fact that it occurs with the calcium-rich mimetite and was found on a copper ore.

== Occurrence ==
Arsendescloizite's type locality is at the Tsumeb mine, Namibia. It has been reported subsequently from Cumbria, England. Arsendescloizite is also found in Durango, Mexico. Arsendescloizite occurs in oxidized hydrothermal polymetallic deposits as a secondary mineral. It is associated with chalcocite, quartz, mimetite, goethite and willemite. It comes in a sequence of these minerals, arsendescloizite being between mimetite and goethite.

== See also ==
- List of minerals
