= Plumbogummite =

Alunite supergroup, phosphate mineral

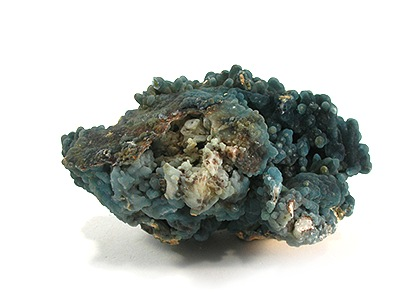

General
- Category: Phosphate minerals
- Formula: PbAl_{3}(PO_{4})_{2}(OH)_{5}·H_{2}O
- IMA symbol: Pbg
- Strunz classification: 8.BL.10
- Dana classification: 42.7.3.5
- Crystal system: Trigonal
- Crystal class: Hexagonal scalenohedral (3̅m); H-M symbol: (3̅ 2/m)
- Space group: R3̅m

Identification
- Formula mass: 581.14 g/mol
- Color: Blue, grey, greenish or yellow
- Crystal habit: Crystals, rare, have a hexagonal outline
- Cleavage: None
- Fracture: Uneven or sub-conchoidal
- Tenacity: Brittle
- Mohs scale hardness: 4 to 5 or 4.5 to 5
- Luster: Resinous or dull
- Streak: White
- Diaphaneity: Translucent
- Specific gravity: 4.014
- Optical properties: Uniaxial (+), segments of crystals may be biaxial
- Refractive index: n_{o} = 1.653 or 1.653 to 1.688 n_{e} = 1.675 or 1.675 to 1.704 n_{o} = 1.722 and n_{e} = 1.742 for Ga-rich plumbogummite
- Pleochroism: None
- Solubility: Soluble in hot acids
- Other characteristics: Non-fluorescent, not radioactive

Plumbogummite is a rare secondary lead phosphate mineral, belonging to the alunite supergroup of minerals, crandallite subgroup. Some other members of this subgroup are:

- Crandallite, CaAl_{3}(PO_{4})_{2}(OH)_{5}·H_{2}O, where calcium replaces lead
- Goyazite, SrAl_{3}(PO_{4})_{2}(OH)_{5}·H_{2}O, where strontium replaces lead
- Philipsbornite, PbAl_{3}(AsO_{4})_{2}(OH)_{5}·H_{2}O, where the arsenate group AsO_{4} replaces the phosphate group PO_{4}

Plumbogummite was discovered in 1819 and named in 1832 from the Latin "plumbum" for lead, and "gummi" for gum, in allusion to its lead content and appearance, which at times resembles coatings of gum.

== Unit cell ==
Plumbogummite crystallizes in space group R3̅m. The reported lattice parameters (the lengths of the sides of the unit cell) vary in detail according to the source, but all agree that normal plumbogummite has "a" close to 7 Å and "c" close to 17 Å, with Z = 3. Various reported values of "a" and "c" are:

a = 7.01 Å, 7.017 Å, 7.018 Å, 7.033 Å
c = 16.71Å, 16.75 Å, 16.784 Å, 16.789 Å

Mills et al. investigated a gallium-rich sample of plumbogummite from Tsumeb, Namibia, and found larger cell parameters, with a = 7.0752 Å and c = 16.818 Å.

== Structure ==
The basic structural units of plumbogummite are PO_{4} tetrahedra, with phosphorus atoms (P) at the center and oxygen atoms (O) at the corners, together with AlO_{6} octahedra, aluminium atoms (Al) at the center and oxygen atoms at the corners. The tetrahedra and octahedra combine by sharing corners, to form composite layers. Lead atoms (Pb) occupy sites between the layers.

== Environment ==
Plumbogummite is found in the oxidized zones of lead-bearing deposits. It commonly occurs as botryoidal, kidney shaped, stalactitic or globular crusts or masses, frequently with a concentric structure; rare crystals have a hexagonal outline. Pyromorphite and baryte are commonly associated minerals, and plumbogummite may be pseudomorphic after them. Other associated minerals include mimetite, duftite, cerussite, anglesite and wulfenite.

== Occurrence ==
The type locality is Huelgoat, Finistère, Brittany, France, and the type material is stored in the Natural History Museum, Paris, France.

Plumbogummite has been found in the Central Cobar Mines, New South Wales, Australia and the Nifty Copper Mine, Western Australia. Also in the Kintore open cut at Broken Hill, New South Wales, Australia, but it is generally inconspicuous there and only a few specimens have been collected.

Material from the Siglio XX Mine, Llallagua, Bolivia, is an unusual pale yellow color, rather than the more common blue or green, forming crusts on quartz and cassiterite, and enclosing crude octahedral jeanbandyite crystals with orange colored shells of plumbogummite.
