= Duftite =

Arsenate mineral

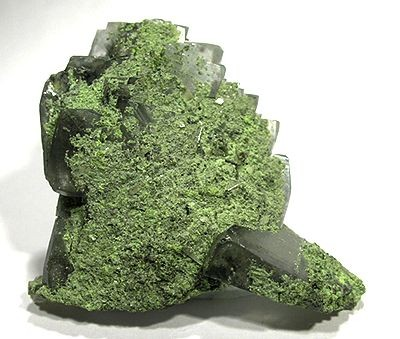
- Duftite from Tsumeb Mine, Tsumeb, Otjikoto Region, Namibia

General
- Category: Arsenate minerals
- Formula: PbCuAsO_{4}(OH)
- IMA symbol: Dft
- Strunz classification: 8.BH.35
- Dana classification: 41.5.1.4
- Crystal system: Orthorhombic
- Crystal class: Disphenoidal (222); H-M symbol: (2 2 2)
- Space group: P2_{1}2_{1}2_{1}
- Unit cell: a = 7.768(1), b = 9.211(1) c = 5.999(1) [Å]; Z = 4

Identification
- Formula mass: 426.67 g/mol
- Color: Green, olive green or grey green. Generally zoned due to compositional variations.
- Crystal habit: Tiny crystals elongated along [001] with curved and rough faces, aggregated into crusts. Crystals may be pseudo-octahedral.
- Cleavage: Indistinct
- Fracture: Uneven to conchoidal
- Mohs scale hardness: 4.5
- Luster: Vitreous on fracture surfaces and dull on crystal faces
- Streak: Pale green or white
- Diaphaneity: Crystals are transparent to translucent
- Specific gravity: 6.4 (measured), 6.60 (calculated)
- Optical properties: Biaxial (-), faint apple-green color (transmitted light)
- Refractive index: n_{α} = 2.03–2.04, n_{β} = 2.06–2.08, n_{γ} = 2.08–2.10
- Birefringence: δ = 0.06
- 2V angle: Large
- Dispersion: r > v, perceptible
- Solubility: Readily soluble in acids
- Other characteristics: Decrepitates on heating. Not radioactive.

Duftite is a relatively common arsenate mineral with the formula CuPb(AsO_{4})(OH), related to conichalcite. It is green and often forms botryoidal aggregates. It is a member of the adelite-descloizite Group, Conichalcite-Duftite Series. Duftite and conichalcite specimens from Tsumeb are commonly zoned in color and composition. Microprobe analyses and X-ray powder-diffraction studies indicate extensive substitution of Zn for Cu, and Ca for Pb in the duftite structure. This indicates a solid solution among conichalcite, CaCu(AsO_{4} )(OH), austinite, CaZn(AsO_{4})(OH) and duftite PbCu(AsO_{4})(OH), all of them belonging to the adelite group of arsenates. It was named after Mining Councilor G Duft, Director of the Otavi Mine and Railroad Company, Tsumeb, Namibia. The type locality is the Tsumeb Mine, Tsumeb, Otjikoto Region, Namibia.

== Structure ==
The structure is composed of chains of edge-sharing CuO_{6} distorted octahedra parallel to the c axis. The chains are linked by AsO_{4} tetrahedra and Pb atoms.

== Environment ==
Duftite is an uncommon product of weathered sulfide ore deposits. It is associated with azurite at the type locality, and with bayldonite, segnitite, agardite and gartrellite at the central Cobar Mines, New South Wales, Australia, where some pseudomorphs of duftite after mimetite have also found. It occurs in association with olivenite, mottramite, azurite, malachite, wulfenite and calcite in the Tsumeb, Namibia deposit. It occurs with bayldonite, beudantite, mimetite and cerussite in the Cap Garonne mine, France.

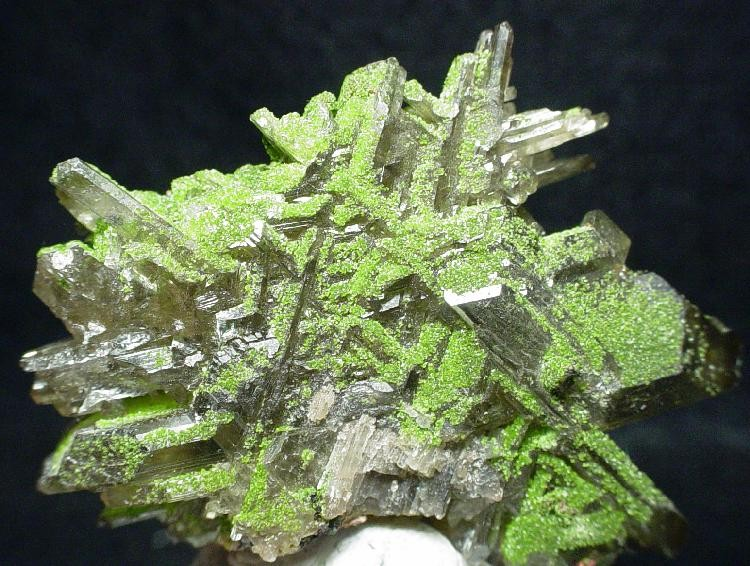
Duftite on cerussite, Tsumeb mine, Namibia (size: 6 × 5 × 3 cm)

== Distribution ==
Reported from Argentina, Australia, Austria, Chile, the Czech Republic, France, Germany, Greece, Italy, Japan, Mexico, Namibia, Poland, Portugal, Russia, South Africa, Spain, Switzerland, the UK, the US and Zimbabwe.

== Bibliography ==
- Palache, P.; Berman H.; Frondel, C. (1960). "Dana's System of Mineralogy, Volume II: Halides, Nitrates, Borates, Carbonates, Sulfates, Phosphates, Arsenates, Tungstates, Molybdates, Etc. (Seventh Edition)" John Wiley and Sons, Inc., New York, pp. 810-811.
