= Gottlobite =

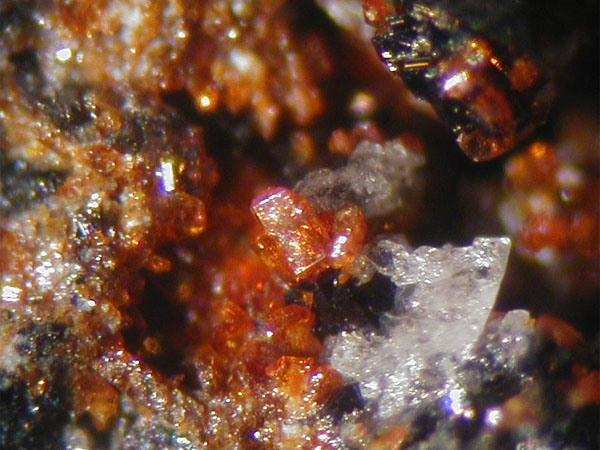

General
- Category: Hydroxide mineral, Vanadate mineral
- Formula: CaMg(VO_{4})(OH)
- IMA symbol: Got
- Strunz classification: 08.BH.35
- Dana classification: 41.05.01.10
- Crystal system: Orthorhombic
- Space group: P222
- Unit cell: a = 7.501(4) Å; b = 9.010(7) Å; c = 5.941(4) Å; Z = 4, V = 401.5Å^{3}

Identification
- Formula mass: 205.20 gm
- Color: Orange to orange-brown
- Crystal habit: Isometric to tabular crystals
- Twinning: Not observed
- Cleavage: Not observed
- Fracture: Conchoidal to irregular
- Tenacity: Brittle
- Mohs scale hardness: 4.5
- Luster: Vitreous to adamantine
- Streak: Light brownish
- Diaphaneity: Transparent
- Specific gravity: 3.46 g/cm^{3} (calculated)
- Optical properties: Biaxial negative
- Refractive index: n_{α} = 1.797 n_{β} = 1.805-1.815 n_{γ} = 1.828
- Pleochroism: Medium strong with X = orange-brown, Y = pale yellowish brown, and Z = orange-brown
- Group: Vandates and arsenates

Gottlobite, CaMg(VO_{4},AsO_{4})(OH), is a mineral in the adelite group found as isolated crystals or isometric grains of orange or orange-brown color. The size of the crystals are a half millimeter in diameter and are part of the orthorhombic crystal system. Gottlobite is the vanadate end member in a solid solution formed with adelite (CaMg(AsO_{4})(OH)). Gottlobite is also part of the vanadates and arsenates group. With these characteristics, it is similar to the minerals tangeite and austinite by X-ray diffraction methods.

== Occurrence ==
Gottlobite is a relatively rare mineral where only a small quantity of the mineral has been found. It was first observed at the site of a long-abandoned mine on the northern slope of Gottlob hill in Friedrichroda, Thuringia, Germany by Jὒrgen Graf in August of 1996. As such, gottlobite got its name from its locality. Additionally, the German translation of "Lob" means "praise" and the German translation of "Gott" means "God", as deciphered by Google Translate. In the mine at this location, Gottlobite is found in hydrothermal veins of barite that are cutting through conglomerate. The crystals of gottlobite can be found embedded in these barite veins or as stand-alone crystals on surrounding minerals. The associated minerals in the area are hausmannite, barite, vanadian adelite, and muscovite.

== Composition ==
Analytical methods used on gottlobite to determine its chemical composition include energy-dispersive X-ray spectrometry (EDX) and wavelength-dispersive X-ray spectrometry (WDX). EDX revealed the presence and quantities of elements present in the mineral, including Ca, V, As, O and small amounts of Sr. This was then measured in terms of oxides, where the weight percents were 24.98 for CaO, 0.92 for SrO, 17.54 for MgO, 1.50 for MnO, 1.44 for CuO, 27.47 for V_{2}O_{5}, 20.32 for As_{2}O_{5}, and 5.4 for H_{2}O. Mg is in gottlobite's chemical formula, but was not found in the EDX testing because of very similar pattern of arsenic lines that were overlapping with magnesium. The full empirical formula of gottlobite is (Ca_{0.93},Sr_{0.03})(Mg_{0.91},Mn_{0.04},Cu_{0.04})(V_{0.63},As_{0.37})O_{4}O_{1.08}H_{1.26}. As seen in the formula, it was also determined that the arsenic and vanadium atoms are in 4-fold (tetrahedral) coordination with oxygen, and the magnesium atoms are in six-fold (octahedral) coordination.

== See also ==
- List of minerals
