= Campylite =

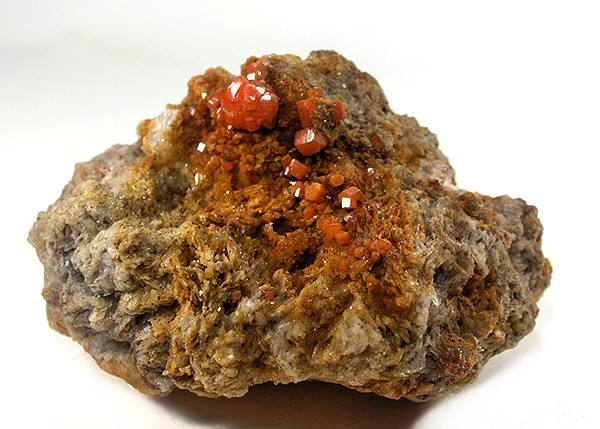
- Mimetite (Var.: Campylite)

General
- Category: Minerals
- Formula: Pb5(AsO4)3Cl

Campylite is a variety of the lead arsenate mineral mimetite which received the name from the Greek 'kampylos'- bent, on account of the barrel-shaped bend of its crystals. It has also been used as an alternate name for pyromorphite.

It occurs in the upper lead deposits through the oxidation of galena or cerussite. The main deposits are Příbram in Bohemia and Dry Gill, Caldbeck Fells, near Wigton, Cumbria, England.
