= Austinite =

Arsenate mineral

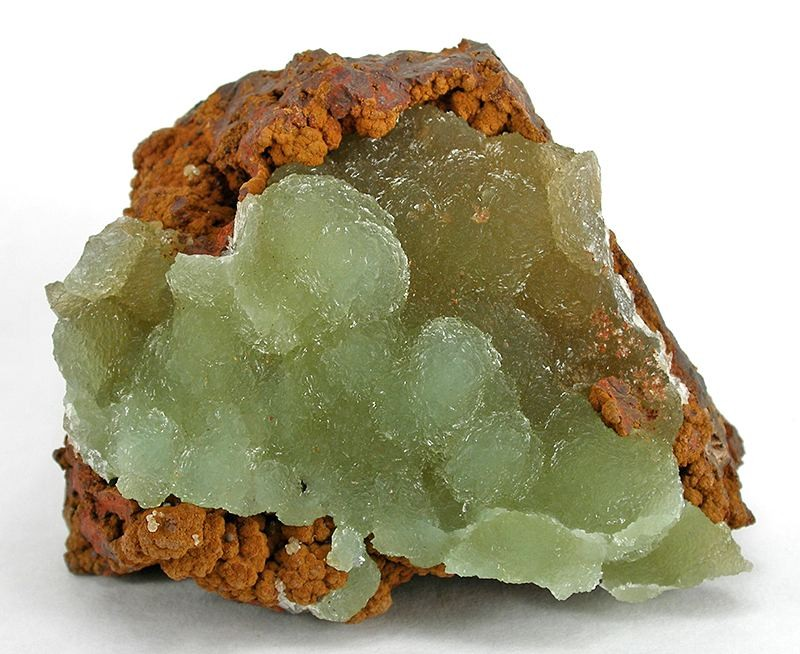
- Austinite from the Ojuela Mine, Mexico

General
- Category: Arsenate minerals
- Formula: CaZnAsO_{4}(OH)
- IMA symbol: Aus
- Strunz classification: 8.BH.35
- Dana classification: 41.5.1.3
- Crystal system: Orthorhombic
- Crystal class: Disphenoidal (222); H-M symbol: (2 2 2)
- Space group: P2_{1}2_{1}2_{1}
- Unit cell: a = 7.43, b = 9.00 c = 5.90 [Å], Z = 4

Identification
- Formula mass: 261.38 g/mol
- Color: Colourless, white to pale yellowish-white or bright green, colourless in transmitted light
- Crystal habit: Well developed orthorhombic crystals of bladed or acicular habit elongated parallel to the c axis, sometimes with sceptre-like terminations, also radially fibrous crusts and nodules. Common forms are {110}, {111}, {1–11}, {010} and {011}.
- Twinning: Left- and right-handed individuals joined on {100}, with {010} and {001} coincident.
- Cleavage: Good in two directions parallel to the prism faces {110}
- Tenacity: Brittle
- Mohs scale hardness: 4 to 4.5
- Luster: Subadamantine to silky in fibrous aggregates
- Streak: White
- Diaphaneity: Translucent to transparent
- Specific gravity: 4.12
- Optical properties: Biaxial (+)
- Refractive index: n_{α} = 1.759, n_{β} = 1.763, n_{γ} = 1.783,
- Birefringence: 0.024
- 2V angle: 47°
- Dispersion: r > v weak
- Solubility: Easily soluble in cold dilute HCl
- Other characteristics: Non-radioactive. Some austinite fluoresces green under SWUV.

Austinite is a member of the adelite-descloizite group, adelite subgroup, the zinc (Zn) end member of the copper-Zn series with conichalcite. It is the zinc analogue of cobaltaustinite and nickelaustinite. At one time “brickerite” was thought to be a different species, but it is now considered to be identical to austinite. Austinite is named in honour of Austin Flint Rogers (1877–1957), American mineralogist from Stanford University, California, US.

== Structure ==
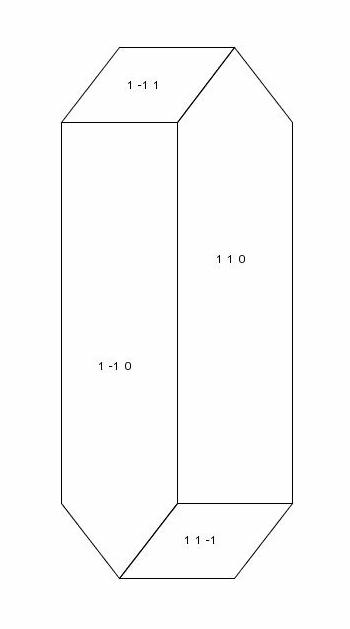
Left-handed austinite

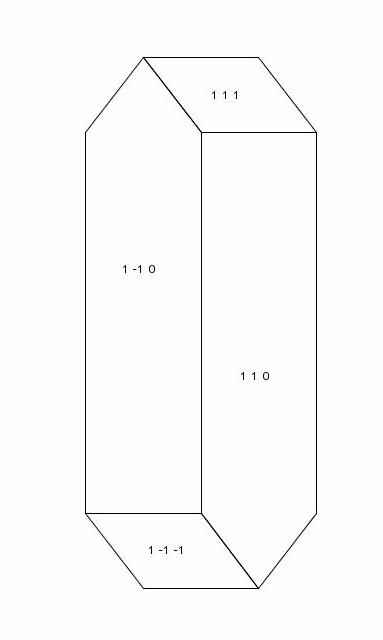
Right-handed austinite

The structure is composed of chains of edge-sharing polyhedra ZnO_{6}, and very distorted Ca(O,OH)_{8} polyhedra linked through AsO_{4} into a three-dimensional network.

Any crystal which has a mirror plane as one of its symmetry elements has the property that its mirror image (with any plane as the mirror plane) can always be superimposed on the original crystal by translation or rotation or both.
If there are no mirror planes as symmetry elements then the mirror image of a crystal cannot be brought into superposition with the original crystal by rotation or translation. This is enantiomorphism, and the mirror images are said to be enantiomorphs of each other. The possibility of enantiomorphic crystals is determined by the crystal symmetry, i.e., by the point group of the crystal species. There are 32 possible point groups, and 22 of these are capable of forming enantiomorphs. The enantiomorphs are designated right or left handed, according to whether they rotate the plane of polarised light to the right or to the left. Sometimes it is clear from the outward form of the crystal whether it is right or left handed, and sometimes optical methods are needed to determine this.

The commonest enantiomorphic mineral is quartz, with point group 32; all quartz crystals will be either right or left handed, but it may not be possible to distinguish this from the external form unless some critical crystal faces are present.

Austinite has point group 222, with no mirror planes, so austinite is also an enantiomorphic mineral, occurring as both right handed and left handed crystals, with right handed ones more common.

== Occurrence ==
Austinite is a rare mineral in the oxidation zone of arsenic bearing base metal deposits, where it is found developed on the colloform (pertaining to the rounded, globular texture of mineral formed by colloidal precipitation) surface of limonite or lining small cavities. It is closely associated with adamite, and appears to be a later mineral. Austinite is associated with adamite, quartz, talmessite and limonite. Its type locality is Gold Hill Mine (Western Utah Mine), Gold Hill, Gold Hill District (Clifton District), Deep Creek Mts, Tooele County, Utah, United States.
