= Vanadinite =

Apatite supergroup, vanadate mineral

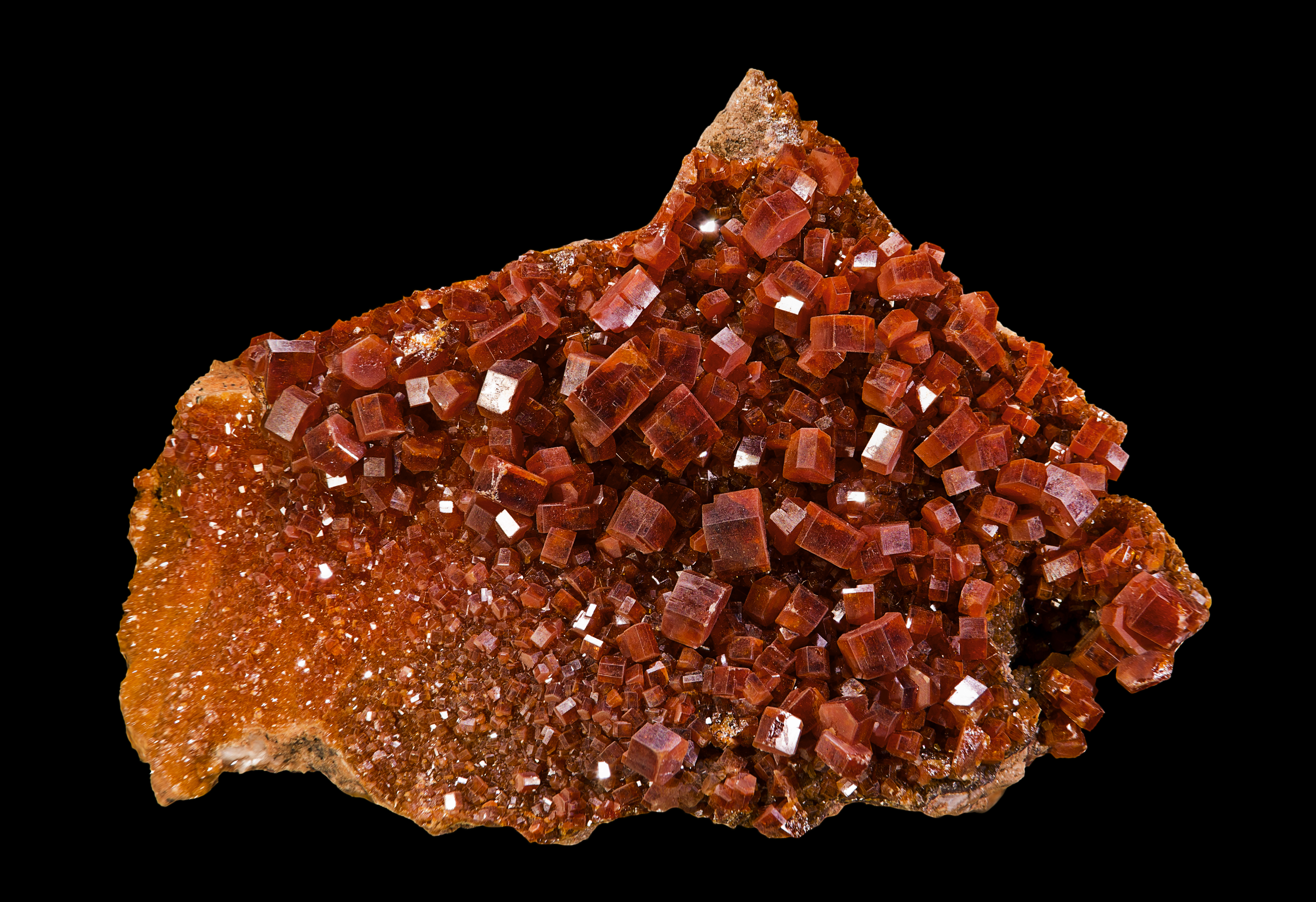

General
- Category: Vanadate minerals Apatite group
- Formula: Pb_{5}(VO_{4})_{3}Cl
- IMA symbol: Vna
- Strunz classification: 8.BN.05
- Crystal system: Hexagonal
- Crystal class: Dipyramidal (6/m); H-M symbol: (6/m)
- Space group: P6_{3}/m
- Unit cell: a = 10.3174, c = 7.3378 [Å]; Z = 2

Identification
- Formula mass: 1416.27 g/mol
- Color: Bright red, orange-red, red-brown, brown, yellow, whitish, grey or colourless or weakly tinted in transmitted light; pale straw-yellow;. may be concentrically zoned
- Crystal habit: Prismatic or nodular; may be acicular, hairlike, fibrous; rarely rounded, globular
- Cleavage: None
- Fracture: Uneven to conchoidal
- Tenacity: Brittle
- Mohs scale hardness: 3–4
- Luster: Resinous to sub-adamantine
- Streak: Brownish yellow
- Diaphaneity: Transparent, translucent or opaque
- Specific gravity: 6.8–7.1 (measured) 6.95 (calculated)
- Optical properties: Uniaxial (−)
- Refractive index: n_{ω} = 2.416, n_{ε} = 2.350
- Birefringence: δ = 0.066
- Ultraviolet fluorescence: Red-orange under near-UV (405nm)
- Melting point: 3,470 °F (1,910 °C)

Vanadinite is a mineral belonging to the apatite group of phosphates, with the chemical formula Pb_{5}(VO_{4})_{3}Cl. It is one of the main industrial ores of the metal vanadium and a minor source of lead. A dense, brittle mineral, it is usually found in the form of red hexagonal crystals. It is an uncommon mineral, formed by the oxidation of lead ore deposits such as galena. First discovered in 1801 in Mexico, vanadinite deposits have since been unearthed in South America, Europe, Africa, and North America.

== Origins ==
Vanadinite is an uncommon mineral, only occurring as the result of chemical alterations to a pre-existing material. It is therefore known as a secondary mineral. It is found in arid climates and forms by oxidation of primary lead minerals. Vanadinite is especially found in association with the lead sulfide, galena. Other associated minerals include wulfenite, limonite, and barite.

It was originally discovered in Mexico by the Spanish mineralogist Andrés Manuel del Río in 1801. He called the mineral "brown lead" and asserted that it contained a new element, which he first named pancromium and later, erythronium. However, he was later led to believe that this was not a new element but merely an impure form of chromium. In 1830, Nils Gabriel Sefström discovered a new element, which he named vanadium. It was later revealed that this was identical to the metal discovered earlier by Andrés Manuel del Río. Del Río's "brown lead" was also rediscovered, in 1838 in Zimapan, Hidalgo, Mexico, and was named vanadinite because of its high vanadium content. Other names that have since been given to vanadinite are johnstonite and lead vanadate.

== Occurrence ==
Vanadinite occurs as a secondary mineral in the oxidized zone of lead-bearing deposits; vanadium is leached from wall-rock silicates. Associated minerals include mimetite, pyromorphite, descloizite, mottramite, wulfenite, cerussite, anglesite, calcite, barite, and various iron oxide minerals.

Deposits of vanadinite are found worldwide, including in Austria, Spain, Scotland, the Ural Mountains, South Africa, Namibia, Morocco, Argentina, Mexico, and four states of the United States: Arizona, Colorado, New Mexico, and South Dakota.

Vanadinite deposits are found in over 400 mines across the world. Notable vanadinite mines include those at Mibladen and Touisset in Morocco; Tsumeb, Namibia; Cordoba, Argentina; and Sierra County, New Mexico, and Gila County, Arizona, in the United States. The Mibladen vanadinites are likely the most popular specimens for mineral collectors.

== Structure ==
Vanadinite is a lead chlorovanadate with the chemical formula Pb_{5}(VO_{4})_{3}Cl. It is composed (by weight) of 73.15% lead, 10.79% vanadium, 13.56% oxygen, and 2.50% chlorine. Each structural unit of vanadinite contains a chlorine ion surrounded by six divalent lead ions at the corners of a regular octahedron, with one of the lead ions provided by an adjoining vanadinite molecule. The distance between each lead and chlorine ion is 317 picometres. The shortest distance between each lead ion is 4.48 Å. The octahedron shares two of its opposite faces with that of neighbouring vanadinite units, forming a continuous chain of octahedrons. Each vanadium atom is surrounded by four oxygen atoms at the corners of an irregular tetrahedron. The distance between each oxygen and vanadium atom is either 1.72 or 1.76 Å. Three oxygen tetrahedrons adjoin each of the lead octahedrons along the chain.

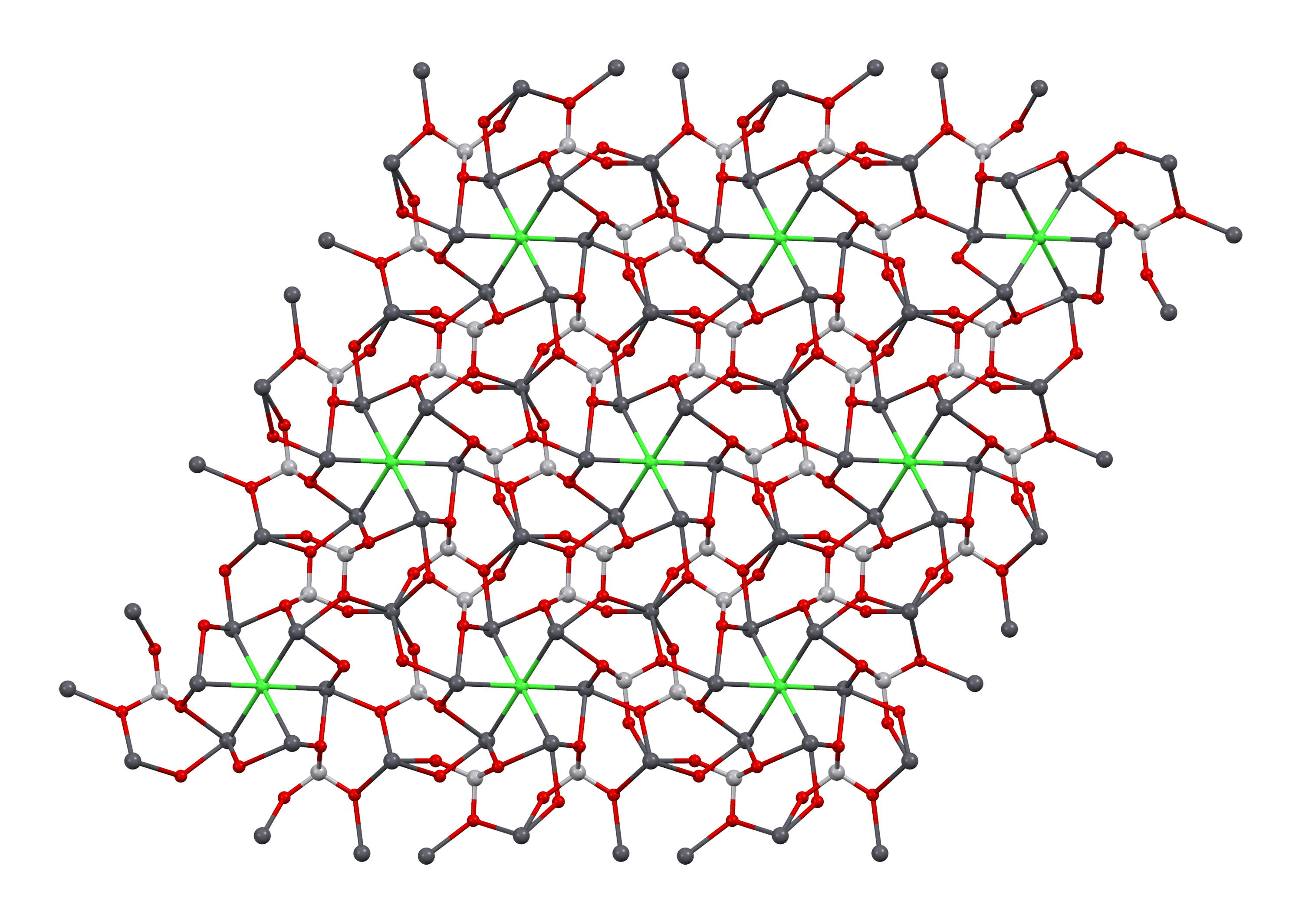
Crystal packing

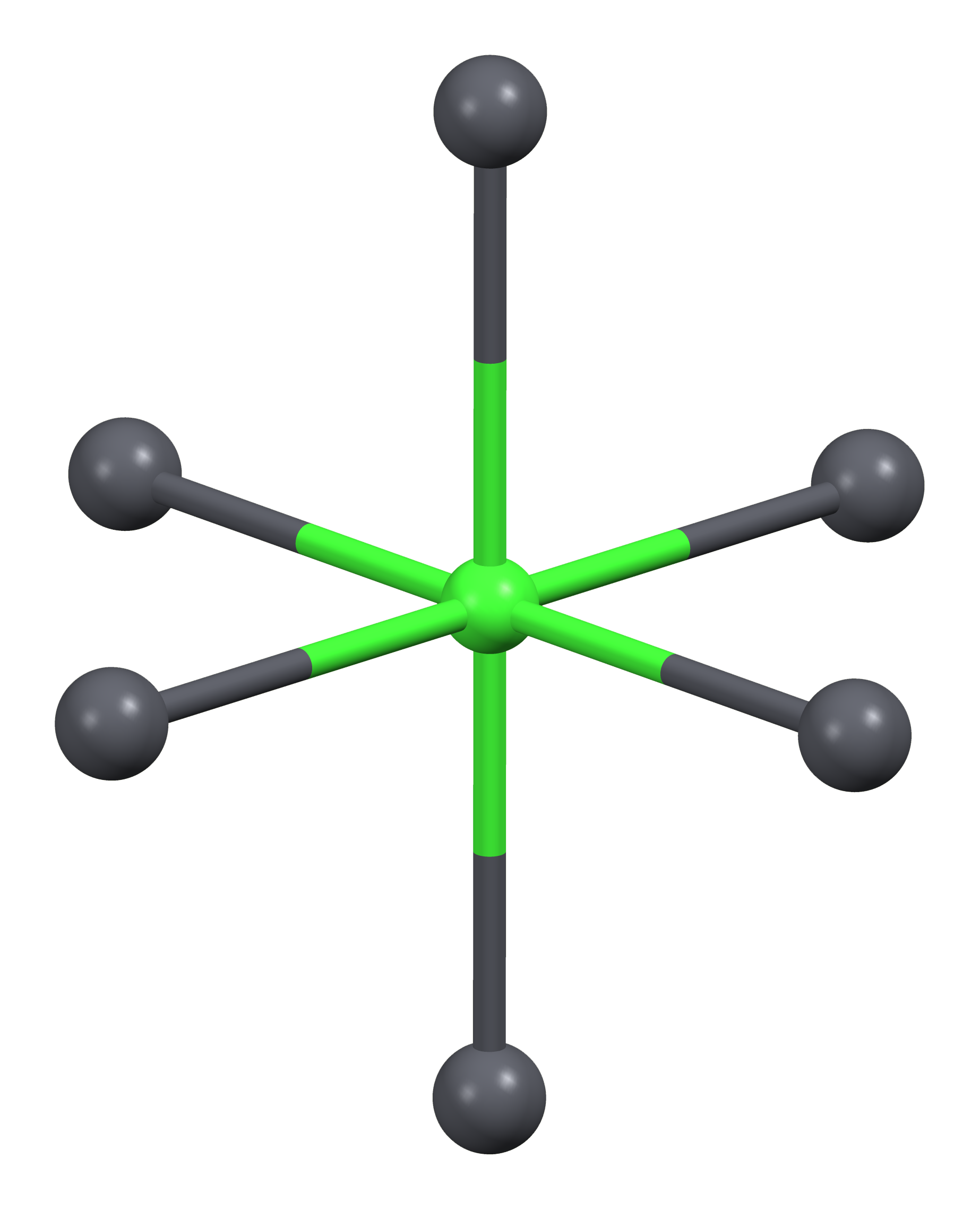
Chloride coordination sphere

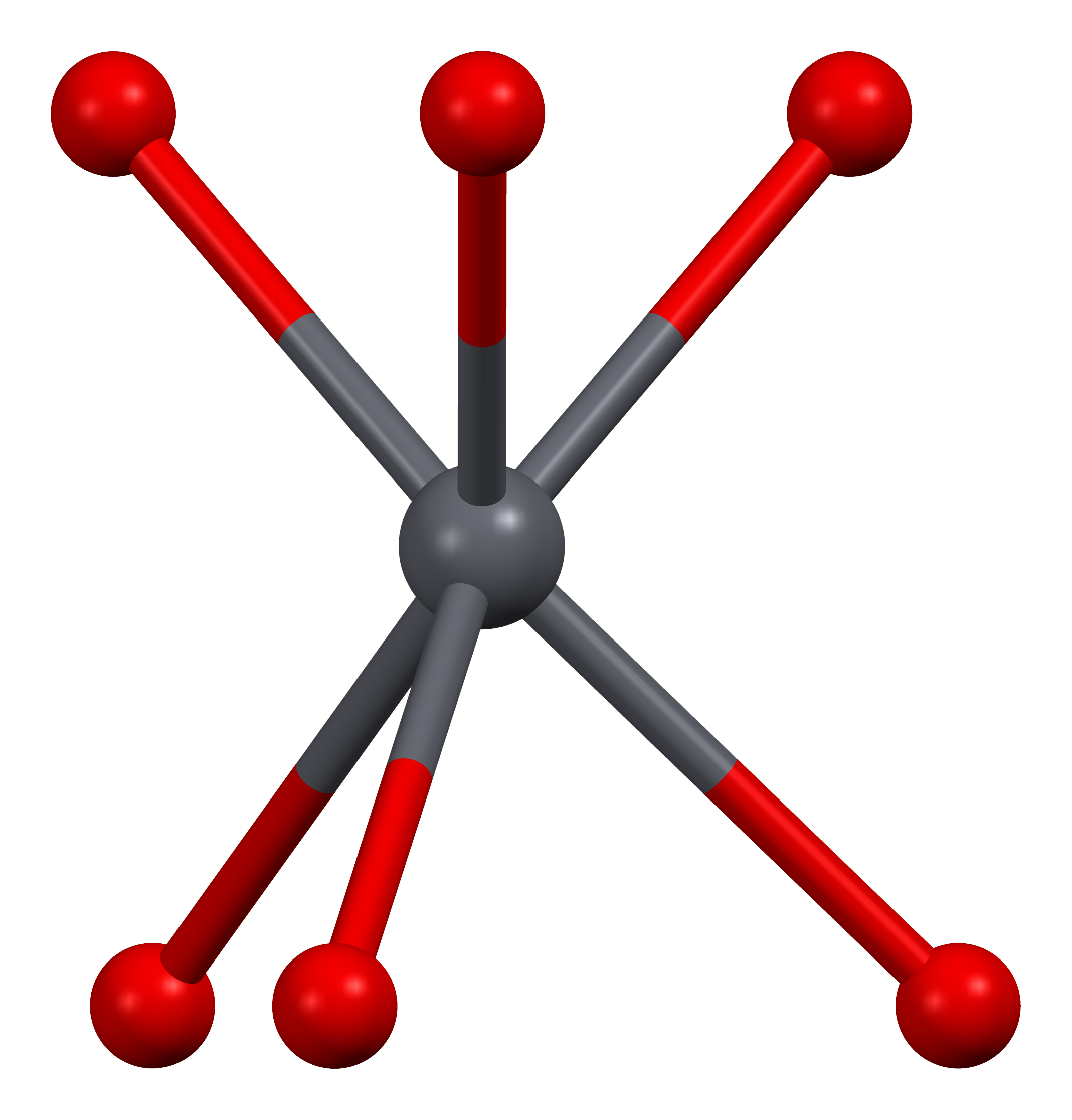
Lead #1 coordination sphere

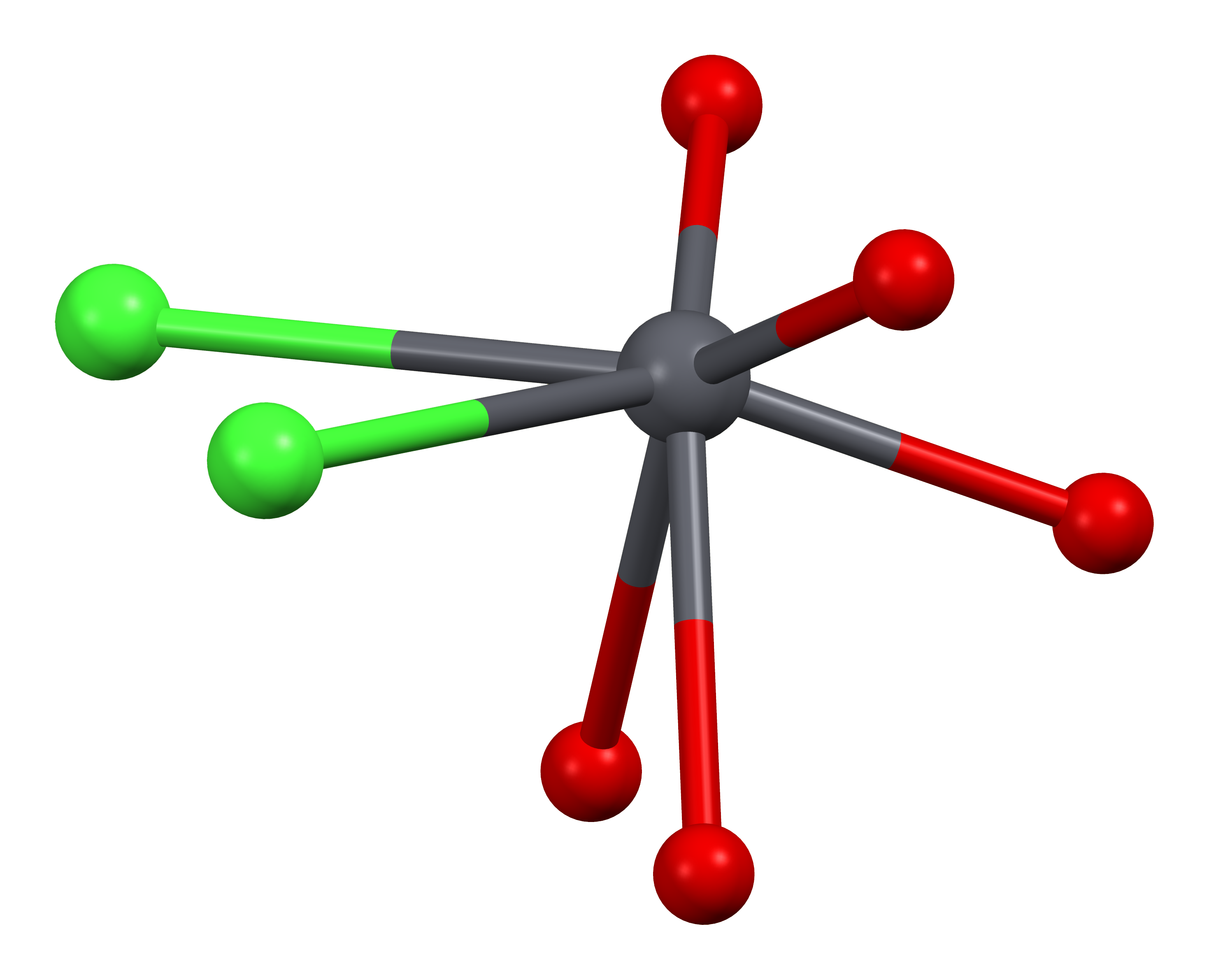
Lead #2 coordination sphere

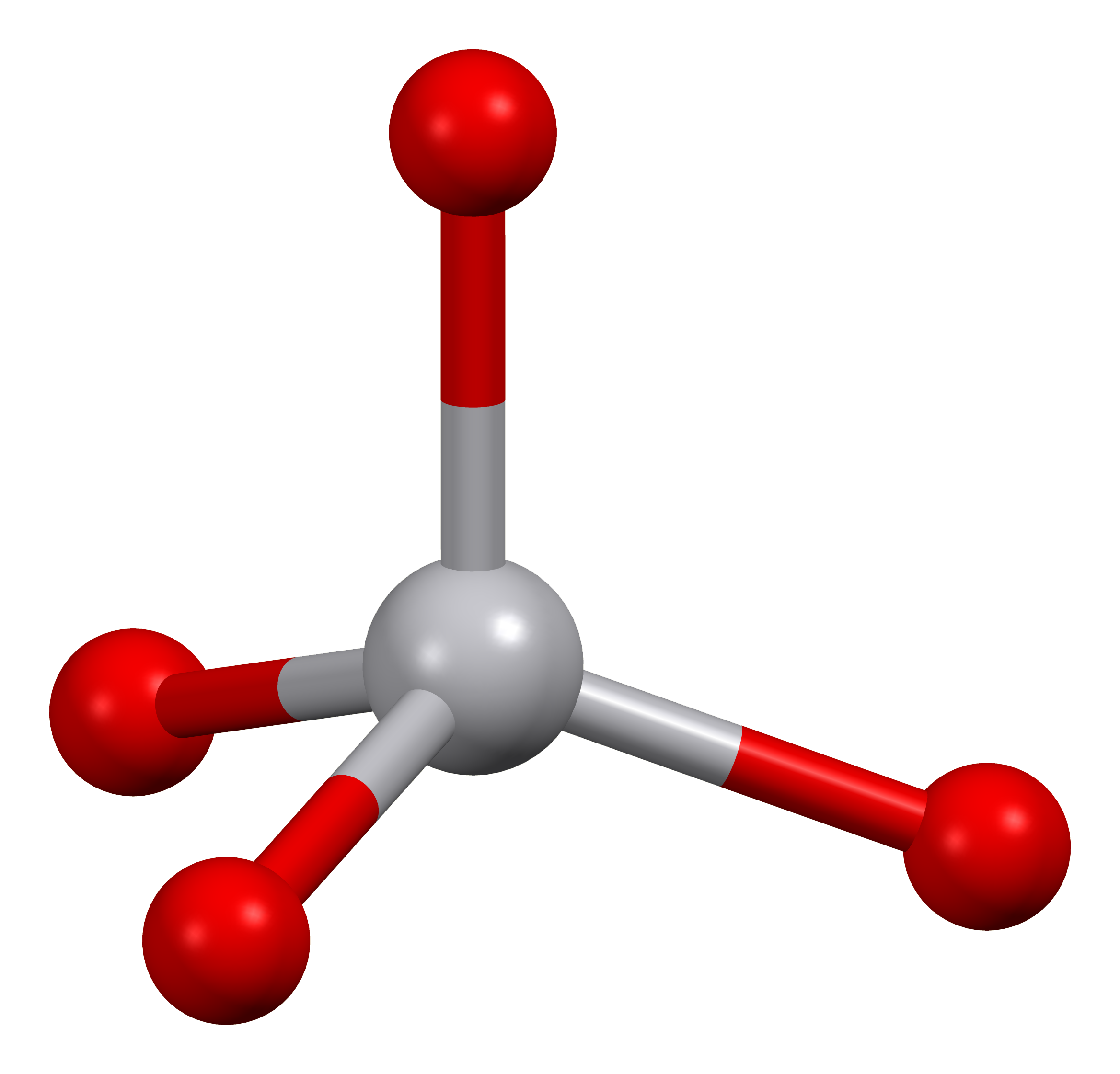
Vanadium coordination sphere

Crystals of vanadinite conform to a hexagonal system of symmetry. This internal structure is often reflected in the hexagonal external shape of the crystals. The crystals are usually in the form of short hexagonal prisms, but can also be found as hexagonal pyramids, rounded masses or crusts. A unit cell of vanadinite, the smallest divisible unit that possesses the same symmetry and properties, is in the form of a hexagonal prism. The unit cell of vanadinite is composed of two of its molecules and has the dimensions a = 10.331 Å and c = 7.343 Å, where a is the length of each side of the hexagon and c is the height of the prism. The volume of each unit cell of vanadinite, given by the formula V = a^{2}c sin(60°), is 678.72 Å^{3}.

== Characteristics ==
Vanadinite is in the apatite group of phosphates, and forms a chemical series with the minerals pyromorphite (Pb_{5}(PO_{4})_{3}Cl) and mimetite (Pb_{5}(AsO_{4})_{3}Cl), with both of which it may form solid solutions. Whereas most chemical series involve the substitution of metallic ions, this series substitutes its anion groups; phosphate (PO_{4}), arsenate (AsO_{4}) and vanadate (VO_{4}). Common impurities of vanadinite include phosphorus, arsenic and calcium, where these may act as an isomorphic substitute for vanadium (in the first two cases) or lead (in the second). Vanadinite when containing a high amount of the arsenic impurity is known as endlichite.

Vanadinite is usually bright-red or orange-red in colour, although sometimes brown, red-brown, grey, yellow, or colourless. Its distinctive colour makes it popular among mineral collectors. Its streak can be either pale yellow or brownish-yellow. Vanadinite may be transparent, translucent or opaque, and its lustre can range from resinous to adamantine. Vanadinite is anisotropic, meaning that some of its properties differ when measured along different axes. When measured perpendicular and parallel to its axis of anisotropy, its refractive indices are 2.350 and 2.416 respectively. This gives it a birefringence of 0.066.

Vanadinite is very brittle, producing small, conchoidal fragments when fractured. Its hardness is 3–4 on the Mohs scale, about the same as a copper coin. Vanadinite is particularly heavy for a translucent mineral. It has a molar mass of 1416.27 g/mol and its specific gravity can range between 6.6 and 7.2 because of impurities.

== Uses ==
Along with carnotite and roscoelite, vanadinite is one of the main industrial ores of the element vanadium, which can be extracted by roasting and smelting. Vanadinite is also occasionally used as a source of lead. A common process for extracting the vanadium begins with the heating of vanadinite with salt (NaCl) or sodium carbonate (Na_{2}CO_{3}) at about 850 °C to produce sodium vanadate (NaVO_{3}). This is dissolved in water and then treated with ammonium chloride to give an orange-coloured precipitate of ammonium metavanadate. This is then melted to form a crude form of vanadium pentoxide (V_{2}O_{5}). Reduction of vanadium pentoxide with calcium gives pure vanadium.

== Image gallery ==
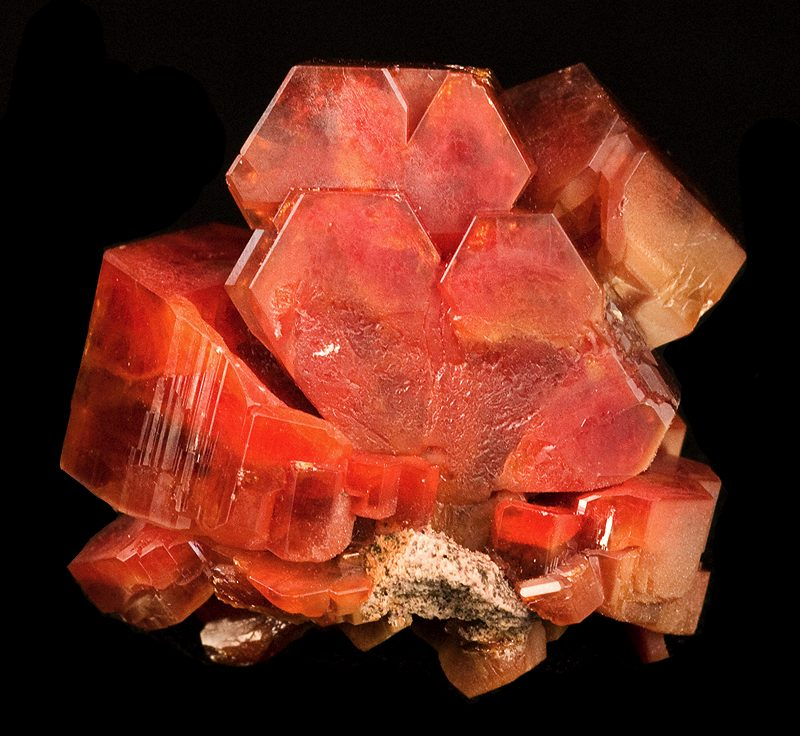
Vanadinite in hexagonal shaped crystals from Mibladen, Morocco

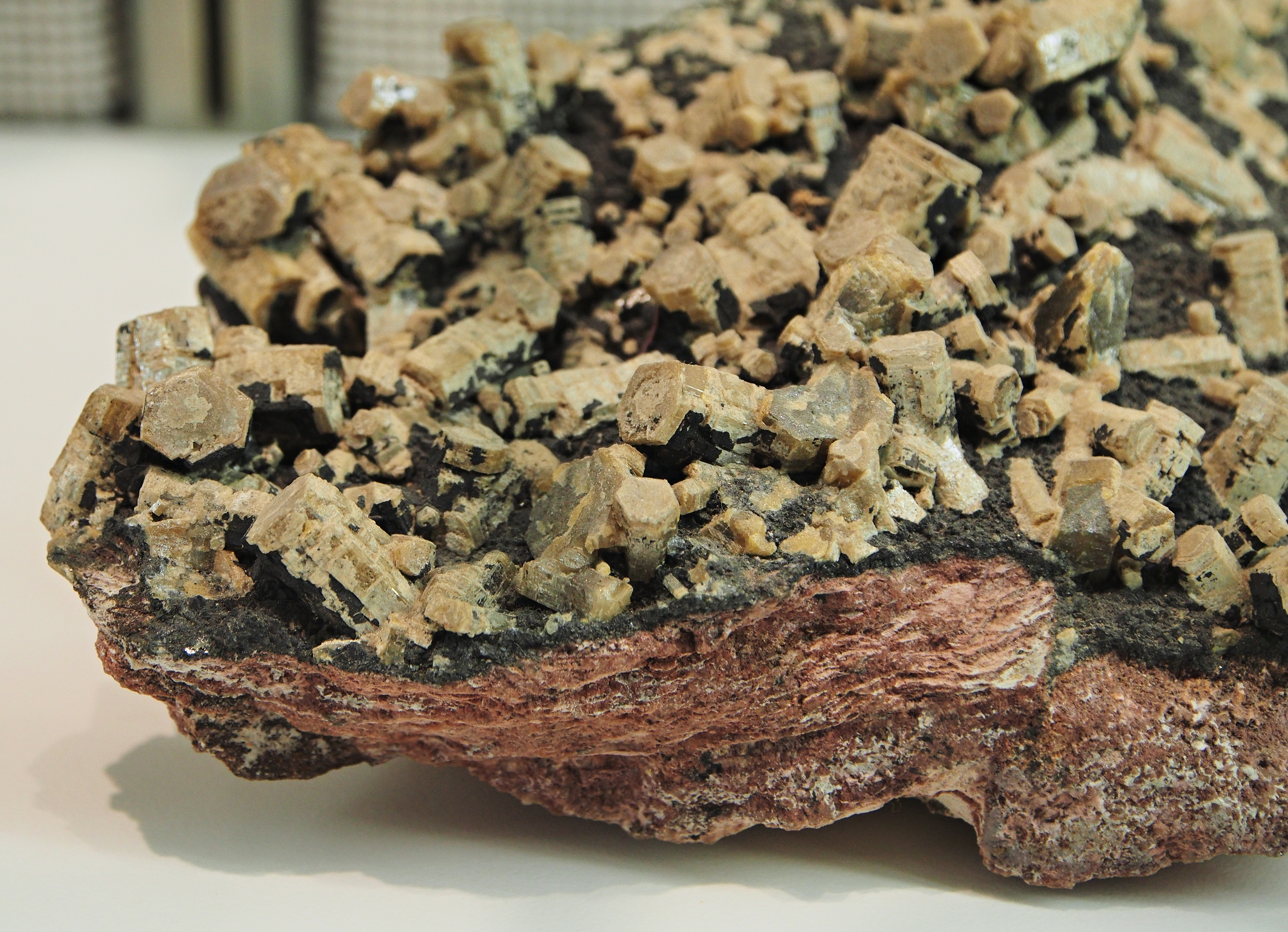
Vanadinite that does not show the characteristic red colour

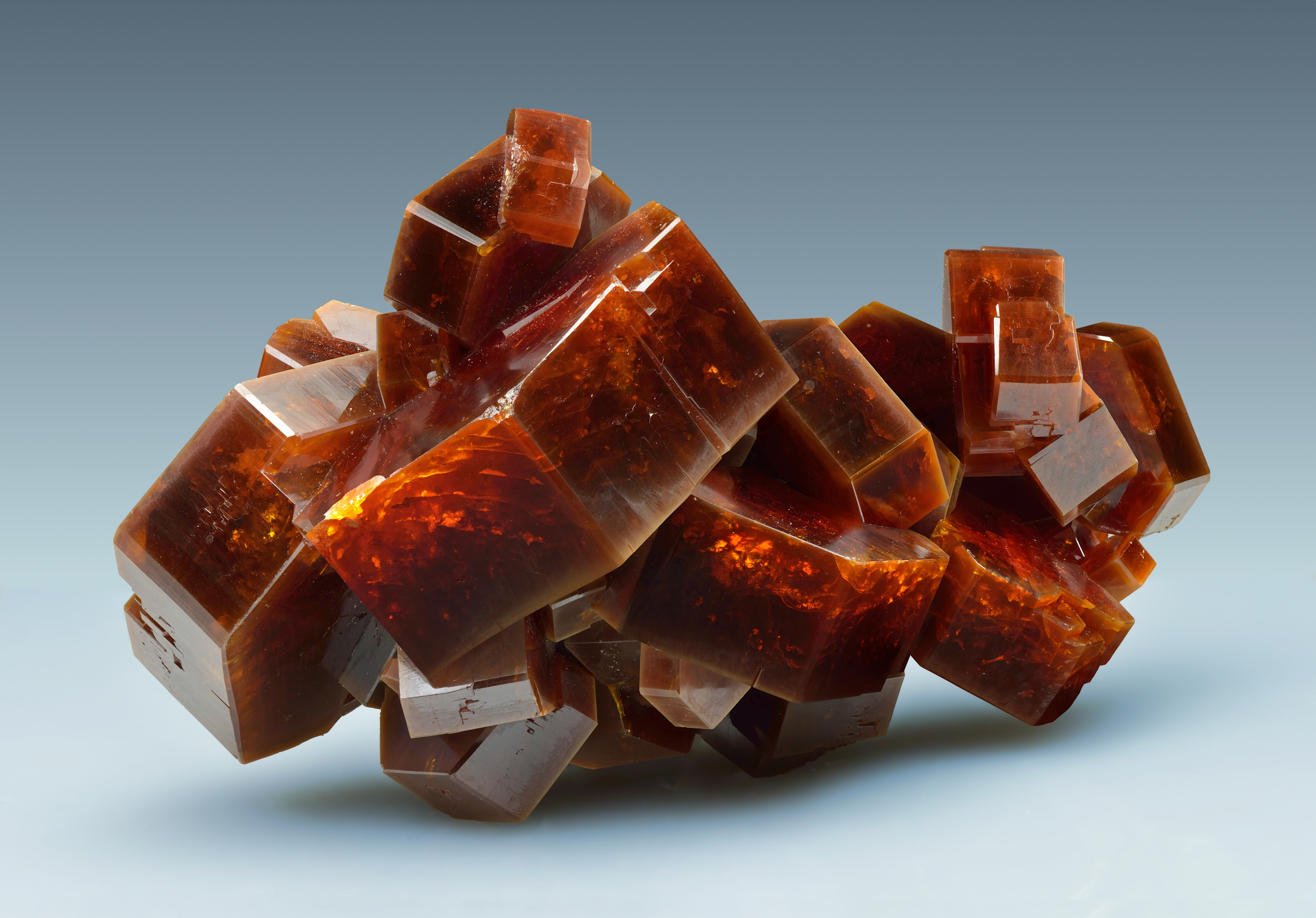
A cluster of vanadinite tabular crystals from Mibladen

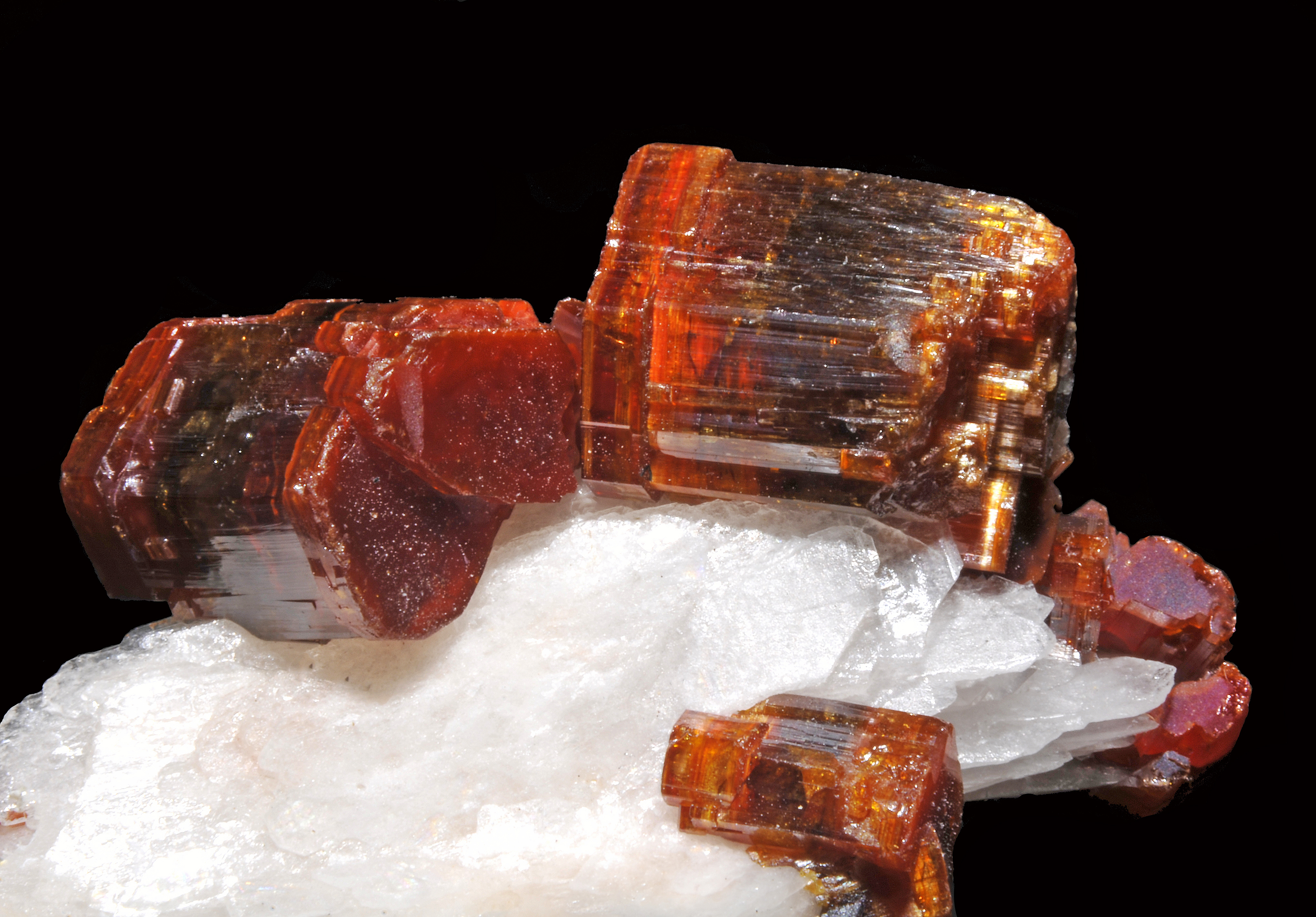
Vanadinite on barite, from Mibladen

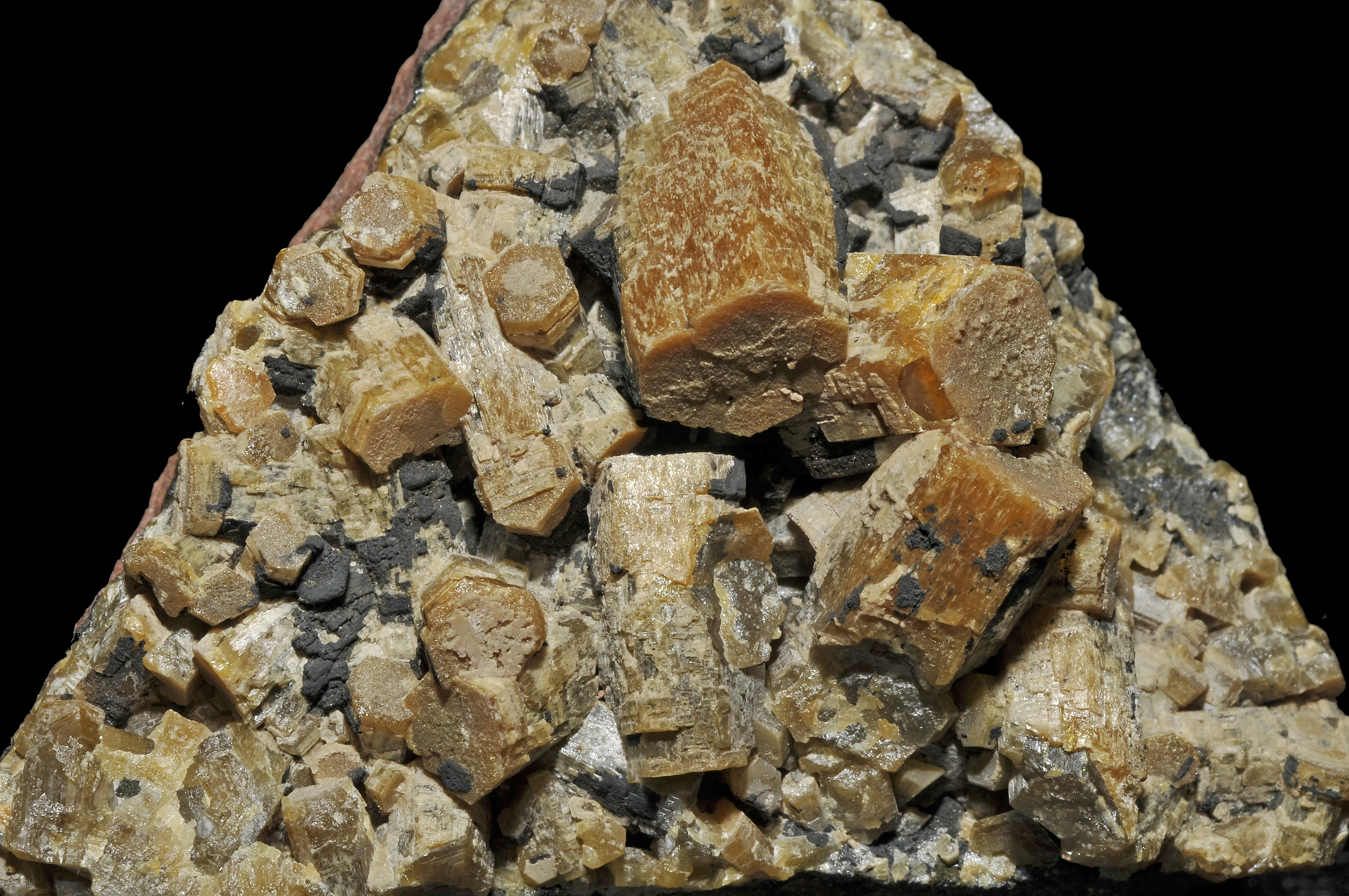
Crystals of vanadinite (var. endlichite), from Touissit, Morocco

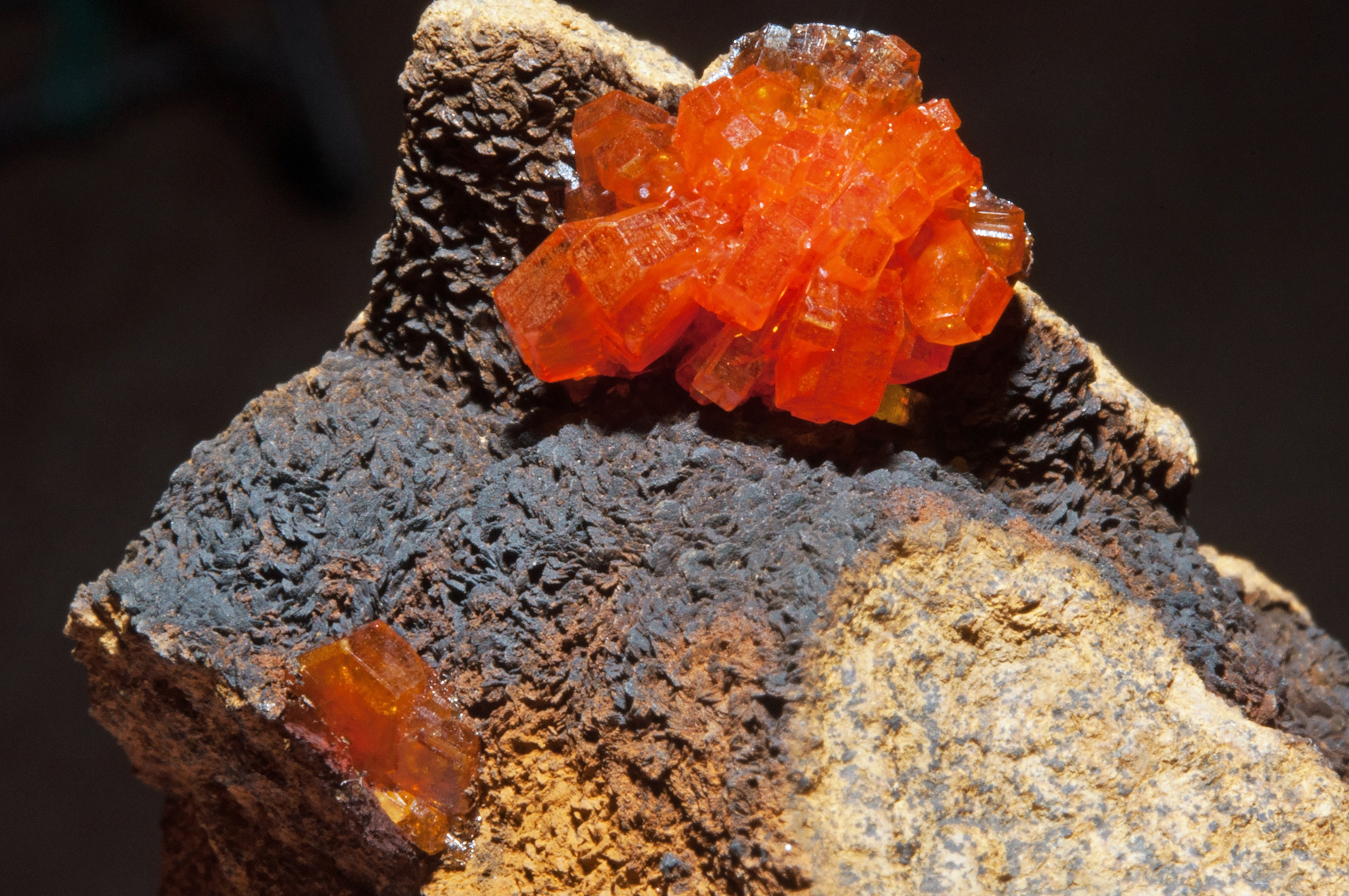
Crystals of vanadinite and siderite from Errachidia Province, Morocco

== See also ==
- List of minerals
