= Conichalcite =

Arsenate mineral

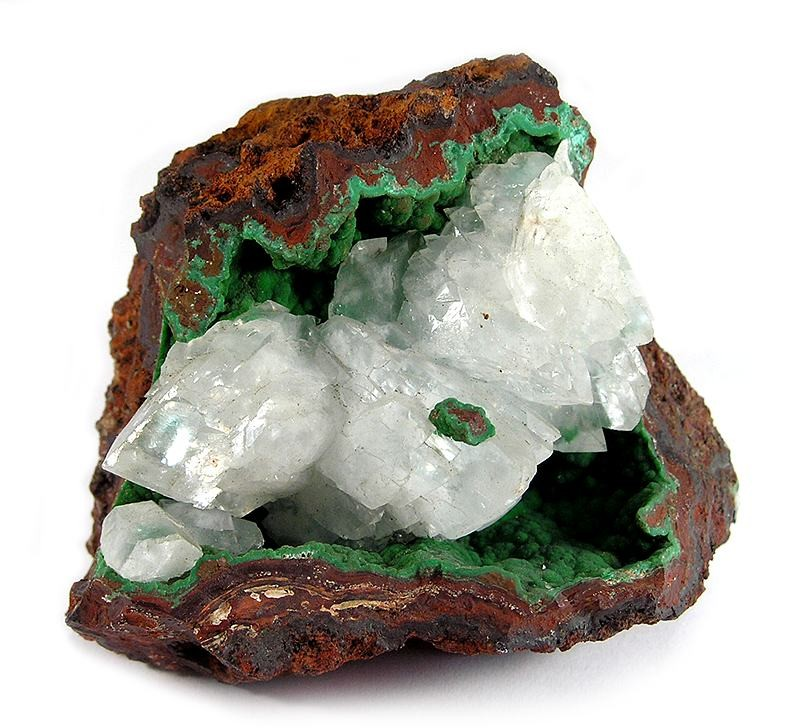
- A thin crust of conichalcite on a rock.

General
- Category: Arsenate minerals
- Formula: CaCu(AsO_{4})(OH)
- IMA symbol: Con
- Strunz classification: 8.BH.35
- Dana classification: 41.5.1.2
- Crystal system: Orthorhombic
- Crystal class: Disphenoidal (222) (same H-M symbol)
- Space group: P2_{1}2_{1}2_{1}
- Unit cell: a = 7.39(1) Å, b = 9.23(1) Å, c = 5.83(1) Å; V = 397.66 Å³; Z = 4

Identification
- Color: Grass-green to yellowish green, pistachio-green, emerald-green; may be zoned; light green to yellowish green in transmitted light.
- Crystal habit: Crusts of acicular to almost fibrous crystals. Also as botryoidal masses and compact crusts.
- Twinning: Rare on {001}
- Cleavage: Absent
- Fracture: Uneven
- Tenacity: Brittle
- Mohs scale hardness: 4.5
- Luster: Vitreous, greasy
- Streak: Green
- Diaphaneity: Translucent
- Specific gravity: 4.3
- Optical properties: Biaxial (+/−)
- Refractive index: n_{α} = 1.778 – 1.800 n_{β} = 1.795 – 1.831 n_{γ} = 1.801 – 1.846
- Birefringence: δ = 0.023 – 0.046
- Pleochroism: Visible
- Dispersion: Strong r < v to r < v moderate

Conichalcite, CaCu(AsO_{4})(OH), is a relatively common arsenate mineral related to duftite (PbCu(AsO_{4})(OH)). It is green, often botryoidal, and occurs in the oxidation zone of some metal deposits. It occurs with limonite, malachite, beudantite, adamite, cuproadamite, olivenite and smithsonite.

== Formation ==
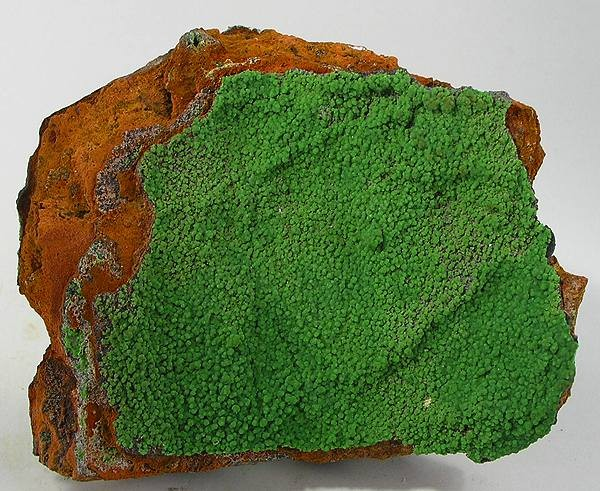
Mat of conichalcite spheres on limonite base from the Ojuela Mine, Mapimí, Durango, Mexico (size: 10.4 x 8.9 x 4.2 cm)

Conichalcite forms in the oxidation zones of copper orebodies. Here groundwater enriched with oxygen reacts with copper sulfide and copper oxide to produce an array of minerals such as malachite, azurite and linarite. Conichalcite is often found encrusted on to limonitic rocks that have yellow to red colors.

Conichalcite will also form a solid solution series with the mineral calciovolborthite. When these two minerals form a solid solution series, the two interchanging elements are arsenic and vanadium. Conichalcite is the arsenic rich end member of the series and calciovolborthite is the vanadium rich end member.

Notable occurrences of conichalcite include Juab Co., Utah; Lincoln and Lyon counties of Nevada and Bisbee, Arizona, in the US; Durango, Mexico; Collahuasi, Tarapaca, Chile; Calstock, Cornwall and Caldbeck Fells, Cumbria, England; Andalusia, Spain; and Tsumeb, Namibia.
