= Tazenakht =

- Village in Morocco
- Tazenakht
- Coordinates: 31°53′01″N 4°19′02″W
- Country: Morocco
- Region: Drâa-Tafilalet
- Province: Errachidia
- Time zone: UTC+0 (GMT)

Tazenakht is a village in Errachidia Province, in the Drâa-Tafilalet region in southeastern Morocco.
