= Descloizite =

Mineral

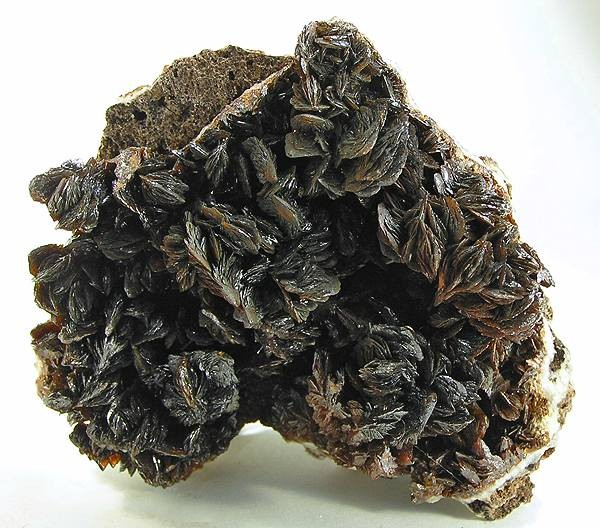
- Descloizite specimen from Berg Aukas (Berg Aukus), Namibia, 9.5 x 8.9 x 4.9 cm

General
- Category: Vanadate mineral
- Formula: (Pb,Zn)_{2}VO_{4}OH
- IMA symbol: Dcz
- Strunz classification: 8.BH.40
- Crystal system: Orthorhombic
- Crystal class: Dipyramidal (mmm); H-M symbol: (2/m 2/m 2/m)
- Space group: Pnma (no. 62)
- Unit cell: a = 7.593, b = 6.057 c = 9.416 [Å]; Z = 4

Identification
- Color: Brownish red, red-orange, reddish to blackish brown, nearly black
- Crystal habit: Zoned tabular crystals common, encrustations and plumose aggregates
- Cleavage: None
- Fracture: Irregular, sub-conchoidal
- Tenacity: Brittle
- Mohs scale hardness: 3 – 3.5
- Luster: Greasy
- Streak: Orange to brownish red
- Diaphaneity: Transparent to opaque
- Specific gravity: 6.1 – 6.2
- Optical properties: Biaxial (−)
- Refractive index: n_{α} = 2.185 n_{β} = 2.265 n_{γ} = 2.350
- Birefringence: δ = 0.165
- Pleochroism: Visible
- 2V angle: 85° to 90°
- Dispersion: Strong r > v rarely r < v

Descloizite is a rare mineral species consisting of basic lead and zinc vanadate, (Pb, Zn)_{2}(OH)VO_{4}, crystallizing in the orthorhombic crystal system and isomorphous with olivenite. Appreciable gallium and germanium may also be incorporated into the crystal structure.

The color is deep cherry-red to brown or black, and the crystals are transparent or translucent with a greasy lustre; the streak is orange-yellow to brown; specific gravity 5.9 to 6.2; hardness 31/2. A variety known as cuprodescloizite is dull green in color; it contains a considerable amount of copper replacing zinc and some arsenic replacing vanadium. There is also an arsenate analogue called arsendescloizite.

== Discovery and occurrence ==
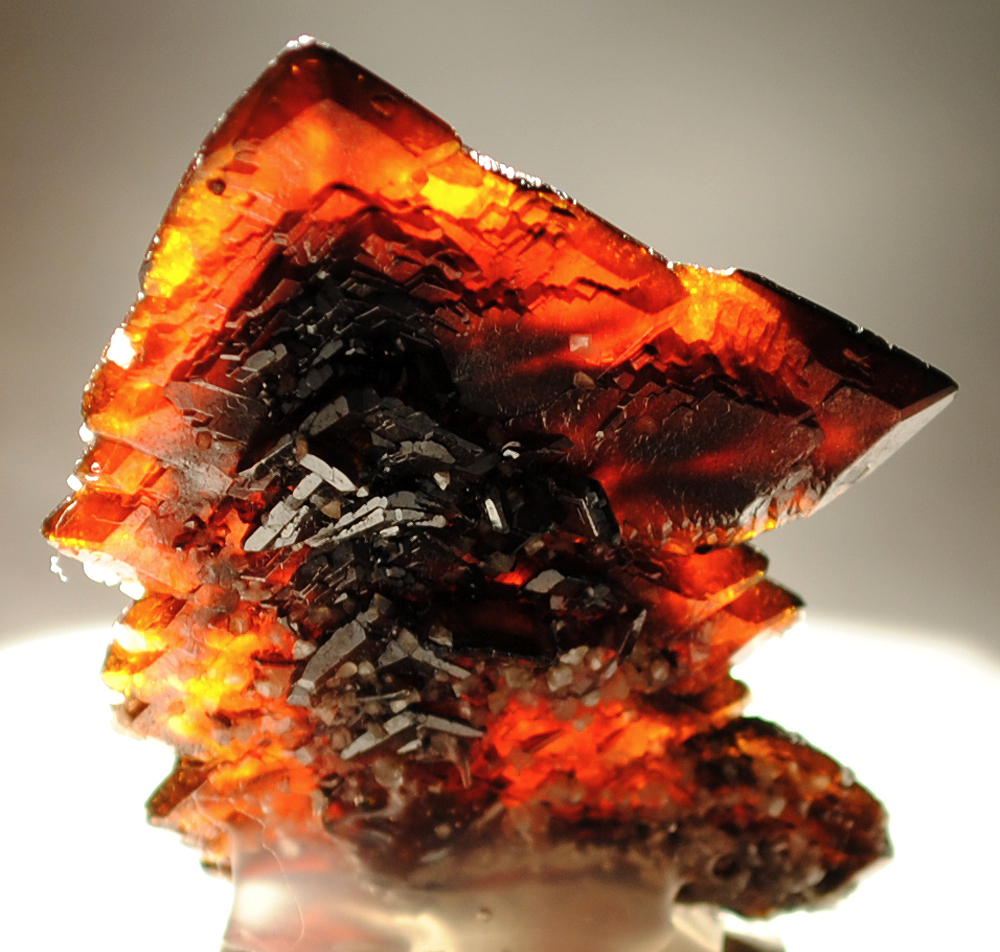
Superb spear-point bladed crystals of descloizite, Berg Aukas, Namibia. Size 3.6 × 3.1 × .9 cm.

It was discovered in the Sierra de Córdoba deposit in Córdoba, Argentina, in 1854 and named in honor of the French mineralogist Alfred Des Cloizeaux (1817–1897). It occurs as small prismatic or pyramidal crystals, usually forming drusy crusts and stalactitic aggregates; also as fibrous encrusting masses with a mammillary surface.

Descloizite occurs in oxidised portions of veins of lead ores in association with pyromorphite, vanadinite, wulfenite, mottramite, mimetite and cerussite.

The Otavi ("O-tarvi") Mountainland of northern Namibia was once considered home to the greatest vanadium deposits in the world, including those at Berg Aukas ("OW-cuss"), Abenab ("UB-en-ub"), Baltika ("BUL-tika") and Uitsab ("ATE-sub"). Descloizite and mottramite were the main ore minerals in each of these deposits, which are now exhausted. Other localities are the Sierra de Cordoba in Argentina; Lake Valley in Sierra County, New Mexico; Arizona; Phoenixville in Pennsylvania and Obir, Carinthia Austria.

== See also ==
- List of minerals
