= Adelite =

Arsenate mineral

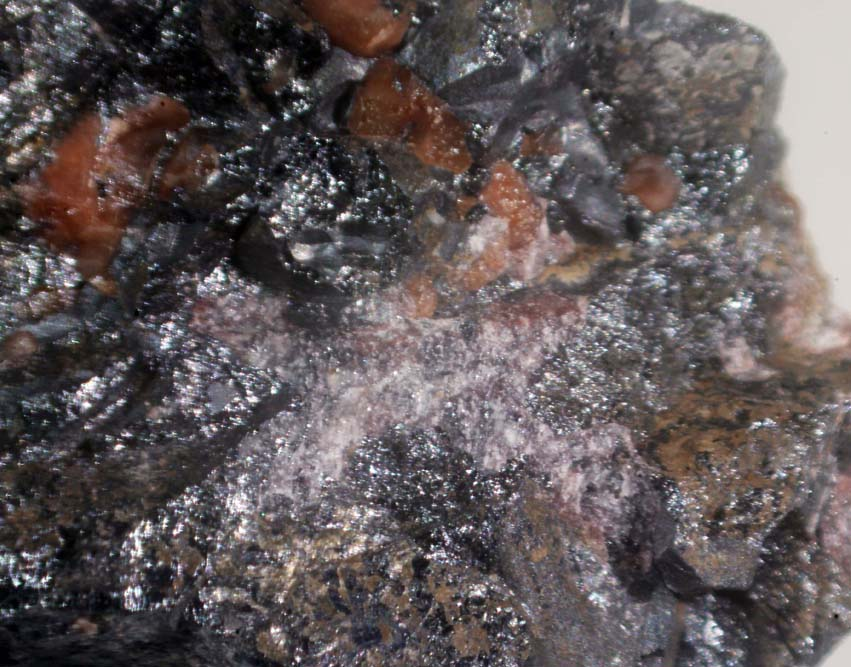
- Pinkish crystal aggregates of adelite from the Franklin deposit in Ogdensburg, New Jersey

General
- Category: Adelite-descloizite group
- Formula: CaMg(AsO_{4})(OH)
- IMA symbol: Ade
- Strunz classification: 8.BH.35
- Dana classification: 41.5.1.1
- Crystal system: Orthorhombic
- Crystal class: 2 2 2 – Disphenoidal
- Space group: P2_{1}2_{1}2_{1}

Identification
- Color: Colourless, white, grey, bluish grey, yellowish grey, yellow, pale green, pinkish brown, brown
- Crystal habit: Elongate crystals, massive
- Cleavage: None observed
- Mohs scale hardness: 5
- Luster: Vitreous, greasy
- Diaphaneity: Transparent, translucent
- Specific gravity: 3.73 to 3.79
- Optical properties: Biaxial (+), colorless (transmitted light)

The rare mineral adelite, is a calcium, magnesium, arsenate with chemical formula CaMgAsO_{4}OH. It forms a solid solution series with the vanadium-bearing mineral gottlobite. Various transition metals substitute for magnesium and lead replaces calcium leading to a variety of similar minerals in the adelite–duftite group.

Adelite forms variably colored (blue, green, yellow and grey) crystals in the orthorhombic crystal system. The form is typically massive. It has a Mohs hardness rating of 5 and a specific gravity of 3.73 to 3.79.

It was first described in 1891 from Värmland, Sweden. Its name comes from the Greek word for indistinct.

== Geologic occurrence ==
Adelite has been found in ore deposits in Algeria, Germany, Italy, Sweden and the US.

== See also ==
- Descloizite
- List of minerals

== Bibliography ==
- Palache, P.; Berman H.; Frondel, C. (1960). "Dana's System of Mineralogy, Volume II: Halides, Nitrates, Borates, Carbonates, Sulfates, Phosphates, Arsenates, Tungstates, Molybdates, Etc. (Seventh Edition)" John Wiley and Sons, Inc., New York, pp. 804–806.
