= Mimetite =

Lead arsenate chloride mineral

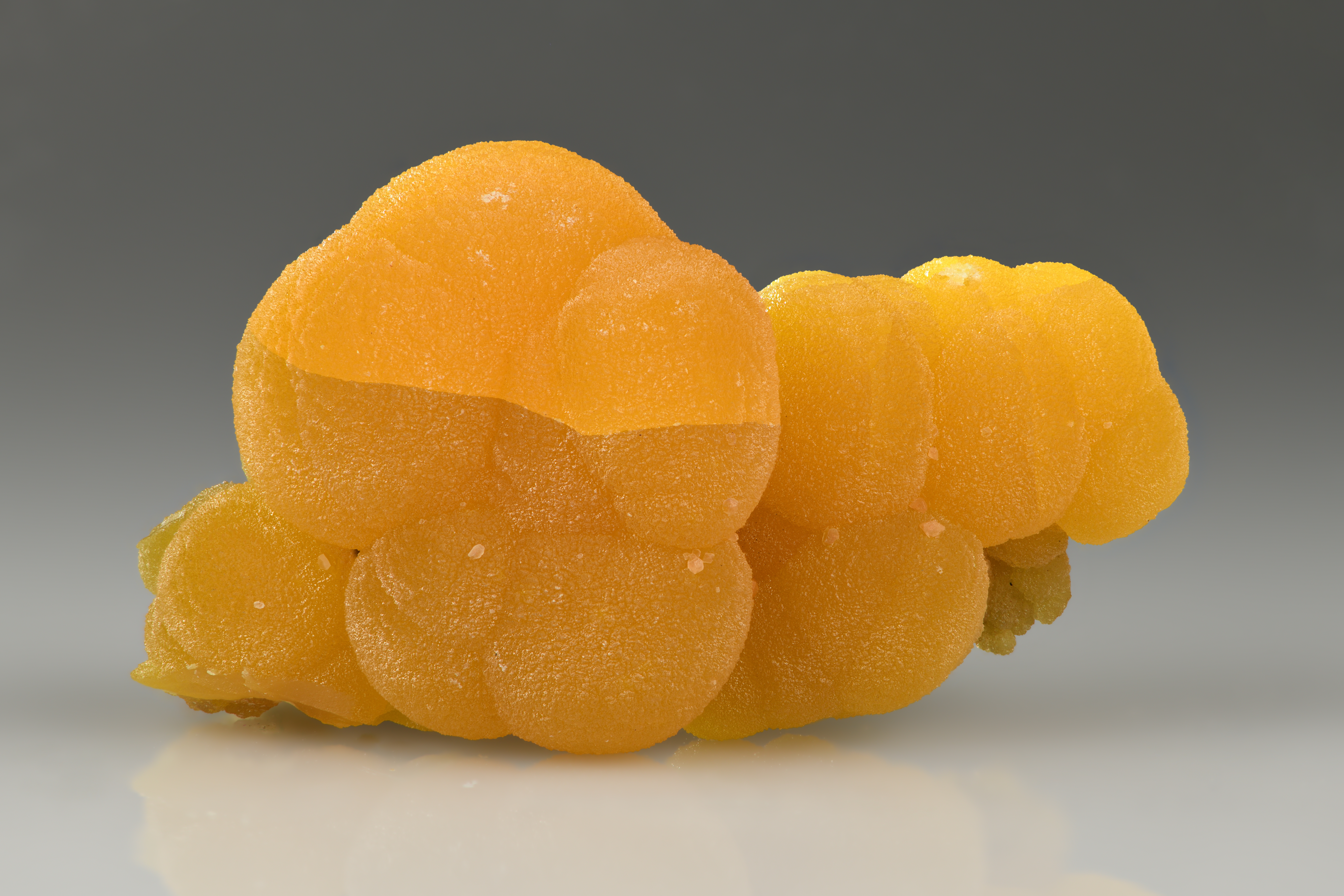
- Golden-yellow botryoidal mimetite from Congreso-León mines, Mexico

General
- Category: Arsenate minerals Apatite group
- Formula: Pb_{5}(AsO_{4})_{3}Cl
- IMA symbol: Mim
- Strunz classification: 8.BN.05
- Crystal system: Hexagonal
- Crystal class: Dipyramidal (6/m) (same H-M symbol)
- Space group: P6_{3}/m
- Unit cell: a = 10.250(2) Å, c = 7.454(1) Å; Z = 2

Identification
- Color: Pale to bright yellow, yellowish brown, yellow-orange, white, may be colorless
- Crystal habit: Prismatic to acicular crystals; reniform, botryoidal, globular,
- Twinning: Rare on {112̅2}
- Cleavage: [101̅1] Imperfect
- Fracture: Brittle, conchoidal
- Tenacity: Brittle
- Mohs scale hardness: 3.5–4
- Luster: Resinous, subadamantine
- Streak: White
- Diaphaneity: Transparent to translucent
- Specific gravity: 7.1–7.24
- Optical properties: Uniaxial (−), anomalously biaxial
- Refractive index: n_{ω} = 2.147 n_{ε} = 2.128
- Birefringence: 0.019
- Pleochroism: Weak

Mimetite is a lead arsenate chloride mineral (Pb_{5}(AsO_{4})_{3}Cl) which forms as a secondary mineral in lead deposits, usually by the oxidation of galena and arsenopyrite. The name derives from the Greek Μιμητής mimetes, meaning "imitator" and refers to mimetite's resemblance to the mineral pyromorphite. This resemblance is not coincidental, as mimetite forms a mineral series with pyromorphite (Pb_{5}(PO_{4})_{3}Cl) and with vanadinite (Pb_{5}(VO_{4})_{3}Cl). Notable occurrences are Mapimi, Durango, Mexico, and Tsumeb, Namibia.

== Properties ==
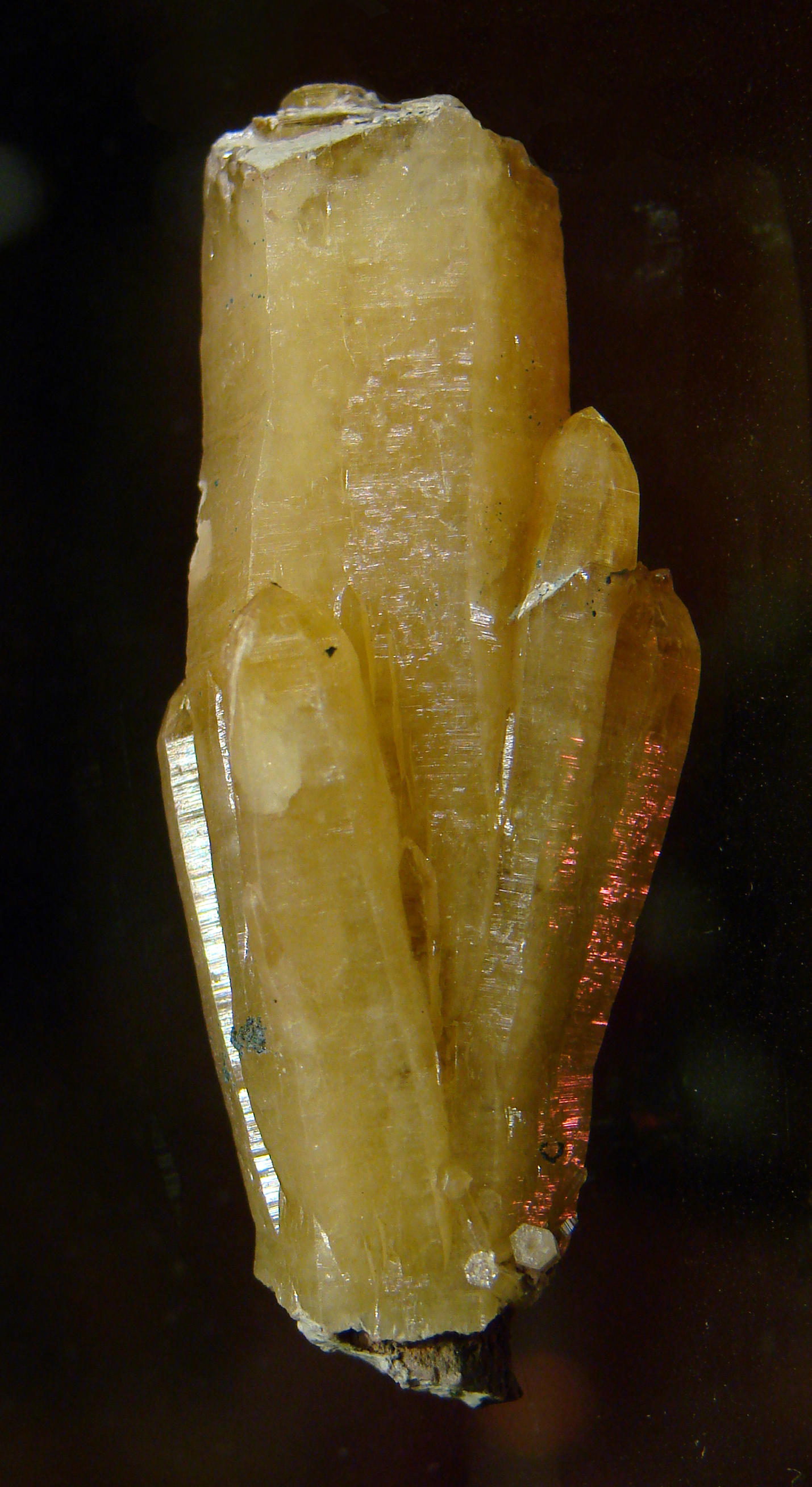
Mimetite from Namibia

Mimetite typically forms short hexagonal crystals that are yellow to brown to orange in color, very brittle, moderately hard (Mohs hardness 3.5–4), and dense (specific gravity 7.24). It is distinctive for its lack of transparency, its resinous to adamantine luster, and its solubility in nitric acid.

Mimetite forms a complete solid solution series with pyromorphite, with phosphate (PO^{3−}_{4}) substituting for arsenate (AsO^{3−}_{4}). The two minerals are almost identical in their properties and can be difficult to distinguish except by laboratory tests. Pyromorphite is the more common mineral at most locales.

Campylite is a name applied to mimetite or pyromorphite that crystallizes as distinctive barrel-shaped crystals forming curved hemispherical aggregates. Bellite is a name formerly applied to a chromium-bearing mimetite, or possibly a mixture of crocoite, mimetite, and quartz, which forms attractive orange red crystals, but has been discredited as a distinct mineral species.

== Occurrences ==
Mimetite is found in association with lead and arsenic minerals, including pyromorphite, cerussite, hemimorphite, smithsonite, vanadinite, anglesite, pyrite, mottramite, willemite, and wulfenite. Good specimens have been reported from Gila County, Arizona, US; Ojocaliente, Zacatecas, Mexico; Cumberland, England; Johanngeorgenstadt, Saxony, Germany; Namibia; and Broken Hill, Australia.

== Mimetite specimen gallery ==
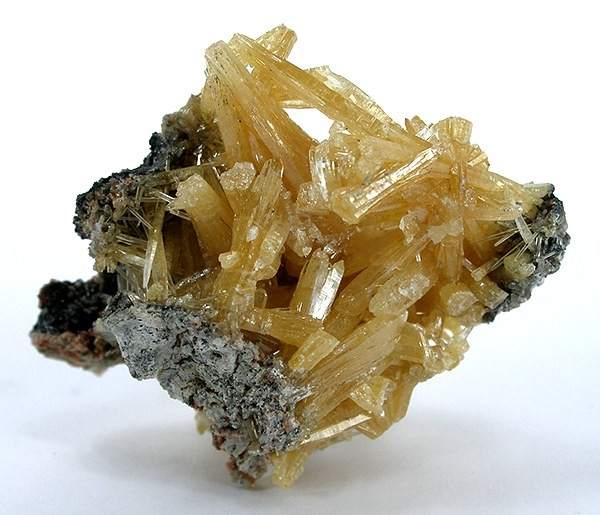
Mimetite from Tsumeb mine, Namibia

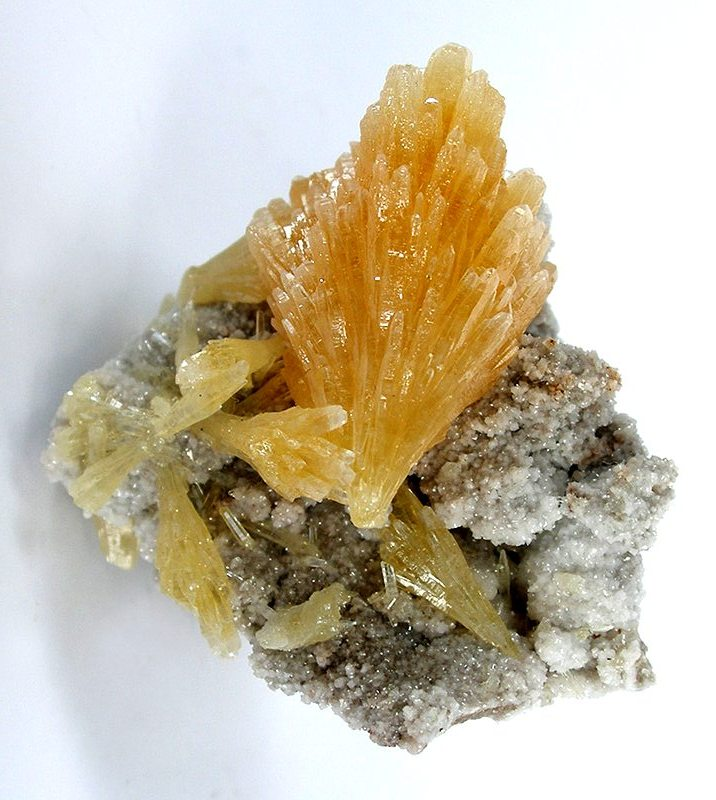
Cluster of translucent, golden mimetite crystals

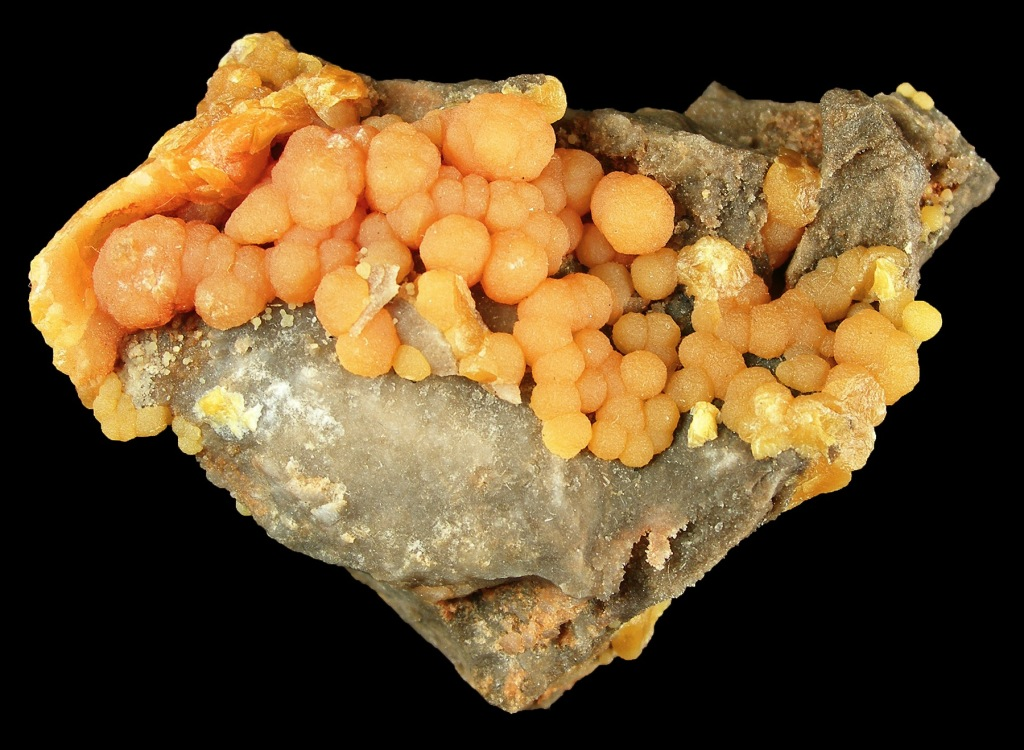
Spherical aggregates of botryoidal mimetite

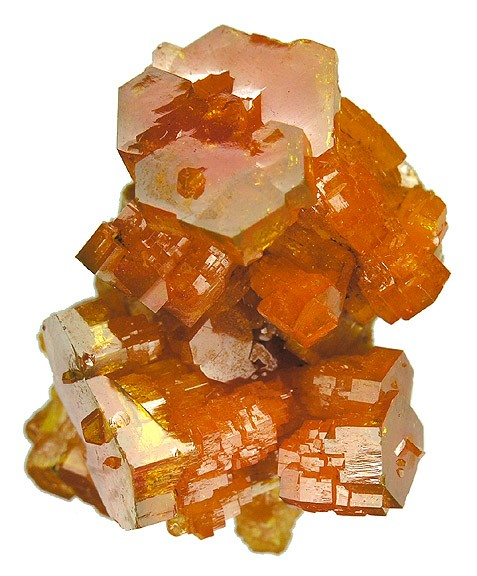
Mimetite, Pingtouling Mine, Guangdong Province, China. Size: 2.2 × 2.1 × 1.8 cm
