= Pyromorphite =

Lead chlorophosphate mineral

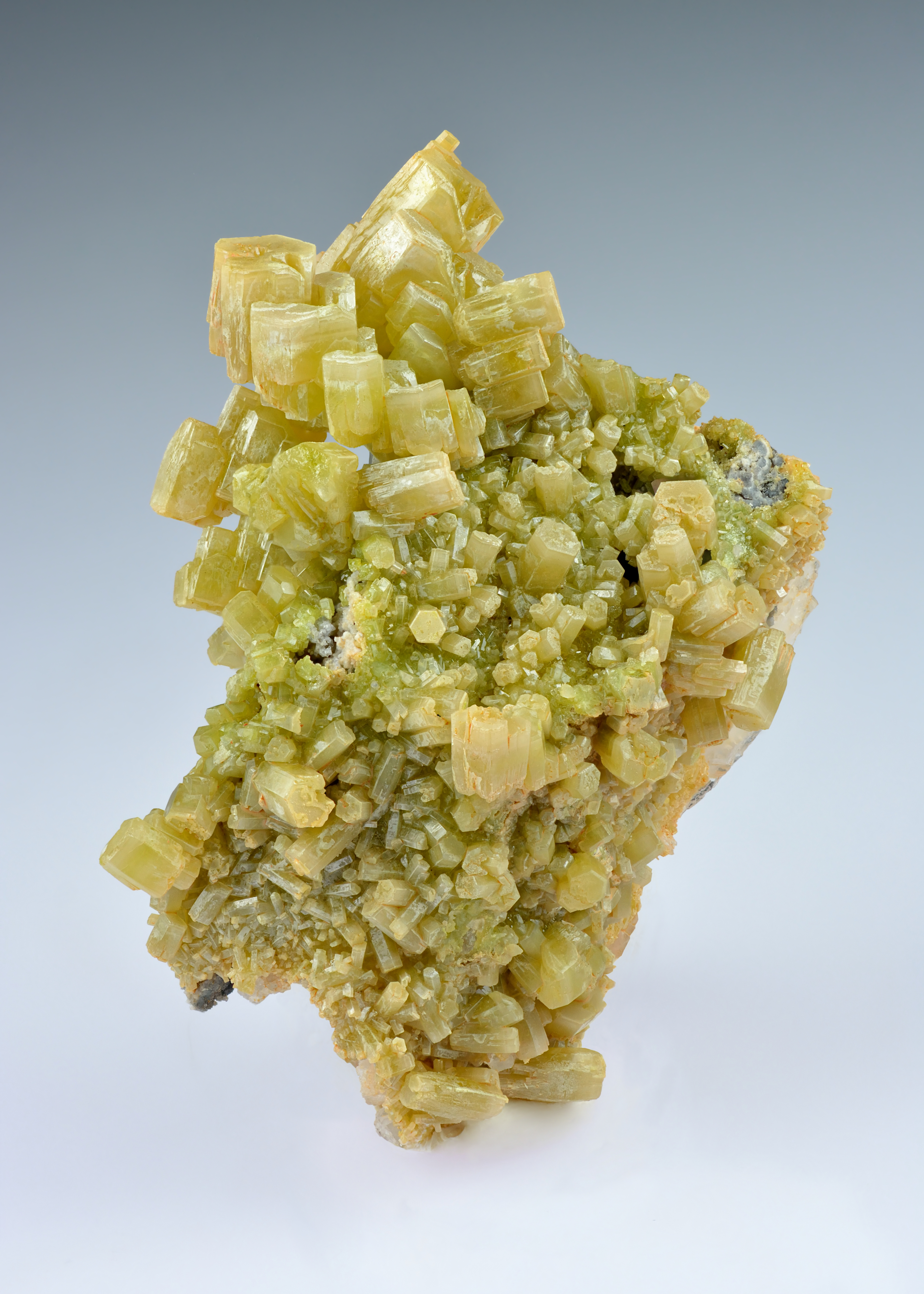

General
- Category: Phosphate mineral Apatite group
- Formula: Pb_{5}(PO_{4})_{3}Cl
- IMA symbol: Pym
- Strunz classification: 8.BN.05
- Crystal system: Hexagonal
- Crystal class: Dipyramidal (6/m) (same H-M symbol)
- Space group: P6_{3}/m

Identification
- Color: Dark green to grass-green or green, yellow, yellow-orange, reddish orange, yellow-brown, greenish-yellow or yellowish-green, shades of brown, tan, grayish, white and may be colorless; colourless or faintly tinted in transmitted light.
- Crystal habit: Prismatic to acicular crystals, globular to reniform
- Twinning: Rarely on {112̅2}
- Cleavage: Imperfect- [101̅1]
- Fracture: Uneven to sub-conchoidal
- Tenacity: Brittle
- Mohs scale hardness: 3.5–4
- Luster: Resinous to subadamantine
- Streak: White
- Diaphaneity: Transparent to translucent
- Specific gravity: 7.04 measured, 7.14 calculated
- Optical properties: Uniaxial (−) May be anomalously biaxial (−)
- Refractive index: n_{ω} = 2.058 n_{ε} = 2.048
- Birefringence: δ = 0.010
- Pleochroism: Weak
- Ultraviolet fluorescence: May fluoresce yellow to orange under LW and SW UV
- Other characteristics: Piezoelectric if biaxial

Pyromorphite is a mineral species composed of lead chlorophosphate: Pb_{5}(PO_{4})_{3}Cl, sometimes occurring in sufficient abundance to be mined as an ore of lead. Crystals are common, and have the form of a hexagonal prism terminated by the basal planes, sometimes combined with narrow faces of a hexagonal pyramid. Crystals with a barrel-like curvature are not uncommon. Globular and reniform masses are also found.

Pyromorphite is part of the apatite group of minerals and bears a close resemblance physically and chemically with two other minerals: mimetite (Pb_{5}(AsO_{4})_{3}Cl) and vanadinite (Pb_{5}(VO_{4})_{3}Cl). The resemblance in external characters is so close that, as a rule, it is only possible to distinguish between them by chemical tests. They were formerly confused under the names green lead ore and brown lead ore (German: Grünbleierz and Braunbleierz).

== History ==
The mineral was first distinguished chemically by M. H. Klaproth in 1784, and it was named pyromorphite by J. F. L. Hausmann in 1813. The name is derived from the Greek for pyr (fire) and morfe (form) due to its crystallization behavior after being melted.

== Properties ==
The color of the mineral is usually some bright shade of green, yellow or brown, and the luster is resinous. The hardness is 3.5 to 4, and the specific gravity between 6.5 and 7.1.

== Isomorphism ==
Owing to isomorphous replacement of the phosphorus by arsenic there may be a gradual passage from pyromorphite to mimetite. Varieties containing calcium isomorphously replacing lead are lower in density (specific gravity 5.9–6.5) and usually lighter in color; they bear the names polysphaerite (because of the globular form), miesite from Stříbro (pronounced Mies in German) in Bohemia, nussierite from Nuizière, Chénelette, near Beaujeu, Rhône, France, and cherokine from Cherokee County in Georgia.

== Biology ==
Paecilomyces javanicus is a fungus collected from a lead-polluted soil that is able to form biominerals of pyromorphite.

== Gallery ==
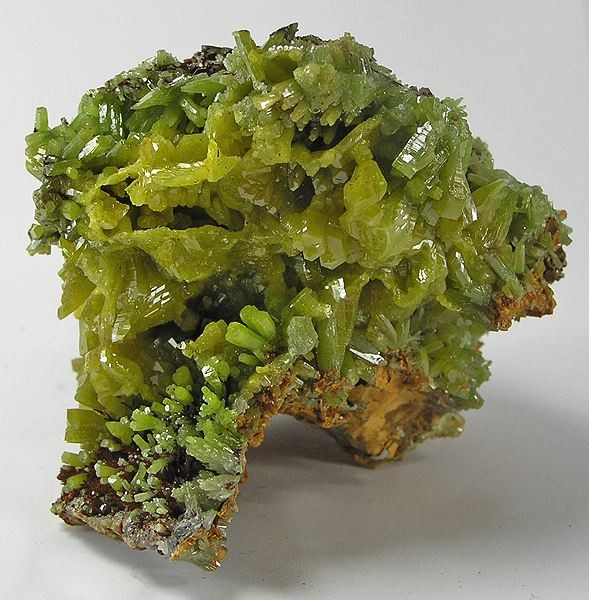
A pocket of crystals of pyromorphite from China

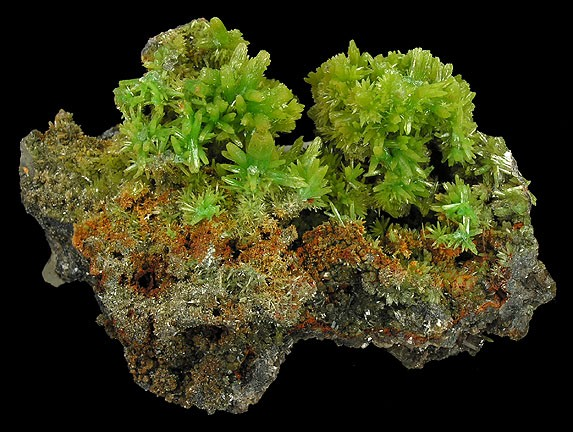
Miniature of sharp, lustrous, apple green color crystal "sprays" on matrix

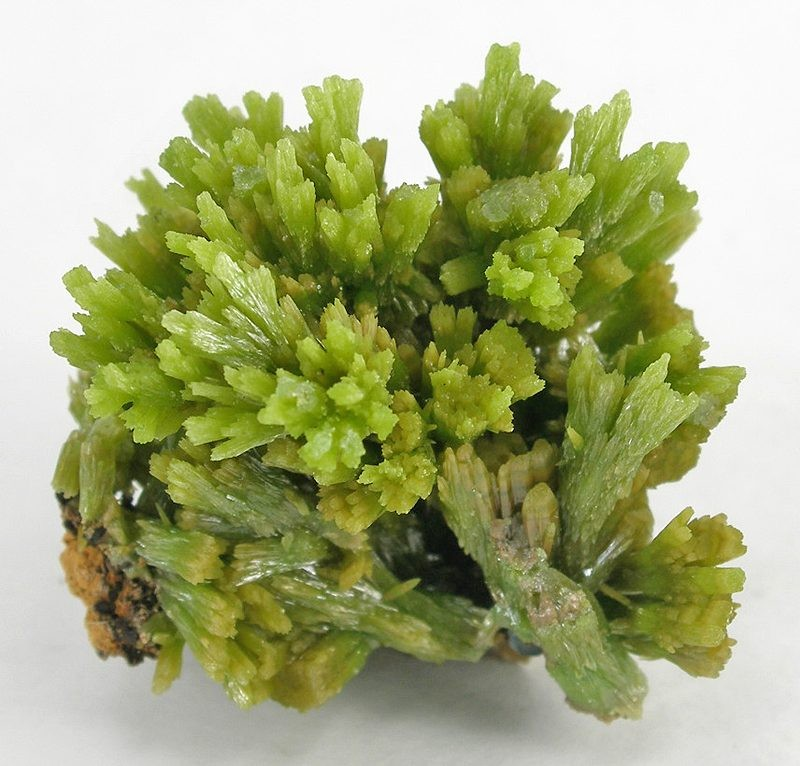
Fine crystals of pyromorphite from Daoping Mine, Guangxi Zhuang Autonomous Region, China

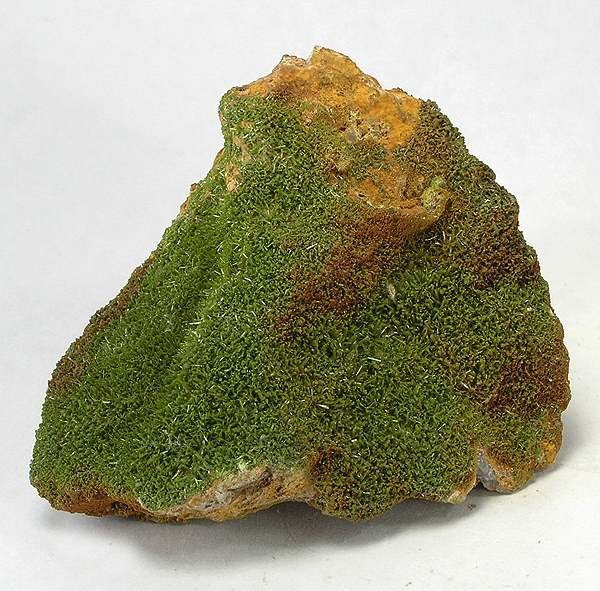
Green pyromorphite crystals densely carpet the display side of the large matrix

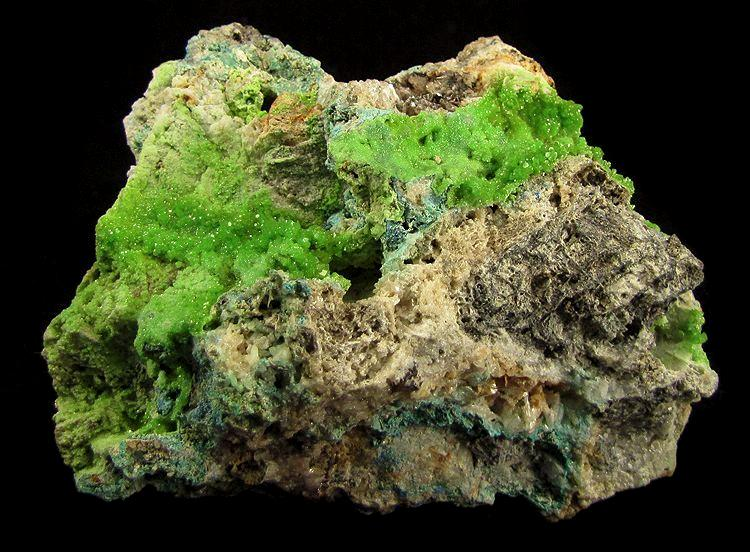
Green pyromorphite microcrystals cover the vuggy, quartz-rich matrix. Seams of tiny cerussite crystals and crusts of contrasting, powder-blue caledonite round out this very rich lead ore specimen from an old Leadhills mine.

== See also ==
- Lead apatite
- List of minerals
