= Botryoidal =

Mineral shape resembling a small bunch of grapes

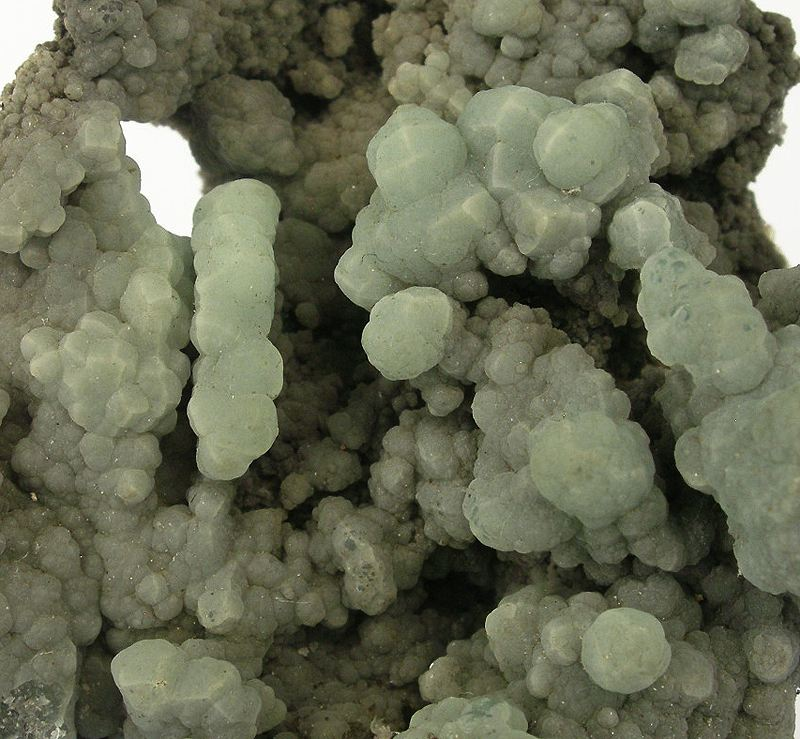
Botryoidal habit of gibbsite crystals

A botryoidal (/ˌbɒtriˈɔɪdəl/ BOT-ree-OY-dəl) texture or mineral habit, is one in which the mineral has an external form composed of many rounded segments, named for the Ancient Greek βότρυς (bótrus), meaning "a bunch of grapes". This is a common form for many minerals, particularly hematite and malachite, which are known for frequently forming botryoidal masses. It is also a common form of goethite, smithsonite, fluorite, and chrysocolla.

Similar habits are reniform (kidney-shaped) and mammillary (breast-shaped or partial spheres).

== Formation ==
Minerals take on a botryoidal habit when they form in an environment containing many nuclei, specks of sand, dust, or other particulate matter to serve as sources of crystal nucleation. Acicular or fibrous crystals grow outward from these "seeds" at the same or very similar rate, resulting in radial crystal growth. As these spheres grow, they can run into or overlap with others that are nearby, fusing together to form a botryoidal cluster. Since botryoidal growths are formed from many smaller crystals, botryoidal habit is usually independent of the specific crystal structure associated with any given mineral. This is how the habit can be observed in a variety of minerals that otherwise display distinct euhedral forms.
