= Tsumcorite =

Rare hydrated lead arsenate mineral

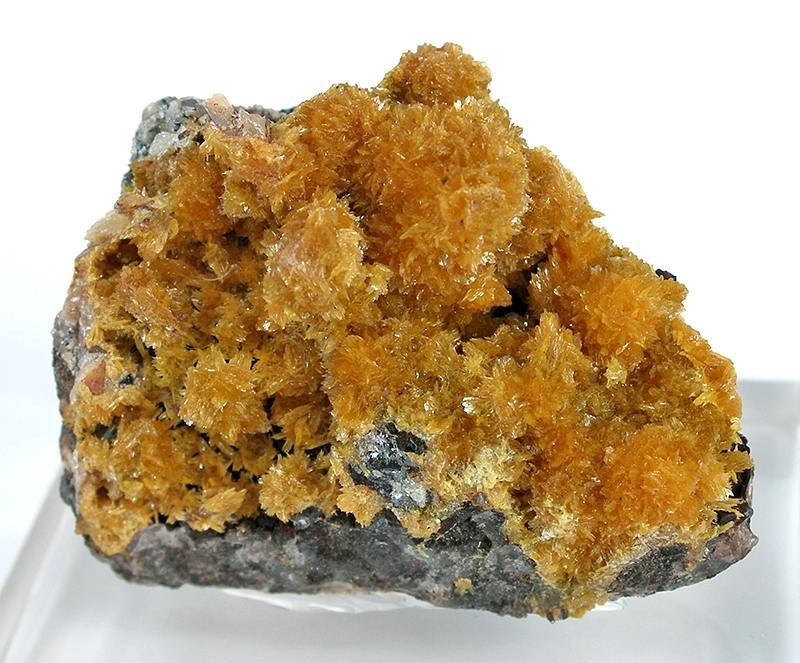
- Tsumcorite from the Tsumeb Mine, Namibia

General
- Category: Arsenate minerals
- Formula: PbZnFe^{2+}(AsO_{4})_{2}.H_{2}O
- IMA symbol: Tmc
- Strunz classification: 8.CG.15
- Dana classification: 40.02.09.01
- Crystal system: Monoclinic
- Crystal class: Prismatic (2/m) (same H-M symbol)
- Space group: C2/m (no. 12)
- Unit cell: a = 9.124 Å, b = 6.329 Å c = 7.577 Å; β = 115.3°; Z = 2

Identification
- Formula mass: 624.29 g/mol
- Color: Yellow-brown, red-brown, orange
- Crystal habit: Radiating, fibrous crusts
- Twinning: Common, on an unknown law
- Cleavage: Good on {001}
- Mohs scale hardness: 4 1/2
- Luster: Vitreous
- Streak: Yellow
- Diaphaneity: Translucent
- Specific gravity: 5.2
- Optical properties: Biaxial
- Refractive index: n_{α} = 1.87–1.91 n_{β} = 1.89–1.93 n_{γ} = 1.92–1.96
- Pleochroism: Weak, yellow to yellow-green
- 2V angle: 67–83.5°
- Solubility: Dissolves in HCl

Tsumcorite is a rare hydrated lead arsenate mineral that was discovered in 1971, and reported by Geier, Kautz and Muller. It was named after the TSUMeb CORporation mine at Tsumeb, in Namibia, in recognition of the Corporation's support for mineralogical investigations of the orebody at its Mineral Research Laboratory.

== Unit cell ==
Tsumcorite belongs to the monoclinic crystal class 2/m, which means that it has a twofold axis of symmetry along the b axis and a mirror plane perpendicular to this, in the plane containing the a and c axes. The a and c axes are inclined to each other at angle β = 115.3°. The unit cell parameters are a = 9.124 Å to 9.131 Å, b = 6.326 Å to 6.329 Å and c = 7.577 Å to 7.583 Å. There are two formula units per unit cell (Z = 2), and the space group is C2/m, meaning that the cell is a C-face centred lattice, with lattice points in the center of the C face as well as at the corners of the cell. The structure is related to the brackebushite group structure.

== Mineral series ==
Tsumcorite belongs to the helmutwinklerite group, whose members are

- tsumcorite PbZnFe^{2+}(AsO_{4})_{2}.H_{2}O
- helmutwinklerite PbZn_{2}(AsO_{4})_{2}.2H_{2}O
- thometzekite PbCu^{2+}_{2}(AsO_{4})_{2}.2H_{2}O
- mawbyite PbFe^{3+}_{2}(AsO_{4})_{2}(OH)_{2}

Tsumcorite forms a series with helmutwinklerite as Zn replaces the Fe^{2+}, with thometzekite as Cu replaces the Zn and Fe^{2+}, and also with mawbyite.

== Crystal habit and properties ==
Crystals are prismatic, elongated along the b axis, or wedge-shaped. They occur in radiating sheaves and spherulites, and as fibrous crusts or earthy and powdery material. Cleavage is good perpendicular to the c axis, and twinning is common.

Tsumcorite is yellow-brown, red-brown or orange in color, and it is one of the few minerals that have a yellow streak (orpiment and crocoite are two others). It is translucent, with a vitreous luster, and dichroic yellow to yellow-green. The optical class is biaxial and the refractive indices are approximately equal to 1.90.

The mineral is moderately hard, with a Mohs hardness of 4 1/2, between fluorite and apatite, and quite heavy, due to the lead content, with specific gravity 5.2, which is more than baryte but less than cerussite. It dissolves in hydrochloric acid and it is not radioactive.

== Occurrence and associations ==
Tsumcorite is a rare secondary mineral in the oxidized zone of some arsenic-bearing hydrothermal lead-zinc deposits.

The type locality is the Tsumeb Mine, Tsumeb, Otjikoto Region, Namibia, where it is associated with willemite, smithsonite, mimetite, scorodite, anglesite, arseniosiderite, beaverite, beudantite, carminite, ludlockite, o'danielite, zincroselite, stranskiite and leiteite. At the Puttapa Mine in Australia it occurs with adamite, mimetite, smithsonite, goethite and quartz. At the Kintore Open Cut, Broken Hill, Australia it occurs with segnitite, beudantite, carminite and mawbyite.
