= Ashburtonite =

Rare lead copper silicate-bicarbonate mineral

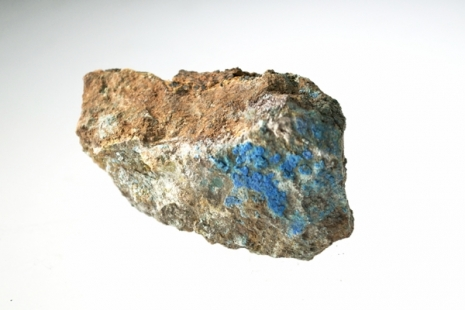

General
- Category: Cyclosilicates
- Formula: HPb_{4}Cu_{4}Si_{4}O_{12}(HCO_{3})_{4}(OH)_{4}Cl
- IMA symbol: Ahb
- Strunz classification: 9.CF.05
- Crystal system: Tetragonal
- Crystal class: Dipyramidal (4/m); H-M symbol: (4/m)
- Space group: I4/m
- Unit cell: a = 14.23, c = 6.1 [Å]; Z = 2

Identification
- Color: Blue
- Crystal habit: Prismatic, needle like in clusters
- Cleavage: None
- Fracture: Conchoidal
- Tenacity: Brittle
- Luster: Vitreous to adamantine
- Streak: light blue
- Diaphaneity: Transparent
- Specific gravity: Greater than 4.07, calculated 4.69
- Optical properties: Uniaxial (+)
- Refractive index: n_{ω} = 1.786 n_{ε} = 1.800
- Birefringence: 0.0140

Ashburtonite is a rare lead copper silicate-bicarbonate mineral with formula: HPb_{4}Cu^{2+}_{4}Si_{4}O_{12}(HCO_{3})_{4}(OH)_{4}Cl.

== Geological occurrence ==
Ashburtonite was first described as a secondary mineral in a shear zone in a series of shales and graywackes. It is an alteration product of galena and chalcopyrite. The secondary minerals within the shear consist of carbonates, arsenates, and sulfates of lead and copper, and to a much lesser extent of zinc and iron. Ashburtonite is associated with beudantite, brochantite, caledonite, cerussite, diaboleite, duftite, malachite, plattnerite, adamite, antlerite, bayldonite, bindheimite, carminite, chenevixite, chlorargyrite, chrysocolla, cinnabar, hemimorphite, hydrozincite, jarosite, lavendulan, linarite, mimetite, olivenite, paratacamite, and rosasite.

Ashburtonite was first described in 1991 for an occurrence in the Anticline prospects 11 km (6.8 mi) southwest of Ashburton Downs in the Capricorn Range of Western Australia. It has also been reported from the Tonopah–Belmont Mine in the Big Horn Mountains of Maricopa County, Arizona.
