= Arsenate sulfate =

Compound

Arsenate sulfate refers to a class of inorganic compounds containing both arsenate (AsO^{3−}_{4}) and sulfate (SO^{2−}_{4}) anions, often found in mineral forms or as secondary products in geochemical and industrial processes. These compounds are typically associated with arsenic-rich environments, such as mine tailings, hydrothermal systems, and hypersaline lakes, where arsenic and sulfur coexist. Arsenate sulfates are of interest in mineralogy, environmental chemistry, and biogeochemistry due to their role in arsenic mobility, toxicity, and microbial interactions. A notable example is beudantite.

== Chemistry and structure ==
Arsenate sulfates are mixed anion compounds that incorporate arsenate (AsO^{3−}_{4}) and sulfate (SO^{2−}_{4}) anions, coordinated with metal cations. The arsenate ion consists of a central arsenic atom (oxidation state +5) tetrahedrally coordinated with four oxygen atoms, carrying a −3 charge. The sulfate ion, similarly tetrahedral, has a sulfur atom (oxidation state +6) bonded to four oxygen atoms, with a −2 charge. In arsenate sulfates, these anions may form distinct structural units or substitute for each other due to their similar tetrahedral geometry and charge. For example, beudantite, PbFe_{3}(OH)_{6}(SO_{4})(AsO_{4}), exhibits a layered alunite-type structure. Solubility is low (K_{sp} ≈ 10^{−20} to 10^{−30}), but acidic conditions (pH < 3) or microbial activity can mobilize arsenic. The compounds are stable under oxidizing conditions but may reduce to arsenite (arsenic(III)) phases in anoxic environments.

== Natural occurrence ==
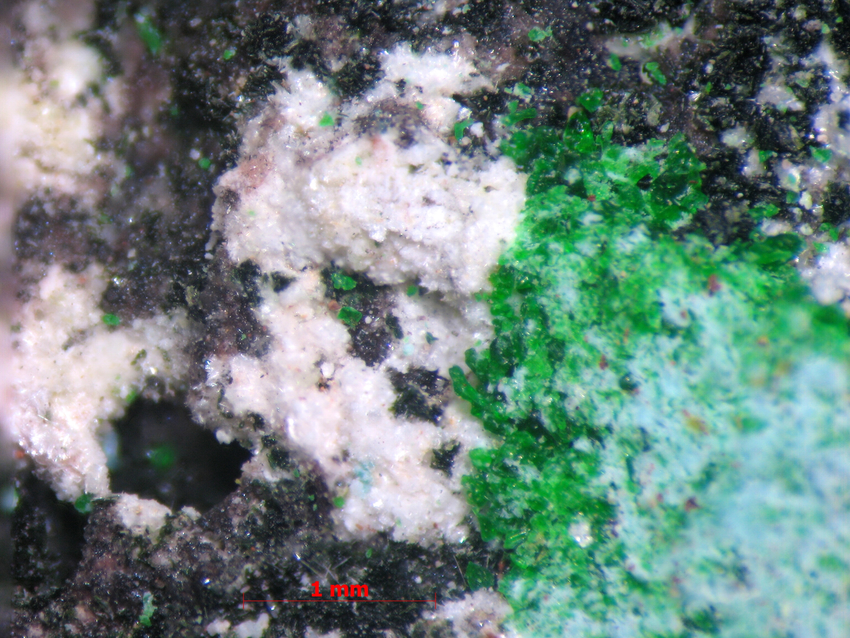
Nishanbaevite, an arsenate sulfate mineral found in fumaroles

Arsenate sulfates occur naturally as minerals in oxidized zones of arsenic-rich ore deposits and anthropogenically in acid mine drainage (AMD) and smelting residues and hypersaline lakes. Notable examples include:

- Beudantite PbFe_{3}(AsO_{4})(SO_{4})(OH)_{6}: Found in Tsumeb, Namibia, and acid mine drainage sites, with a yellow-green hue and alunite-type structure.
- Jarosite-arsenojarosite series KFe_{3}(AsO_{4},SO_{4})_{2}(OH)_{6}: Common in acidic sulfate-rich environments, with arsenate (AsO^{3−}_{4}, As(V)) substituting for sulfate, distinct from arsenite (AsO^{3−}_{3}, As(III)) or elemental arsenic (As(0)) phases.

These minerals form in acidic (pH 2–5), oxidizing environments where sulfate and arsenate ions co-precipitate with Fe^{3+} or Pb^{2+}. Global occurrences include the Carnoulès mine, France, and gold mines in Nevada, USA. In hypersaline lakes like Mono Lake and Searles Lake, California, arsenate and sulfate ions contribute to arsenic cycling, influenced by microbial reduction processes. Anthropogenic sources dominate due to mining and smelting activities.

== Formation processes ==
Arsenate sulfates form through abiotic and biotic processes in arsenic- and sulfur-rich environments. Abiotically, they precipitate during the oxidation of sulfide minerals (such as arsenopyrite, FeAsS) in AMD or hydrothermal systems, where arsenate and sulfate ions co-precipitate with metal cations. For example, pressure oxidation (POX) of refractory gold ores produces sulfoarsenates as residues, with compositions like phase 3 (Fe_{0.9–1.3}As_{0.3–0.6}S_{0.4–0.7}O_{4}(OH)_{0.3–3.3}).Biotically, bacteria like Thiobacillus mediate arsenate sulfate formation by oxidizing sulfide or reducing arsenate, as seen in Mono Lake sediments. Microbial sulfate reduction under anoxic conditions can couple with arsenate reduction, forming arsenate sulfates in the presence of iron. pH and redox potential (pe) control speciation: arsenate dominates in oxygenated, high-pe waters, while arsenite prevails in anoxic, low-pe conditions. Pourbaix diagrams illustrate these transitions, with arsenate sulfates stable at neutral to acidic pH.

== Environmental impact ==
Arsenate sulfates play a dual role in environmental arsenic dynamics. On one hand, they immobilize arsenic in stable mineral phases (such as sulfoarsenates), reducing its bioavailability in mine tailings and sediments. Jarosite's ability to incorporate arsenate limits arsenic release in AMD. On the other hand, elevated sulfate concentrations in water can trigger arsenic desorption from sediments, as sulfate competes with arsenate for adsorption sites on iron oxides and hydroxides. A 2021 study showed that 10% of desorbed arsenic results from competitive adsorption, 21% from iron oxide reduction, and 69% from microbial activity. In hypersaline lakes, microbial arsenate and sulfate reduction cycles mobilize arsenic, increasing its environmental risk. Arsenate sulfates contribute to arsenic contamination in groundwater when dissolved, posing health risks like arsenic poisoning upon chronic exposure. Their toxicity stems from arsenate's similarity to phosphate, disrupting biochemical reactions.

== Examples ==
	Chemical formula	Crystal system	Space group	Unit cell	Volume	Density	Comments	References
Nishanbaevite	KAl_{2}O(AsO_{4})(SO_{4})	orthorhombic	Pbcm	a = 15.487 b = 7.258 c = 6.601 Z = 4	742.1	3.012	biaxial (–), α = 1.552, β ≈ γ = 1.567	
Vasilseverginite	Cu_{9}O_{4}(AsO_{4})_{2}(SO_{4})_{2}	monoclinic	P2_{1}/n	a = 8.1131 b = 9.9182 c = 11.0225 β = 110.855° Z = 2	828.84		biaxial (–), α 1.816, β 1.870, γ 1.897, 2V ~ 30(15)°	
Beudantite	PbFe_{3}(OH)_{6}SO_{4}AsO_{4}	trigonal	R3_m	a = 7.32, c = 17.02 Z=3	789.79	4.48	Uniaxial (−) n_{ω} = 1.957 n_{ε} = 1.943 Birefringence: 0.014	
Gallobeudantite	PbGa_{3}(AsO_{4})(SO_{4})(OH)_{6}	trigonal	R3m	a = 7.225, c = 17.03 Z=3	769.88	4.87	uniaxial (–) n_{ω} = 1.763 n_{ε} = 1.750	
Parnauite	Cu_{9}(AsO_{4})_{2}(SO_{4})(OH)_{10}·7H_{2}O	Orthorhombic	Pmn2_{1}	a = 3.0113 b = 14.259 c = 14.932 Z=1	641.15	3.09	Biaxial (−) n_{α} = 1.680 n_{β} = 1.704 n_{γ} = 1.712 2V 60° Birefringence: δ = 0.032	
Zýkaite	Fe_{4}(AsO_{4})_{3}(SO_{4})(OH)⋅15H_{2}O	Orthorhombic	P222	a = 20.85 b = 7.033 c = 36.99		2.50	Niaxial (−) n_{α} = 1.632 n_{β} = 1.635–1.636 n_{γ} = 1.646	
	K_{4}(SO_{4})(HSO_{4})_{2}(H_{3}AsO_{4})	triclinic	P1_	a=8.9076 b=10.1258 c=10.6785 α=72.525°, β=66.399°, γ=65.516°, Z=2	792.74			
	Rb_{4}(SO_{4})(HSO_{4})_{2}(H_{3}AsO_{4})	monoclinic	P2_{1}	a = 5.868 b = 13.579, c = 11.809 β = 94,737°				
	Rb_{3}(HSO_{4})_{2.5}(H_{2}AsO_{4})_{0.5}	triclinic	P	a = 7.471 b = 7.636 c = 12.193 α = 71.91° β = 73.04° γ = 88.77°			superprotonic phase over 404 K; decompose 473K	
	Cs_{2}(HSO_{4})(H_{2}AsO_{4})	monoclinic	P2_{1}/n					
