= Mawbyite =

Minerals

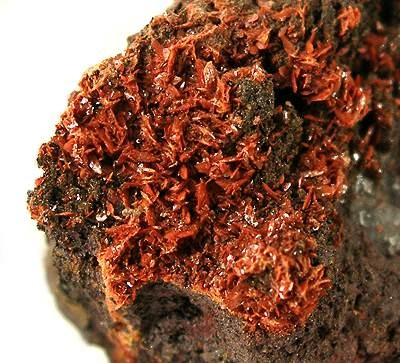

General
- Category: Minerals
- Formula: Pb(Fe^{3+},Zn)_{2}(AsO_{4})_{2}(OH)_{2}
- IMA symbol: Mby
- Strunz classification: 08.CG.15
- Dana classification: 40.02.09.04
- Crystal system: Monoclinic
- Crystal class: Prismatic; H-M Symbol: 2/m
- Space group: B2/m
- Unit cell: 391.13

Identification
- Formula mass: 649.02
- Color: Pale brown to orange-brown to bright reddish brown
- Crystal habit: Spherical or wheat sheaf shaped crystals
- Twinning: Common, V-shaped at about {100}
- Cleavage: Good on {001}
- Fracture: Conchoidal
- Mohs scale hardness: 4
- Luster: Adamantine
- Streak: Orange-yellow
- Diaphaneity: Transparent to translucent
- Specific gravity: 5.365
- Density: 5.5
- Optical properties: Biaxial (−)
- Refractive index: n_{α} = 1.940(2) n_{β} = 2.000(2) n_{γ} = 2.040(2)
- Birefringence: 0.100
- Pleochroism: Weak; Brown to reddish brown
- 2V angle: Measured: 80° (5); Calculated: 76°
- Dispersion: Relatively weak
- Length fast/slow: Length-fast
- Ultraviolet fluorescence: None

Mawbyite is a lead iron zinc arsenate that was named in honor of Maurice Alan Edgar Mawby. It has been approved by the IMA in 1988, and was published just a year after being described by Pring. Mawbyite is a member of the tsumcorite group, the monoclinic dimorph of carminite. It was first believed to be tsumcorite; however, crystal-structure determination showed iron and zinc occupying the same crystallographic site instead, and through the analysis it turned out mawbyite is isostructural with tsumcorite, meaning the two share a similar formula. More accurately, mawbyite appears to be the ferric analogue of the aforementioned mineral. The relationship between helmutwinklerite – which shares a similar formula with tsumcorite's – and mawbyite had been suggested, but due to lack of data it remains unclear. A full crystal-structure analysis is required in order to understand the relationship between their structures.

== Visual properties ==
Mawbyite occurs in pale brown to orange-brown to bright reddish brown colors. The iron in mawbyite's formula may be replaced with minor zinc. Its color seems to be closely correlated to its composition. Specimens which contain an equal ratio of iron to zinc in their composition tend to be more orange, while the reddish specimens' composition is closer to the pure iron end member. The color of the streak of the mineral doesn't change however despite the range in composition. It has a weak pleochroism, which is an optical phenomenon. Depending on which axis the mineral is inspected on, it appears to be changing colors. Mawbyite appears to go from brown to reddish brown in color. Just like its color, mawbyite's optical properties differ based on its composition. With increased iron content, its refractive indices also increase. For pure iron end members, all of the indices are above 2.

Mawbyite has a number of habits, the most prevalent one being a "dogtooth"-like bladed crystals, which can reach up to 0.15 mm in length, and the dominant forms include {110}, {1̅01} and with minor {001}. It can form cylindrical, hemispherical, and wheat-sheaf aggregates with a platy or spongy appearance. Another habit is in the form of scattered clusters of prismatic crystals as coatings, which can reach up to 0.2 mm in length. It may also occur as tabular crystals with V-shaped twins with composition plane (100). It rarely forms tabular crystals however, prismatic habit is more common. The mineral had also been observed to be able to form thin compact crusts. Mawbyite has a conchoidal fracture, where breaking it results in smooth and curvy surfaces resembling a seashell.

== Chemical properties ==
The pure ferric end-member of the mineral is dimorphous with carminite, meaning they share the same formula but form different crystal structures. Furthermore, the unit cells of the two minerals are related. Mawbyite does not show any radioactive or fluorescent properties. It mainly consists of lead (35.12%), oxygen (24.16%), arsenic (23.09%) and iron (16.35%) by weight, but otherwise has zinc (1.01%) and contains a negligible amount of hydrogen (0.28%) as well. Due to lack of material of any composition, it could not be determined whether the mineral has water content in its composition, hence it is unknown whether the endmember is anhydrous or not. Due to the similarities between mawbyite and tsumcorite in systematic absences in the powder data, and due to laue symmetry, the space group is believed to be C2/m. It forms drusy crusts in spessartine- and quartz-rich host rocks in small cavities and on fractures, by the oxidation of primary sulfides and arsenites under less acidic pH conditions compared to its dimorph, which forms at around a level of 3 in pH. The type of the principal rocks which host the mineral are almost entirely made of quartz and spessartine. These hosts are friable to compact granular metamorphic rocks. In quartz, they line solution cavities. Due to its appearance, it may be confused with another lead-iron-arsenate, arsenbrackebuschite, although the latter has a much higher lead content.

== Occurrences ==
At Broken Hill, Australia, mawbyite can be found in a reaction halo that is rich in arsenic. The crystals occur in the oxidization zone of a metamorphosed stratiform lead-zinc orebody. At Moldava in the Czech Republic, it can be found in the oxidization zone of silver-lead-copper-bismuth mineralization in fluorite, barite, and quartz veins. At the former location, mawbyite is associated with duftite, bayldonite, hidalgoite, pharmacosiderite, segnitite, corkite-beudantite, adamite-olivenite, and other iron-manganese oxides. At the latter location, it is associated with mimetite, thometzekite and philipsbornite. Goethite is also described as an associated mineral in the form of substrate, just as manganese oxides. It is also said to be in close proximity with a copper-iron-lead arsenate which is yet to be described.
