= Segnitite =

Common iron oxide mineral

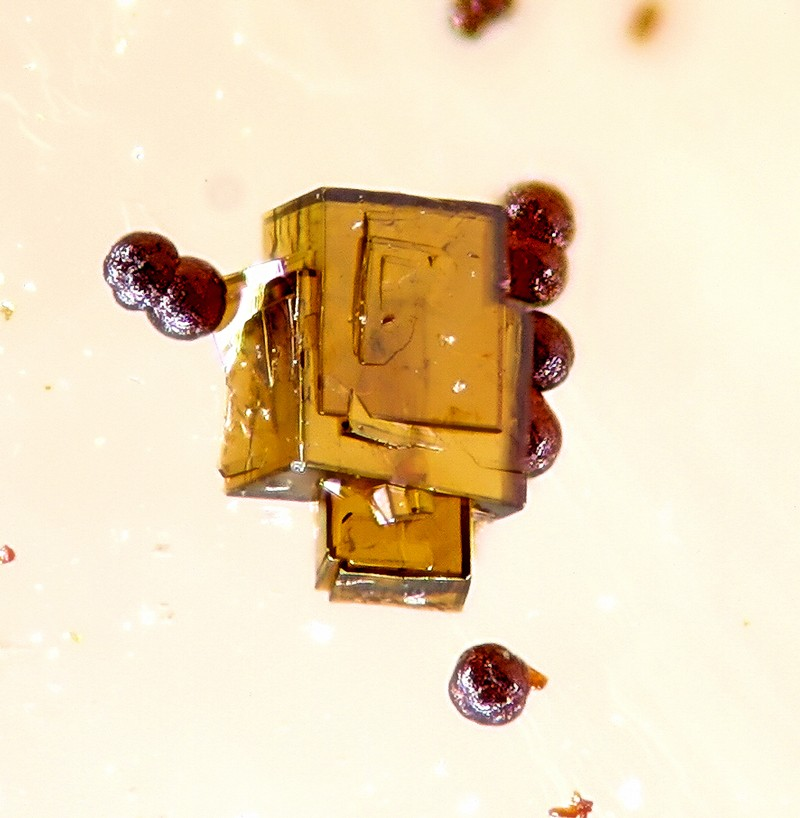
- Segnitite with lepidocrocite from the Alto das Quelhas do Gestoso Mines, Gestoso, Manhouce, São Pedro do Sul, Viseu District, Portugal. Picture width 1 mm. Yellow brown segnitite with red brown lepidocrocite.

General
- Category: Arsenate minerals
- Formula: Lead iron(III) arsenate, PbFe_{3}H(AsO_{4})_{2}(OH)_{6}
- IMA symbol: Sgt
- Strunz classification: 7/B.36-165
- Dana classification: 42.7.4.4
- Crystal system: Trigonal
- Crystal class: Hexagonal scalenohedral – 3̅m (3̅2/m)
- Space group: R3̅m
- Unit cell: a = 7.359(3) Å, c = 17.113(8) Å, V = 802.6(6) Å^{3+}, Z = 6

Identification
- Color: Greenish brown to yellowish brown and dark brown
- Crystal habit: Tabular, rhombohedral, pseudo-octahedral, pseudo-cubic and very rarely also acicular crystals.
- Twinning: Not well observed
- Cleavage: Distinct on {001}
- Fracture: Rough, irregular, uneven
- Tenacity: Brittle
- Mohs scale hardness: 4
- Luster: Adamantine to vitreous
- Streak: Pale yellow
- Diaphaneity: Transparent to translucent
- Specific gravity: 4.2
- Optical properties: Uniaxial (−), e=1.955, w=1.975
- Refractive index: n_{ω} = 1.955 to 1.975, n_{ε} = 1.975
- Birefringence: δ = 0.020
- Pleochroism: Pale to moderate yellow

Segnitite is a lead iron(III) arsenate mineral. Segnitite was first found in the Broken Hill ore deposit in Broken Hill, New South Wales, Australia. In 1991, segnitite was approved as a new mineral. Segnitite has since been found worldwide near similar locality types where rocks are rich in zinc and lead especially. It was named for Australian mineralogist, gemologist and petrologist Edgar Ralph Segnit. The mineral was named after E. R. Segnit due to his contributions to Australian mineralogy.

Segnitite is not a primary ore mineral, but is found amongst other well known ore minerals such as galena, sphalerite, pyrite and more. Many minerals found with segnitite are important for industrial purposes. Minerals associated with segnitite make up metal alloys, batteries and even pigments. Carminite and beudanite are closely related to segnitite. In fact, forms of beudanite are commonly confused with segnitite, as the sulfate and arsenate anions are readily exchangeable with each other. Other mineral relations include, goethite, coronadite, agardite, bayldonite, and mimetite.

Set parameters for the space group and chemical composition have yet to be confirmed. Segnitite has loose boundaries and conclusions about segnitite were derived from associated minerals. Chemically, there are many varieties of segnitite which affects space group measurements and chemical analysis interpretations. In other words, segnitite samples from around the world can be very different from one another making it difficult to provide accurate chemical measurements.

== Chemical composition ==
The mineral segnitite is a part of the alunite-jarosite family which is a part of the alunite supergroup, which has a general formula of AB_{3}(TO_{4})_{2}(OH)_{6}. Minerals in the alunite-jarosite family have the general formula AB_{3}(XO_{4})_{2}(OH)_{6}. More specifically, Segnitite is a part of the low-S lusungite group of alunite-jarosite minerals. The lusungite group falls on the lower third of the ternary diagram, with the jarosite group on top, having the highest content of sulfur. The beudantite-corkite group lies in the middle third on the ternary diagram, possessing intermediate amounts of sulfur. The lusungite group then has the lowest amount of sulfur, and has end members segnitite and lusungite, which then have varying amounts of arsenic to phosphorus; segnitite is the arsenic rich end member of the lusugnite group.

Through electron microprobe analysis on the basis of 14 oxygen atoms, the empirical formula of segnitite was found to be (Pb_{1.05}Ba_{0.03})_{1.08}(Fe_{2.76}Zn_{0.22}Al_{0.17}Cu_{0.01})_{3.16}[(AsO_{4})_{1.85}(PO_{4})_{0.05}(SO_{4})_{0.04}]_{1.94}(OH,H_{2}O)_{6.24}. Four alternative and simplified versions include: (1) PbFe_{3}(AsO_{4})_{2}(OH)_{5}·H_{2}O, (2) PbFe_{3}(AsO_{4})_{2}(OH,H_{2}O)_{6}, (3) PbFe_{3}(AsO_{4})(AsO_{3}OH)(OH)_{5}, (4) PbFe_{3}H(AsO_{4})_{2}(OH)_{6}, although the preferred formula is PbFe_{3}H(AsO_{4})_{2}(OH)_{6}, which is most consistent with the space group (R3̅m) for Segnitite.

== Crystal structure and habit ==
Segnitite belongs to the trigonal crystal system, which is also a subcategory of the hexagonal crystal system. Segnitite occurs most commonly as rhombohedral crystals that can grow to around 5mm in height and as pseudo-octahedral crystals that typically measure about 1mm across. The habit of these segnitite clusters is often found to be hemispherical in shape. Rhombohedron {112} and Pinacoid {001} are the two most common forms of segnitite.

== Occurrence ==
Segnitite was first discovered in Broken Hill ore deposit in Broken Hill, New South Wales, Australia. It was first found in the oxidized zone of lead and zinc sulfide ores bodies of the Broken Hill ore deposit and forms in similar settings around the world. Segnitite is a relatively uncommon mineral, and it not found in very large quantities, but is found worldwide in similar areas. Segnitite has since been found in many localities in Western Europe, specifically in sites near Switzerland, Germany and Austria.

Segnitite is commonly found alongside many well known minerals including anglesite, galena, jamesonite, linarite, arsenopyrite, cerussite, covellite, cuprite, sphalerite, sulfur, beudantite, cassiterite, pyrite, smithsonite, carminite and plumbojarosite. Many of these minerals are important ore minerals. Segnitite poses some importance when considering the overall composition of surrounding rock.

== Crystallography ==
Through X-ray diffraction (XRD), which is either conducted through powder diffraction, or through single-crystal X-ray analysis, segnitite was found to belong to the hexagonal crystal system of minerals. Using angles 2θ< 66 degrees, cell parameters were estimated along with chemical composition.

Before segnitite was identified as a mineral, it was commonly mistaken for beudantite. There are close similarities in diffraction data when comparing low sulfate beundantite from the beudantite-corkite group, and segnitite of the lusungnite group. Beundantite, segnitite and plumbojarosite form solid solutions with each other; conditions that form these minerals are similar. The space group R3̅m was determined for segnitite as the best fit based on the space group of beudantite, R3m as there is no well observed crystal structure. The difference between segnitite and beundantite is the replacement of the sulfate anion in beundantite with an arsenate anion to form segnitite.

== Optical properties ==
Segnitite exhibits weak pleochroism from a pale yellow to a more moderate yellow under different angles of plane polarized light, although the effects can be much more dramatic under polarized light. Dichroism and trichroism are both types of pleochroism. The term dichroism is used to describe optical properties of minerals that are uniaxial, including segnitite. Minerals that exhibit dichroism are generally trigonal, hexagonal and tetragonal. A response from UV light was not observed from segnitite.
