= Carminite =

Anhydrous arsenate mineral containing hydroxyl

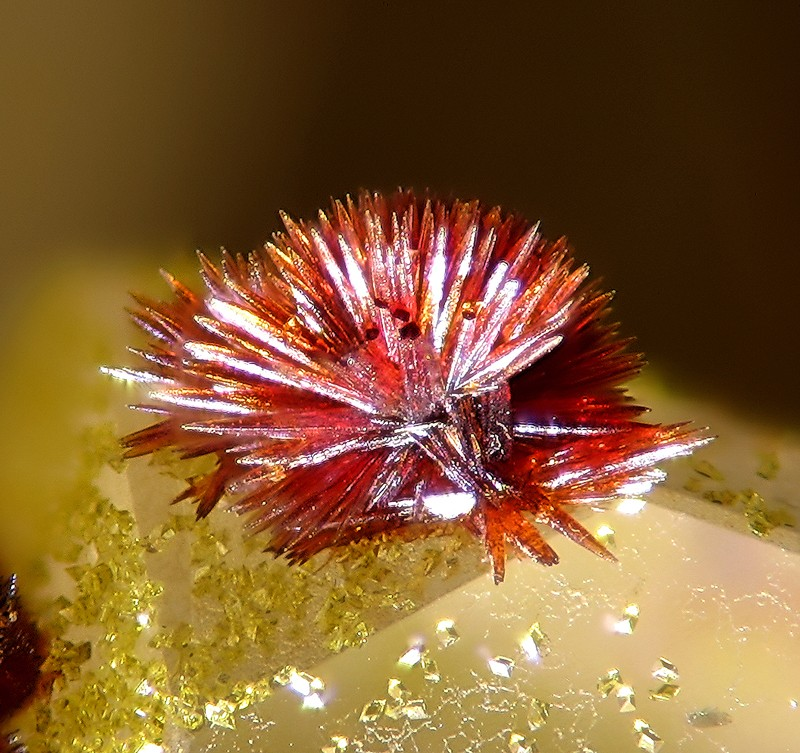
- Carminite from the Alto das Quelhas do Gestoso Mines, Gestoso, Manhouce, São Pedro do Sul, Viseu District, Portugal. Picture width 1.5 mm.

General
- Category: Arsenate minerals
- Formula: PbFe^{3+}_{2}(AsO_{4})_{2}(OH)_{2}
- IMA symbol: Cmt
- Strunz classification: 8.BH.30 (10 ed); 7/B.28-40 (8 ed)
- Dana classification: 41 Anhydrous phosphates, arsenates and vanadates containing hydroxyl or halogen
- Crystal system: Orthorhombic
- Crystal class: Dipyramidal (mmm); H-M symbol: (2/m 2/m 2/m)
- Space group: Cccm
- Unit cell: a = 16.591 Å, b = 7.58 Å, c = 12.285 Å; Z = 8

Identification
- Formula mass: 639.87 g/mol
- Colour: Carmine red
- Crystal habit: Typically bladed crystals, also acicular crystals, in spherical or tufted aggregates and as fibrous or drusy masses
- Cleavage: Distinct on {110}
- Tenacity: Brittle (D, All)
- Mohs scale hardness: 3 1/2
- Lustre: Vitreous, pearly on cleavages
- Streak: Reddish yellow
- Diaphaneity: Translucent
- Specific gravity: 5.03–5.18
- Optical properties: Biaxial (+)
- Refractive index: n_{α} = 2.070, n_{β} = 2.070, n_{γ} = 2.080
- Birefringence: 0.010
- Pleochroism: strong, X= pale yellowish red; Y=Z= dark carmine red
- Solubility: Slowly soluble in HCl with the separation of PbCl_{2}, and totally soluble in HNO_{3}
- Other characteristics: Carminite is not radioactive. No piezoelectric effect could be detected

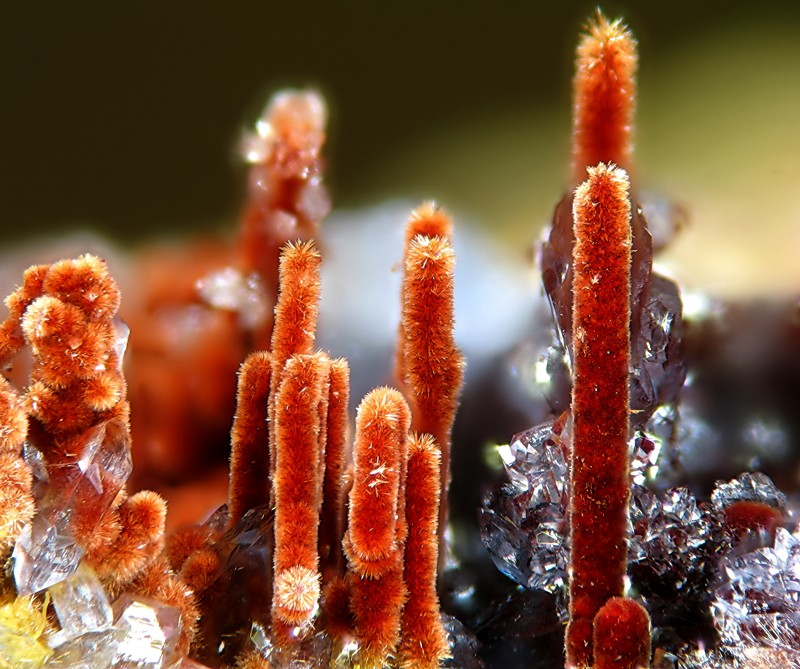
Carminite from the Alto das Quelhas do Gestoso Mines, Gestoso, Manhouce, São Pedro do Sul, Viseu District, Portugal. Picture width 8 mm

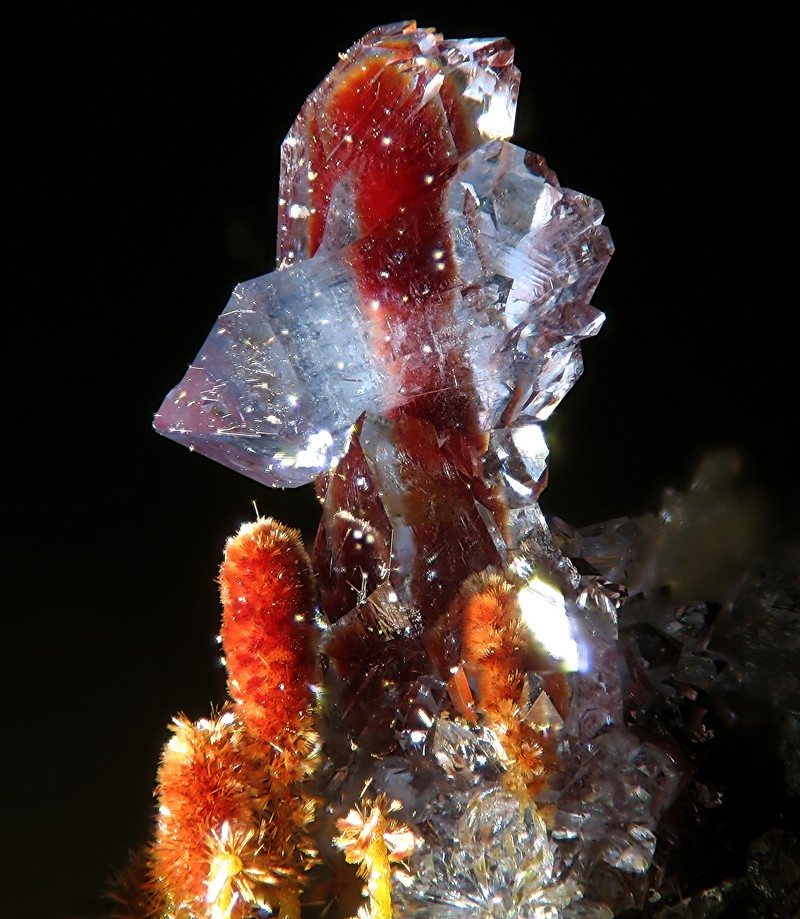
Blue scorodite crystals on red brown carminite from Alto das Quelhas do Gestoso Mines, Gestoso, Manhouce, São Pedro do Sul, Viseu District, Portugal. Picture width 3 mm.

Carminite (PbFe^{3+}_{2}(AsO_{4})_{2}(OH)_{2}) is an anhydrous arsenate mineral containing hydroxyl. It is a rare secondary mineral that is structurally related to palermoite (Li_{2}SrAl_{4}(PO_{4})_{4}(OH)_{4}). Sewardite (CaFe^{3+}_{2}(AsO_{4})_{2}(OH)_{2}) is an analogue of carminite, with calcium in sewardite in place of the lead in carminite. Mawbyite is a dimorph (same formula, different structure) of carminite; mawbyite is monoclinic and carminite is orthorhombic. It has a molar mass of 639.87 g. It was discovered in 1850 and named for the characteristic carmine colour.

== Structure ==
Carminite belongs to the orthorhombic crystal class (2/m 2/m 2/m) and has space group C ccm or C cc2. The structure consists of linked octahedra of iron surrounded by oxygen and hydroxyl which are aligned parallel to the c axis. They are connected together in the direction of the a axis by arsenate tetrahedra (arsenic surrounded by 4 oxygen). Coordination about the lead atoms is eight-fold. The edges of the unit cell have lengths a = 16.59 Å, b = 7.58 Å and c = 12.295 Å. There are 8 formula units in each unit cell (Z = 8).

== Appearance ==
Crystals have been found up to 2 cm long, though most are smaller. They are typically bladed, elongated along the c axis and flattened perpendicular to the b axis. They also occur as acicular crystals, in spherical or tufted aggregates and as fibrous or drusy masses. The crystals are a characteristic carmine red colour, hence the name, and they are also red in transmitted light. They are translucent with a vitreous lustre and a reddish yellow streak.

== Physical properties ==
Carminite is fairly soft, with a Mohs hardness of 3 1/2, between that of calcite and fluorite. Because of the lead content it is heavy, with specific gravity of 5.03 – 5.18, although specimens from Mapimi are less dense at 4.10. Cleavage is distinct in one direction parallel to the c axis. The mineral is slowly soluble in hydrochloric acid (HCl) with the separation of lead(II) chloride (PbCl_{2}) and totally soluble in nitric acid (HNO_{3}). Carminite is not radioactive and no piezoelectric effect has been detected.

== Optical properties ==
Orthorhombic crystals (and monoclinic and triclinic crystals) have two directions in which light travels with zero birefringence; these directions are called the optic axes, and the crystal is said to be biaxial. The speed of a ray of light travelling through the crystal differs with direction. The direction of the fastest ray is called the X direction and the direction of the slowest ray is called the Z direction. X and Z are perpendicular to each other and a third direction Y is defined as perpendicular to both X and Z; light travelling along Y has an intermediate speed. Refractive index is inversely proportional to speed, so the refractive indices for the X, Y and Z directions increase from X to Z.

Carminite is crystal axes a, b and c, but not necessarily in that order. For carminite the orientation is X = c, Y = a and Z = b and the refractive indices are high, with n_{α} = 2.070, n_{β} = 2.070, n_{γ} = 2.080, only a little less than diamond at 2.4.

The maximum birefringence δ is the difference between the highest and lowest refractive index; for carminite δ = 0.010.
The angle between the two optic axes is called the optic angle, 2V, and it is always acute, and bisected either by X or by Z. If Z is the bisector then the crystal is said to be positive, and if X is the bisector it is said to be negative. Carminite is biaxial (+) and 2V is moderate to large. 2V depends on the refractive indices, but refractive index varies with wavelength, and hence with colour. So 2V also depends on the colour, and is different for red and for violet light. This effect is called dispersion of the optic axes, or just dispersion (not to be confused with chromatic dispersion). If 2V is greater for red light than for violet light the dispersion is designated r > v, and vice versa. For carminite the dispersion is strong, with r < v.
The mineral exhibits strong pleochroism; when viewed along the X direction it appears pale yellowish red and dark carmine red along the Y and Z directions. Absorption is equal along the Y and Z optic directions, but less along the X optic direction.
When a birefringent crystal is rotated between crossed polarizers it will turn dark every 90° of rotation. This effect is known as extinction. Carminite exhibits the parallel extinction that is characteristic of orthorhombic crystals.

== Occurrence ==
Carminite is formed as an uncommon alteration product of arsenopyrite (FeAsS) in the oxidized zones of some lead-bearing deposits. Common associates are wulfenite, scorodite, plumbojarosite, mimetite, dussertite, cerussite, beudantite, bayldonite, arseniosiderite and anglesite.

The type locality is the Louise Mine, Bürdenbach, Altenkirchen, Wied Iron Spar District, Westerwald, Rhineland-Palatinate, Germany where it is associated with beudantite. At the Hingston Down Consols mine in Cornwall, England, carminite occurs with scorodite, mimetite and pharmacosiderite.

The ores of the Ojuela Mine, Mexico, are replacement deposits in limestone and consist of galena, sphalerite, pyrite, and arsenopyrite in a matrix of quartz, dolomite and fluorite. Arsenopyrite is abundant. On a dump near the north shaft blocks of massive scorodite containing seams and pockets of arseniosiderite and small areas of dussertite and carminite have been found. Carminite also occurs as masses mixed with cerussite, anglesite and plumbojarosite. It is almost always intimately associated with arseniosiderite and dussertite.
