= Miriquidi =

Historic forest in Saxony

Miriquidi is a medieval name for a forest, perhaps in the vicinity of the Ore Mountains, between the Elbe and Saale rivers.

The name occurs in the Norse form Myrkviðr ('dark wood') in the Edda story Lokasenna, and in Hervarar saga ok Heiðreks it is the name of the forest separating the Ostrogoths from the Huns. A forest called Miriquido (Latin: silva que Miriquido dicitur) appears in a charter of Emperor Otto II of 30 August 974; in it he gives the forest to a church in Merseburg within certain limits between the rivers Saale and Mulde, but the exact location is not given. The name also appears in the Chronicle (1012–1018) of Thietmar of Merseburg (in silva, quae Miriquidui dicitur), but again without any details of location. Towards the end of the nineteenth century, the term Miriquidi was supposed by some historians to have been used for the primeval forest covering the Ore Mountains, and it continues to be used in this sense in local history publications and chronicles. In 1874, the geologist Friedrich August Frenzel named a mineral miriquidite after this forest name (it is not clear which; it may be beudantite or corkite). More recently, it has been suggested that it is the Černý les ('black forest') of the Chernyakhov culture.
