= Arsenite bromides =

Compounds with arsenate and bromide ions

The arsenite bromides are mixed anion compounds containing both arsenite and bromide ions. Similar compounds include arsenate bromides, arsenite chlorides, antimonite bromides, antimonite chlorides, and ...

They are in the category of halide oxidoarsenates(III)

== List ==
	chem	mw	crystal system	space group	unit cell Å	volume	density	comment	references
Ermakovite	(NH_{4})(As_{2}O_{3})_{2}Br		hexagonal	P6/mmm	a = 5.271 c = 9.157 Z = 1	220.3	3.64	uniaxial (–), ω = 1.960 ɛ = 1.716 at 589 nm	
	In_{4}(As_{2}O_{5})(As_{3}O_{7})Br_{3}		triclinic	P1̅	a=7.998 b=10.532 c=11.952 α=70.92° β=79.62° γ=80.27° Z=2	928	4.527	stable to 530°C	
	La_{3}OBr[AsO_{3}]_{2}		tetragonal	P4_{2}/mnm	a = 13.043 c = 5.6127 Z=4	954.8	5.27	colourless	
	Ce_{3}OBr[AsO_{3}]_{2}								
	Nd_{3}OBr[AsO_{3}]_{2}								
	Sm_{3}OBr[AsO_{3}]_{2}								
	Gd_{3}OBr[AsO_{3}]_{2}								
	Tb_{3}OBr[AsO_{3}]_{2}								
	Tm_{3}Br_{2}[As_{2}O_{5}][AsO_{3}]		triclinic	P1̅	a = 5.3496 b = 8.6926 c = 10.8184 α = 90.723° β = 94.792° γ = 90.119° Z=2		6.760	pale yellow	
Beudantite	PbFe_{3}(OH)_{6}SO_{4}AsO_{4}		trigonal	R3̅m	a = 7.32, c = 17.02 Z=3	789.79	4.48	Uniaxial (-) n_{ω} = 1.957 n_{ε} = 1.943 Birefringence: 0.014	
Gallobeudantite	PbGa_{3}(AsO_{4})(SO_{4})(OH)_{6}		trigonal	R3m	a = 7.225, c = 17.03 Z=3	769.88	4.87	uniaxial (–) n_{ω} = 1.763 n_{ε} = 1.750	
