= Hidalgoite =

Mineral of the beudantite group

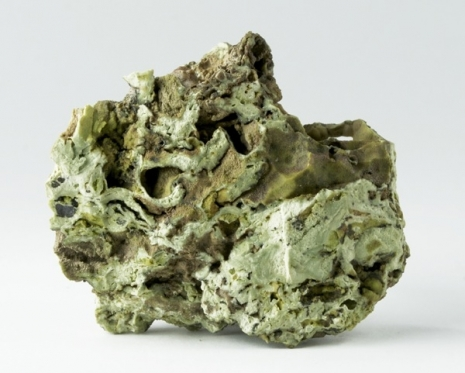
- Hidalgoite from a mine in Utah

General
- Category: Sulfate mineral
- Formula: PbAl_{3}(AsO_{4})(SO_{4})(OH)_{4}
- IMA symbol: Hid
- Strunz classification: 8.BL.05
- Crystal system: Trigonal
- Crystal class: Hexagonal scalenohedral (3̅m); H-M symbol: (3̅ 2/m)
- Space group: R3̅m
- Unit cell: a = 7.04, c = 16.99 [Å]; Z = 3

Identification
- Color: White, pale green, pistachio-green, emerald-green
- Crystal habit: Massive, porcellaneous to porous; spherulitic aggregates
- Fracture: Irregular to conchoidal
- Tenacity: Brittle
- Mohs scale hardness: 4.5
- Luster: Earthy or dull in aggregates
- Streak: White
- Diaphaneity: Translucent
- Specific gravity: 3.71–3.96
- Optical properties: Uniaxial (+)
- Refractive index: n_{ω} = 1.713–1.730 n_{ε} = 1.715–1.735

Hidalgoite, PbAl_{3}(AsO_{4})(SO_{4})(OH)_{4}, is a rare member of the beudantite group and is usually classified as part of the alunite family. It was named after the place where it was first discovered, the Zimapán mining district, Hidalgo, Mexico. At Hidalgo where it was initially discovered, it was found as dense white masses in alternating dikes of quartz latite and quartz monzonite alongside other secondary minerals such as sphalerite, arsenopyrite, cerussite and trace amounts of angelsite and alamosite, it was then rediscovered at other locations such as Australia where it occurs on oxidized shear zones above greywacke shales especially on the anticline prospects of the area, and on fine grained quartz-spessartine rocks in Broken Hill, Australia. Hidalgoite specimens are usually associated with copper minerals, clay minerals, iron oxides and polymetallic sulfides in occurrence.

Hidalgoite is categorized under the trigonal crystal system and R3̅m space group and can be denoted by the H-M symbol (3̅2/m). Physical properties of hidalgoite include its gray white to light gray color, a white streak, specific gravity of 3.96 and a hardness of 4.5. Hidalgoite specimens are usually translucent to sub opaque, and the brittle nature of mineral produces conchoidal fractures. It has an earthy luster.

== Composition ==
Hidalgoite was collected from a quartz vein at the Zimapán mining area after which it was examined by Smith in the laboratories. Hidalgoite structure departs from the other beaudantite group members in the ion substitutions; lead is substituted for zinc, iron for aluminium and antimony for arsenic and these substitutions account for the presence of some ions in the chemical analysis for the specimen. Other chemical analyses that were conducted on the hidalgoite specimen include determination of the sulfide using qualitative analysis in which zinc was precipitated as the sulfide and was then ignited to the oxide, iron content (Fe_{2}O_{3}) was determined colorimetrically with KCNS and water content which is only slightly expressed in the structure was determined by the Penfield method using anhydrous sodium tungstate as a flux. The specific gravity of hidalgoite was determined as 3.96 using Adam-Johnston fused silica pycnometer. Hidalgoite specimens also contained some limonitic impurities which according to Smith accounts for the excess water in the structure. Qualitative spectrographic analysis of hidalgoite specimen showed the presence of metallic cations such as Ca, V, Ti and Cu in very minute quantities and Mg, Sr, Ba, B, Cr and Sc in even smaller quantities.

== Structure ==
The structure of Hidalgoite is a complex structure consisting of a monovalent cation, a tri valent cation and two almost equal anion groups. The hidalgoite structure is different from other members of the beaudantite in that, in the other beaudantite group minerals, the oxygen and the hydroxyl bind to the sulfate group along the chain whereas, in hidalgoite, the hydroxyl and oxygen bond to the sulfate group but the hydrogen is also bonded with the arsenate anion. The hidalgoite structure has cation preference on all three sites, Pb being the preferred monovalent site, Fe for the trivalent cation site, and arsenic and phosphate for the anion site. The structure shows no ordering between the arsenate group and the phosphate group. According to the alunite family structure, a super group of hidalgoite is made up of octahedral layers that touch at the corners, on top and bottom of the octahedral layers are tetrahedra that connect to one another by sharing three of their apices with the octahedra. The unbounded apex areas are usually bonded to by oxygen atoms or hydroxyl atoms and the layers are held together by the lead cations. The hydrogen atoms bond to the corners of the octahedral that are not being occupied.

== Physical properties ==
Hidalgoite is usually seen as light gray to dark gray colors but other variety of colors are seen to include rich shades of green, some dark reds and very rarely yellow. Hidalgoite minerals are characterized with a white streak and possess a dull and earthy luster. Beaudantite group members show good cleavage on {001}. Hidalgoite specimens have irregular fractures and due to its brittle nature breaks conchoidally. The hardness of the mineral is 4.5 and the density ranges from 3.96g/cm3 to 4.5g/cm3 due to impurities from associated minerals.

== Geologic occurrence ==
The occurrences of hidalgoite have been seen across many continents from South America to Africa. It was initially discovered between large bodies of quartz dike as a white porous substance alongside other sulfates but has since been seen in other parts of the world. In Nye County, Nevada, hidalgoite is seen as clear prismatic crystals with other secondary lead minerals such as mimetite and beaudantite. In certain parts of Australia, hidalgoite is found between distorted sedimentary layers of shale and greywack, it is mostly found in uplifted layers of rocks. A special type of hidalgoite called phillipsbornite-hidalgoite was discovered at Tsumeb, Namibia as bladed yellow-green masses dotted with azurite crystals in large quartz matrix. In Broken Hill, Australia, hidalgoite minerals are found in large quantities according to unidentified sources, this could be as a result of contamination of groundwater with oxygen which causes the sulfide ores to dissolve and recrystallize forming new secondary minerals. Other places where hidalgoite can be seen are Spain, France and England.
