= MBY =

MBY, Mby or mby can refer to:

- Memoni language, a language spoken in Gujarat state, India, by ISO 639 code
- Malaybalay Airport, a now-defunct airport near Malaybalay, the Philippines, by former IATA code
- Mandi Dabwali railway station, a train station in Hisar district, Haryana state, India; see List of railway stations in Haryana
- Mawbyite, a brownish-red mineral containing lead, arsenic, and iron, by International Mineralogical Association symbol
- Omar N. Bradley Airport, an airport in Moberly, Missouri, U.S.; see List of airports in Missouri
- Middlebury station, a train station in Middlebury, Vermont, U.S.
- Maryborough railway station, Victoria, a train station in Mayborough, Victoria, Australia
