= Iron cap =

Iron cap may refer to:

- Gossan - geological formation
- Iron Dome - missile defense system
- Iron-cap princes (铁帽子王) noble rank of the Aisin Gioro, founders of the Qing dynasty
