= Friedrich August Frenzel =

German mineralogist (1842–1902)

Friedrich August Frenzel (24 May 1842 – 27 August 1902) was a German mineralogist. He was born in a miner's family in Freiberg, Saxony. In 1861 he was awarded a scholarship which enabled him to study mineralogy at Bergakademie Freiberg. There he attracted the attention of August Breithaupt who asked him to help with organising the mineralogical collections of the academy and with testing mineral samples, and to assist in the professor's mineralogical research. In 1865 Frenzel finished his studies and was awarded the title of a mining inspector. From then on, he worked for 25 years as a chemist in the metallurgical laboratories. He also lectured at the Bergakademie.

One of his best known works is the mineralogical encyclopedia for the Kingdom of Saxony (Mineralogisches Lexicon Für Das Königreich Sachsen), which contains descriptions of 723 minerals found in Saxony, information on their physical properties and chemical compositions, and descriptions of the corresponding localities.

He died in Freiberg.

== Works ==
- Mineralogisches Lexicon Für Das Königreich Sachsen
- together with G. vom Rath: Über merkwürdige Verwachsungen von Quarzkrystallen auf Kalkspath von Schneeberg in Sachsen
- together with Heinrich Moehl, Hanns Bruno Geinitz, Oskar Schneider: X. Kaukasische Mineralien
- Leitfaden für den Unterricht in der Mineralogie an der Königlichen Bergschule zu Freiberg
- together with D. Köck: Leitfaden für den Unterricht in der Mineralogie an den Sächsischen Bergschulen zu Freiberg und Zwickau

== Minerals first described by F. A. Frenzel ==
- 1870: Lithiophorite
- 1871: Pucherite und Bismutoferrite (as Hypochlorit)
- 1872: Heterogenite (Heterogenit-3R) und Miriquidite
- 1881: Lautite
- 1883: Rézbányit (also Rezbanyit, discredited in 1994, found to be a mixture of hammarite, krupkaite und cosalite)
- 1887: Hohmannite
- 1888: Amarantite
- 1893: Cylindrite
