= Corkite =

Phosphate mineral

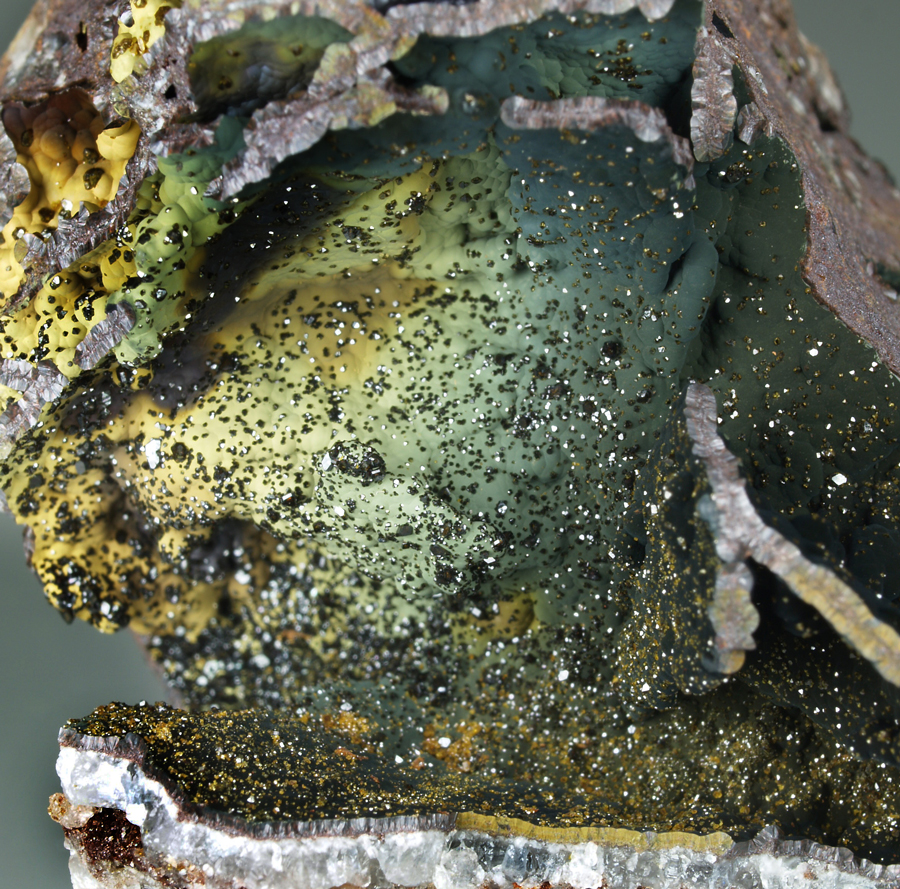
- Corkite on a goethite matrix

General
- Category: Phosphate minerals
- Formula: PbFe_{3}[(OH)_{6}:SO_{4}:PO_{4}]
- IMA symbol: Cok
- Strunz classification: 8.BL.05
- Dana classification: 43.4.1.2
- Crystal system: Trigonal
- Crystal class: Ditrigonal pyramidal (3/m) (same H-M symbol)
- Space group: R3m
- Unit cell: a = 7.3065(5) Å, c = 16.897(2) Å; V = 781.2 Å³; Z = 3

Identification
- Formula mass: 667.82 g/mol
- Color: Brown to light yellowish brown, pale yellow, yellowish green to dark green
- Crystal habit: Crystals pseudocubic rhombohedral with prominent {101̅1}. Commonly in crusts and massive
- Cleavage: Perfect on {0001}
- Mohs scale hardness: 3.5–4.5
- Luster: Vitreous, resinous
- Diaphaneity: transparent
- Specific gravity: 4.295 (measured), 4.31 (calculated)
- Optical properties: Uniaxial (−), may appear anomalously biaxial
- Refractive index: n_{ω} = 1.930 n_{ε} = 1.930 n = 1.93 – 1.96
- Birefringence: δ = 0.000
- Other characteristics: Readily soluble in warm HCl

Corkite is a phosphate mineral in the beudantite subgroup of the alunite group. Corkite is the phosphate analogue of beudantite and with it, a complete solid solution range exists. Corkite will also form a solid solution with kintoreite.

Corkite is named after County Cork, Ireland; the location where the first notable amount was discovered in 1869. Like many of the other minerals in the beudantite group, corkite is a relatively uncommon, secondary mineral that occurs in oxidation zones near hydrothermal base metal deposits. It occurs associated with pyromorphite, malachite, plumbojarosite, limonite and quartz.
