= Penberthy Croft Mine =

Disused mine in Cornwall, England

Coordinates: 50.1414°N 5.4269°W

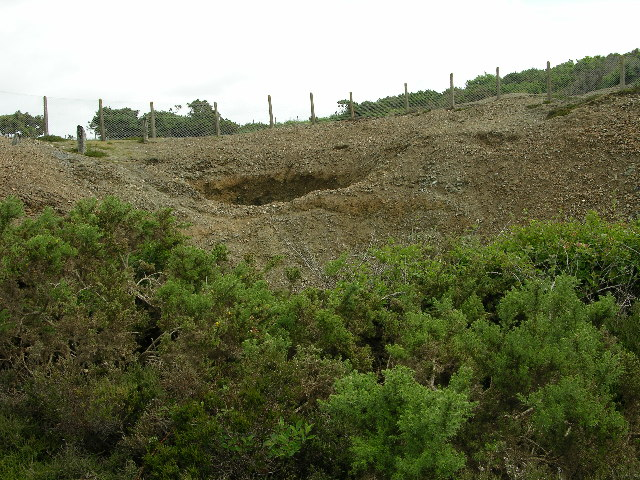
Penberthy Croft Mine shaft

Penberthy Croft Mine, is a disused mine and Site of Special Scientific Interest (SSSI) in Cornwall, England, UK. It is located to the north of the civil parish of St Hilary, 5 miles (8.0 km) east of the town of Penzance.

The mine was designated a SSSI in 1993, is listed as of national importance in the Geological Conservation Review and is the world type locality for bayldonite. It is noted as the most important site in Britain for secondary ore minerals of lead, copper, and arsenic and has had 40 mineral species recorded at the site.

== History ==
A new 36-inch cylinder pumping engine was built in 1880, by Messrs George Eustice and Cooper which drained between nine and ten fathoms of water in the first four hours of work.
