= Light of the Desert =

898-carat cerussite gem in the Royal Ontario Museum's collection, from Tsumeb, Namibia

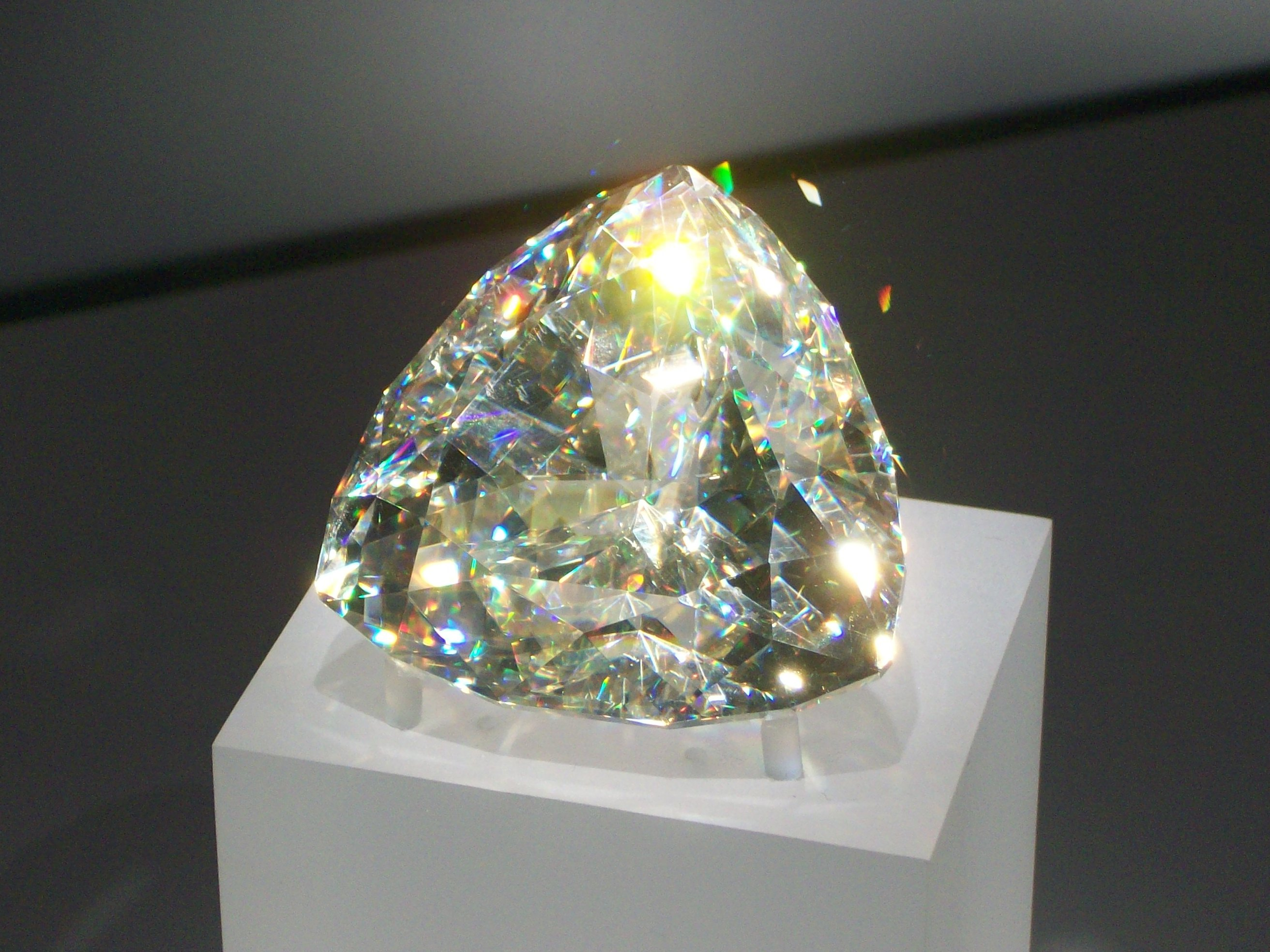
- Type of stone: Cerussite
- Weight: 898 carats (179.6 g)
- Country of origin: Namibia
- Owner: Royal Ontario Museum

The Light of the Desert is the world’s largest faceted cerussite gem, weighing 898 carats (179.6 g). It is currently part of Toronto's Royal Ontario Museum (ROM) collection.

The raw cerussite was discovered in Tsumeb in northern Namibia. It was then acquired by David Atkinson of Terra and Maria Atkinson, who faceted the raw material into the gem on display. Cerussite is extremely fragile and sensitive to temperature changes and vibration; cutting and transporting the gem cause significant problems. After it was cut in Arizona, the gem was placed in a box, wrapped in a large woolen scarf and a winter vest, and then hand transported to Toronto for display. Cerussite is too fragile to be set in jewelry.
