= François Sulpice Beudant =

French mineralogist and geologist (1787–1850)

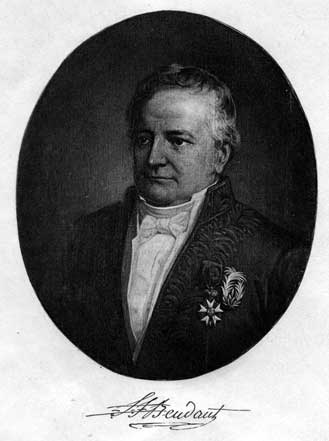
François Sulpice Beudant.

François Sulpice Beudant (5 September 1787 – 10 December 1850) was a French mineralogist and geologist. The mineral beudantite was named after him.

== Life ==
Born in Paris, he was educated at the Ecole Polytechnique and Ecole Normale, and in 1811 was appointed professor of mathematics at the lycée of Avignon. Thence he was called, in 1813, to the lycée of Marseille to fill the post of professor of physics, where he carried out the first measurements of the speed of sound in seawater. In the following year the royal mineralogical cabinet was committed to his charge to be conveyed into England, and from that time his attention was directed principally towards geology and cognate sciences.

In 1817, he published a paper on the phenomena of crystallization, treating especially of the variety of forms assumed by the same mineral substance. In 1818 he undertook, at the expense of the French government, a geological journey through Hungary, and the results of his researches, Voyage minéralogique et géologique en Hongrie, 3 vols 4to, with atlas, published in 1822, established for him a European reputation.

In 1820, he was appointed to the professorship of mineralogy in the Paris faculty of sciences, and afterwards became inspector-general of the university. He subsequently published treatises on physics and on mineralogy and geology. Perhaps his most notable publication is the second edition of Traite Elementaire de Mineralogie (Paris, 1830–1832), the second volume of which deals with descriptive mineralogy and in which Beudant coined the names of many minerals, such as anglesite, bismuthite and cerussite. The mineral beudantite was named for him.

== Works ==
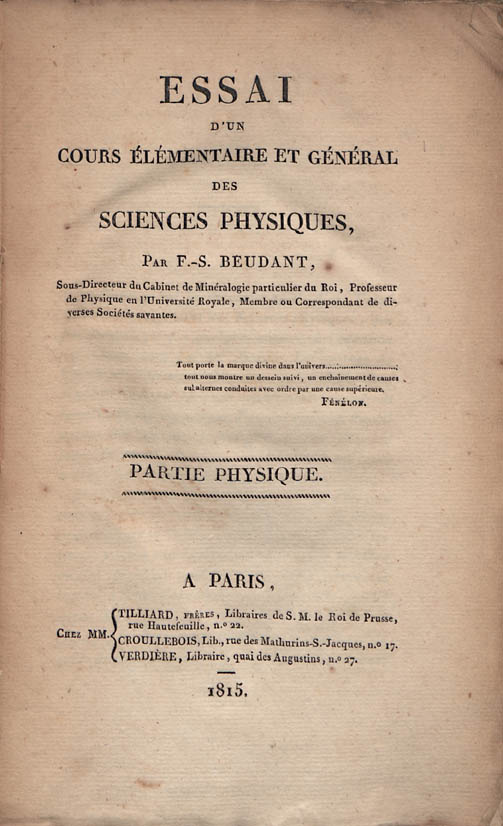
Essai d'un cours élémentaire et général des sciences physiques, 1815

- Essai d'un cours élémentaire et général des sciences physiques (in French). Paris: Tilliard. 1815.
