= Jarosite =

Alunite supergroup, potassium iron basic sulfate mineral

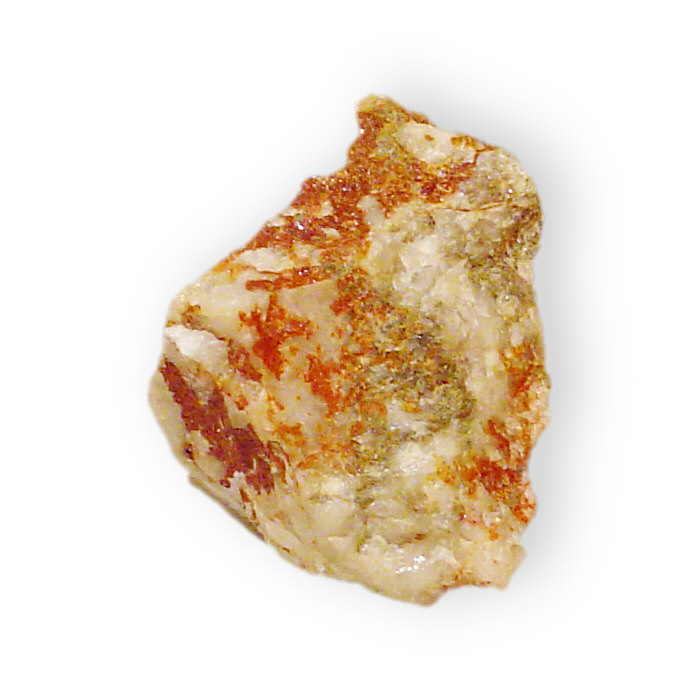
- Jarosite on quartz from the Arabia District, Pershing County, Nevada

General
- Category: Sulfate minerals
- Formula: KFe_{3}(SO_{4})_{2}(OH)_{6}
- IMA symbol: Jrs
- Strunz classification: 7.BC.10
- Dana classification: 30.2.5.1
- Crystal system: Trigonal
- Crystal class: Rhombohedral (3̅m); H-M symbol: (3̅m)
- Space group: R3̅m
- Unit cell: a = 7.304 Å, c = 17.268 Å; Z = 3

Identification
- Formula mass: 500.8 g/mol
- Color: Amber yellow or dark brown
- Crystal habit: Crystals are usually pseudocubic or tabular, also as granular crusts, nodules, fibrous masses or concretionary.
- Cleavage: Distinct on {0001}
- Fracture: Uneven to conchoidal
- Tenacity: Brittle
- Mohs scale hardness: 2.5–3.5
- Luster: Subadamantine to vitreous, resinous on fractures
- Streak: light yellow
- Diaphaneity: Transparent to translucent
- Specific gravity: 2.9 to 3.3
- Optical properties: Uniaxial (−), usually anomalously biaxial with very small 2V
- Refractive index: n_{ω} = 1.815 to 1.820; n_{ε} = 1.713 to 1.715
- Birefringence: 0.102 to 0.105
- Pleochroism: E colorless, very pale yellow, or pale greenish yellow, O deep golden yellow or reddish brown
- Solubility: Insoluble in water. Soluble in HCl.
- Other characteristics: Strongly pyroelectric. Non-fluorescent. Barely detectable radioactivity

Jarosite is a basic hydrous sulfate of potassium and ferric iron (Fe-III) with a chemical formula of KFe_{3}(SO_{4})_{2}(OH)_{6}. This sulfate mineral is formed in ore deposits by the oxidation of iron sulfides. Jarosite is often produced as a byproduct during the purification and refining of zinc and is also commonly associated with acid mine drainage and acid sulfate soil environments.

== Physical properties ==
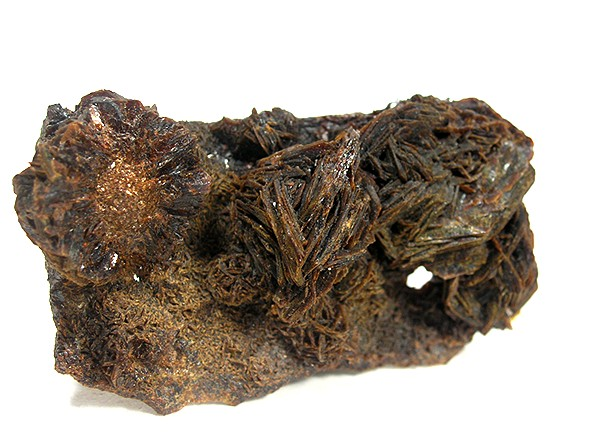
Jarosite crystals from Sierra Peña Blanca, Aldama, Chihuahua, Mexico (5.6 × 3.1 × 1.6 cm)

Jarosite has a trigonal crystal structure and is brittle, with basal cleavage, a hardness of 2.5–3.5, and a specific gravity of 3.15–3.26. It is translucent to opaque with a vitreous to dull luster, and is colored dark yellow to yellowish-brown. It can sometimes be confused with limonite or goethite with which it commonly occurs in the gossan (oxidized cap over an ore body). Jarosite is an iron analogue of the potassium aluminium sulfate, alunite.

== Solid solution series ==
The alunite supergroup includes the alunite, jarosite, beudantite, crandallite and florencite subgroups. The alunite supergroup minerals are isostructural with each other and substitution between them occurs, resulting in several solid solution series. The alunite supergroup has the general formula AB_{3}(TO_{4})_{2}(OH)_{6}. In the alunite subgroup B is Al, and in the jarosite subgroup B is Fe^{3+}. The beudantite subgroup has the general formula AB_{3}(XO_{4})(SO_{4})(OH)_{6}, the crandallite subgroup AB_{3}(TO_{4})_{2}(OH)_{5}•H_{2}O and the florencite subgroup AB_{3}(TO_{4})_{2}(OH)_{5 or 6}.

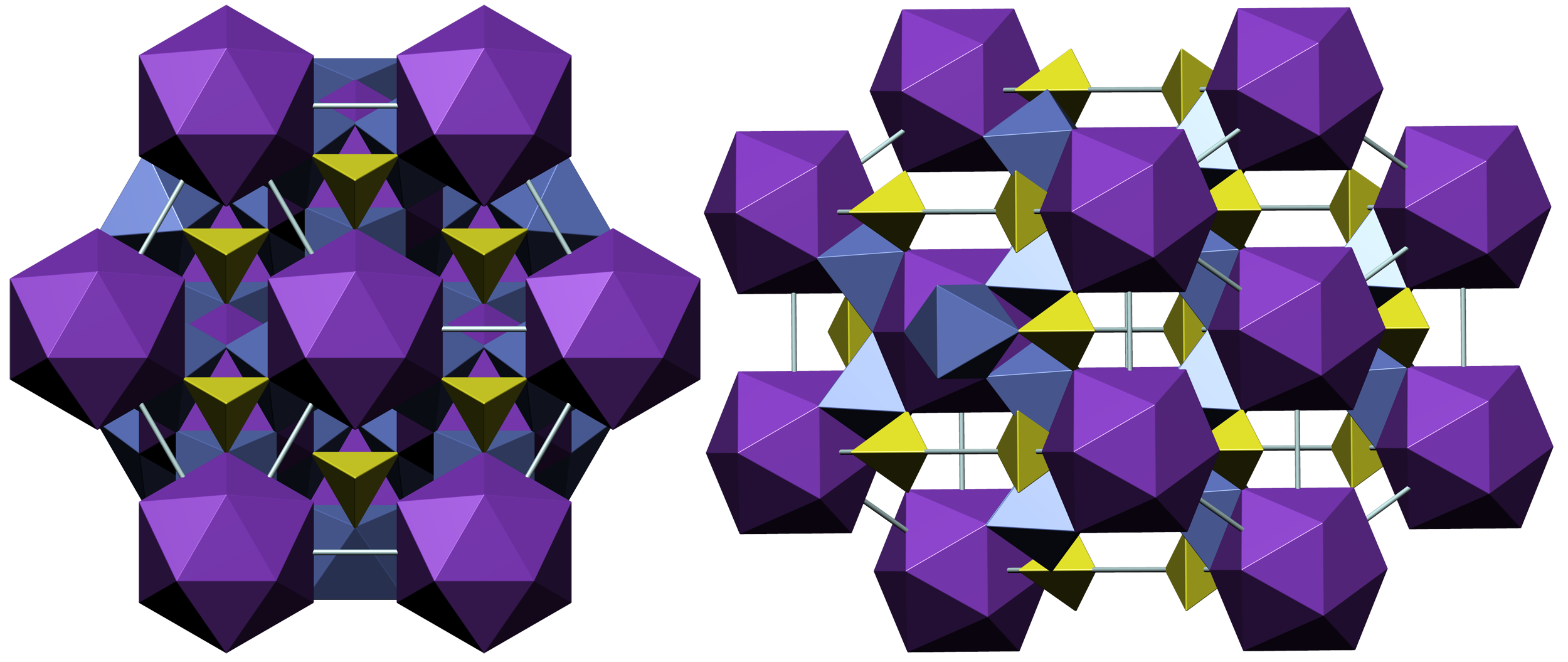
Crystal structure of jarosite Color code: Potassium, K: purple; Sulfur, S: olive; Iron, Fe: violet-blue; Cell: sky-blue.

In the jarosite-alunite series Al may substitute for Fe and a complete solid solution series between jarosite and alunite, KAl_{3}(SO_{4})_{2}(OH)_{6}, probably exists, but intermediate members are rare. The material from Kopec, Czech Republic, has about equal Fe and Al, but the amount of Al in jarosite is usually small.

When jarosite forms from pyrite oxidation in sedimentary clays, the main sources of K^{+} are illite, a non-swelling clay, or K-feldspar. In other geological settings mica's alteration can also be a source of potassium.

In the jarosite-natrojarosite series Na substitutes for K to at least Na/K = 1:2.4 but the pure sodium end member NaFe_{3}(SO_{4})_{2}(OH)_{6} is not known in nature. Minerals with Na > K are known as natrojarosite. End member formation (jarosite and natrojarosite) is favoured by a low temperature environment, less than 100 °C, and is illustrated by the oscillatory zoning of jarosite and natrojarosite found in samples from the Apex Mine, Arizona, and Gold Hill, Utah. This indicates that there is a wide miscibility gap between the two end members, and it is doubtful whether a complete series exists between jarosite and natrojarosite.

In hydroniumjarosite the hydronium ion H_{3}O^{+} can also substitute for K^{+}, with increased hydronium ion content causing a marked decrease in the lattice parameter c, although there is little change in a. Hydroniumjarosite will only form from alkali-deficient solutions, as alkali-rich jarosite forms preferentially.

Divalent cations may also substitute for the monovalent cation K^{+} in the A site. Charge balance may be achieved in three ways.

Firstly by replacing two monovalent cations by one divalent cation, and leaving an A site vacancy, as in plumbogummite, Pb^{2+}Al_{3}(PO_{4})_{2}(OH)_{5}.H_{2}O, which is a member of the crandallite subgroup.
Secondly by incorporating divalent ions in the B sites, as in osarizawaite, Pb^{2+}Cu^{2+}Al_{2}(SO_{4})_{2}(OH)_{6}, alunite subgroup, and beaverite, Pb^{2+}Cu^{2+}(Fe^{3+},Al)_{2}(SO_{4})_{2}(OH)_{6}, jarosite subgroup.
Thirdly by replacing divalent anions with trivalent anions, as in beudantite, PbFe^{3+}_{3}(AsO_{4})^{3−}(SO_{4})(OH)_{6}, beudantite subgroup.

== History ==
Jarosite was first described in 1852 by August Breithaupt in the Barranco del Jaroso in the Sierra Almagrera (near Los Lobos, Cuevas del Almanzora, Almería, Spain). The name jarosite is directly derived from "jara", the Spanish name of a yellow flower that belongs to the genus Cistus and grows in the sierra. The mineral and the flower have the same color.

Mysterious spheres of clay, 1.5 to 5 inches (40 to 125 mm) in diameter and covered with jarosite, have been found beneath the Temple of the Feathered Serpent, an ancient six-level stepped pyramid 30 miles (50 km) from Mexico City.

=== Mars exploration ===
Ferric sulfate and jarosite have been detected by three martian rovers: Spirit, Opportunity and Curiosity. These substances are indicative of strongly oxidizing conditions prevailing at the surface of Mars. In May 2009, the Spirit rover became stuck when it drove over a patch of soft ferric sulfate that had been hidden under a veneer of normal-looking soil. Because iron sulfate has very little cohesion, the rover's wheels could not gain sufficient traction to pull the body of the rover out of the iron sulfate patch. Multiple techniques were attempted to extricate the rover, but the wheels eventually sank so deeply into the iron sulfate that the body of the rover came to rest on the Martian surface, preventing the wheels from exerting any force on the material below them. As the JPL team failed to recover the mobility of Spirit, it signified the end of the journey for the rover.

=== Antarctica deep borehole ===
On Earth, jarosite is mainly associated with the ultimate stage of pyrite oxidation in clay environment, and can also be found in mine tailings waste where acidic conditions prevail. Against all expectations, jarosite has also been fortuitously discovered in minute quantities in the form of small dust particles in ice cores recovered from a deep borehole in Antarctica. That surprising discovery was made by geologists who were searching for specific minerals capable of indicating ice age cycles within the layers of a 1620-meter-long ice core. Geologists speculate that jarosite dust could also have accumulated within ice in glaciers on Mars. However, that hypothesis is a matter of controversy because, on Mars, jarosite deposits can be very thick (up to 10 meters). However, Mars is also a very dusty planet and, in the absence of plate tectonics on Mars, glacial dust deposits might have accumulated over long periods of time.

== Use in materials science ==
Jarosite is also a more generic term denoting an extensive family of compounds of the form AM_{3}(OH)_{6}(SO_{4})_{2}, where A^{+} = Na, K, Rb, NH_{4}, H_{3}O, Ag, Tl and M^{3+} = Fe, Cr, V. In condensed matter physics and materials science they are renowned for containing layers with kagome lattice structure, relating to geometrically frustrated magnets.

== See also ==
- Alunite
- Iron(III) sulfate
- Spirit Mars rover final embedding event
