= Gallobeudantite =

Arsenate mineral

General
- Category: Arsenate minerals
- Formula: PbGa_{3}(AsO_{4})(SO_{4})(OH)_{6}
- Crystal class: 3m - Ditrigonal Pyramidal
- Unit cell: a = 7.225(4) Å, c = 17.03(2) Å

Identification
- Color: Pale yellow, greenish, or cream-colored
- Crystal habit: Trigonal
- Cleavage: Distinct/Good
- Fracture: Conchoidal
- Tenacity: Brittle
- Luster: Vitreous
- Streak: pale yellow, white
- Specific gravity: 4.87 (calculated)
- Other characteristics: Non-radioactive.

Gallobeudantite is a secondary, Gallium-bearing mineral of beudantite, where the Iron is replaced with Gallium, a rare-earth metal. It was first described as a distinct mineral by Jambor et al in 1996. Specific Gallium minerals are generally rare and Gallium itself is usually obtained as a by-product during the processing of the ores of other metals. In particular, the main source material for Gallium is bauxite, a key ore of aluminium. However, Gallobeudantite is too rare to be of economic value. Its main interest is academic and also among mineral collectors.

Jambor et al. describes Gallobeudantite as having occurred as zoned rhombohedra, up to 200 μm along an edge, in vugs in a single specimen of massive Cu-bearing sulfides from Tsumeb, Namibia. Gallobeudantite can be pale yellow, greenish, or cream-colored and has a white to pale yellow streak. It has a vitreous luster.

Since the discovery of Gallobeudantite, there has been renewed interest in this class of mineral, particularly in the famous Apex deposit in Utah and additional studies on the crystal structure of Ga-rich plumbogummite from Tsumeb

The mineral has only been found so far in the Namibian Tsumeb Mine, located in the Oshikoto Region. The mineral is a mixture of three elements Gallium, Arsenic and Lead with the formula $\ce{PbGa3 [(AsO4),(SO4)]2 (OH)6}$.
