= Vasilseverginite =

Arsenate-sulfate mineral

General
- Category: Arsenate mineral
- Formula: Cu_{9}O_{4}(AsO_{4})_{2}(SO_{4})_{2}
- IMA symbol: Vas
- Crystal system: Monoclinic
- Crystal class: Prismatic (2/m) (same H-M symbol)
- Space group: P2_{1}/m
- Unit cell: a = 8.113(4) Å b = 9.918(4) Å c = 11.0225(5) Å; β = 110.86° (approximated)

Identification

Vasilseverginite is a very rare arsenate-sulfate mineral with formula Cu_{9}O_{4}(AsO_{4})_{2}(SO_{4})_{2}. Its structure is of a new type. It possesses a typical feature of many minerals of its type locality, the Tolbachik volcano, namely being a salt with oxide anions. However, it is the first Tolbachik copper oxysalt that is both arsenate and sulfate. Vasilseverginite is monoclinic, with space group P2_{1}/n.
