= Arseniosiderite =

Arsenate mineral

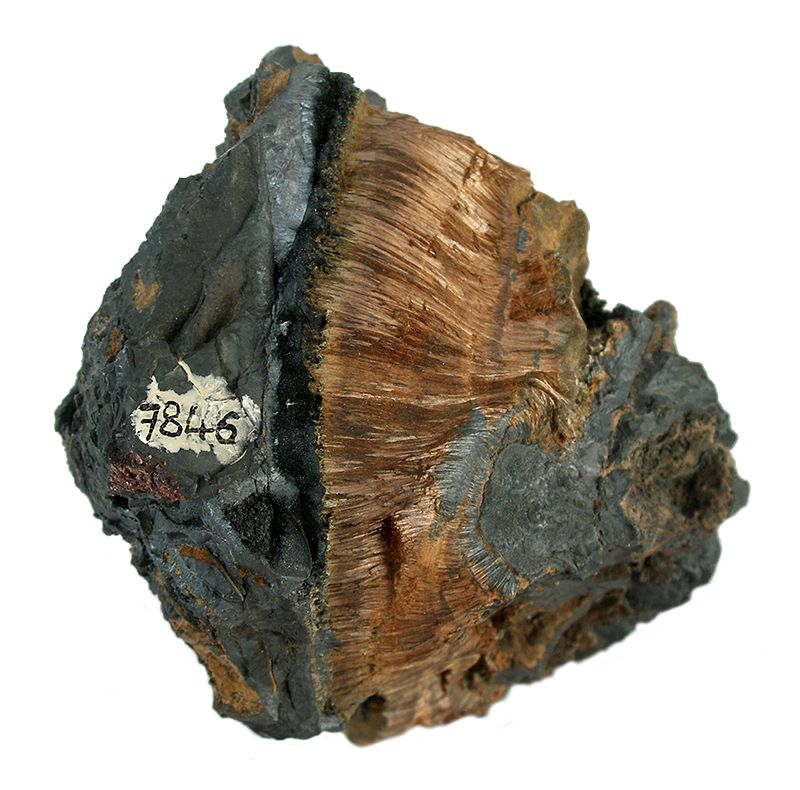
- Arseniosiderite, size: 6.4×6.2×5.6 mm

General
- Category: Arsenate mineral
- Formula: Ca_{2}Fe^{3+}_{3}(AsO_{4})_{3}O_{2}·3H_{2}O
- IMA symbol: Assd
- Strunz classification: 8.DH.30 08
- Dana classification: 42.09.02.03
- Crystal system: Monoclinic
- Crystal class: Prismatic (2/m) (same H-M symbol)
- Space group: A2/a
- Unit cell: a = 17.76, b = 19.53 c = 11.3 [Å], Z = 12

Identification
- Formula mass: 766.50 g/mol
- Color: Bronze brown; yellow to black
- Crystal habit: Fibrous
- Cleavage: {100} good
- Mohs scale hardness: 4.5
- Luster: Submetallic
- Streak: Ochraceous
- Diaphaneity: Translucent to opaque
- Specific gravity: 3.5–3.9, average = 3.7
- Optical properties: Biaxial (−)
- Refractive index: n_{α} = 1.815, n_{β} = 1.898, n_{γ} = 1.898
- Birefringence: δ = 0.083
- Other characteristics: Non-fluorescent

Arseniosiderite is a rare arsenate mineral formed by the oxidation of other arsenic-containing minerals, such as scorodite or arsenopyrite. It occurs in association with beudantite, carminite, dussertite, pharmacolite, pitticite, adamite and erythrite. The name arseniosiderite reflects two major elements of the mineral, arsenic and iron (Greek sideros means iron).
