= Beudantite =

Secondary mineral of the alunite group

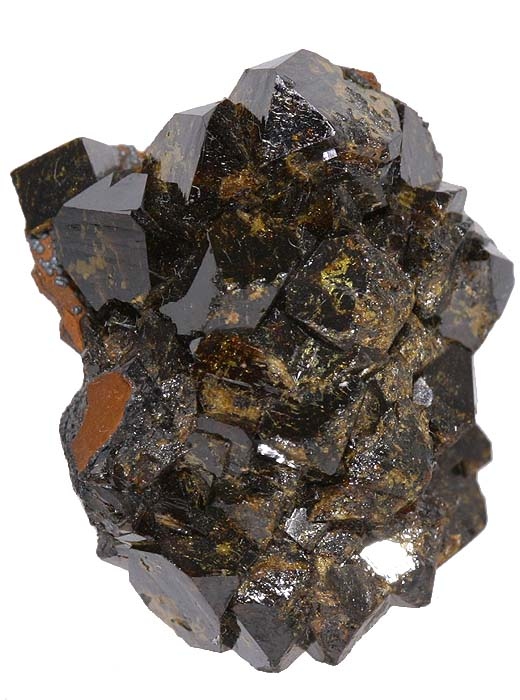
- Large brown crystals of beudantite

General
- Category: Arsenate minerals
- Formula: PbFe_{3}(OH)_{6}SO_{4}AsO_{4}
- IMA symbol: Bdn
- Strunz classification: 8.BL.10
- Dana classification: 43.4.1.1
- Crystal system: Trigonal
- Crystal class: Hexagonal scalenohedral (3̅m); H-M symbol: (3̅ 2/m)
- Space group: R3̅m
- Unit cell: a = 7.32 Å, c = 17.02 Å; Z = 3

Identification
- Color: black, dark green, brown, yellowish, red, greenish yellow, brown
- Crystal habit: tabular, acute rhombohedral, pseudo-cubic, pseudo-cuboctahedral
- Cleavage: distinct; good on {0001}
- Mohs scale hardness: 3.5–4.5
- Luster: vitreous, resinous
- Streak: grayish yellow to green
- Diaphaneity: transparent, translucent
- Specific gravity: 4.48
- Optical properties: Uniaxial (−)
- Refractive index: n_{ω} = 1.957 n_{ε} = 1.943
- Birefringence: δ = 0.014
- Pleochroism: visible
- Other characteristics: Soluble in HCl

Beudandite is a secondary mineral occurring in the oxidized zones of polymetallic deposits. It is a lead, iron, arsenate, sulfate with endmember formula: PbFe_{3}(OH)_{6}SO_{4}AsO_{4}.

Beudantite is in a subgroup of the alunite group. It is the arsenate analogue of the phosphate corkite. Beudantite also forms a solid-solution with segnitite and plumbojarosite.

It crystallizes in the trigonal crystal system and shows a variety of crystal habits including tabular, acute rhombohedral, pseudo-cubic and pseudo-cuboctahedral.

It occurs in association with carminite, scorodite, mimetite, dussertite, arseniosiderite, pharmacosiderite, olivenite, bayldonite, duftite, anglesite, cerussite and azurite.

== Discovery ==
Beudantite was first described in 1826 for an occurrence in the Louise Mine, Wied Iron Spar District, Westerwald, Rhineland-Palatinate, Germany. It was named by Armand Lévy after his fellow Frenchman and mineralogist François Sulpice Beudant (1787–1850).

== See also ==
- List of minerals
- List of minerals named after people
