= Scorodite =

Hydrated iron arsenate mineral

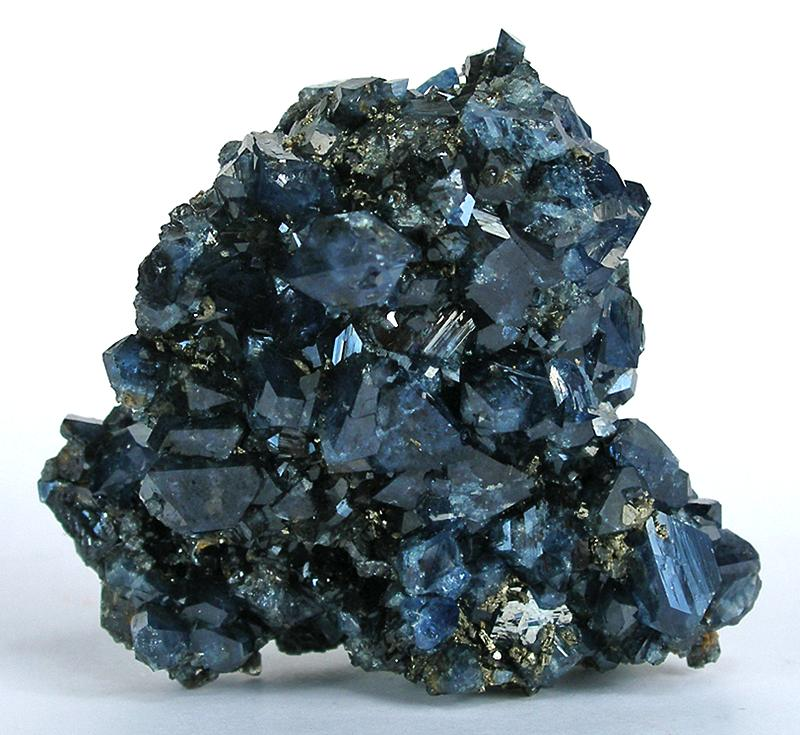

General
- Category: Arsenate minerals
- Formula: FeAsO_{4}·2H_{2}O
- IMA symbol: Scd
- Strunz classification: 8.CD.10
- Crystal system: Orthorhombic
- Crystal class: Dipyramidal (mmm); H-M symbol: (2/m 2/m 2/m)
- Space group: Pcab
- Unit cell: a = 8.937 Å, b = 10.278 Å c = 9.996 Å; Z = 8

Identification
- Color: Green, blue-green, grey, grayish-green, blue, yellow-brown, nearly colorless, violet
- Fracture: Sub-conchoidal
- Mohs scale hardness: 3.5–4
- Luster: Sub-adamantine, vitreous, resinous
- Streak: Greenish-white
- Diaphaneity: Translucent
- Density: measured: 3.27 g/cm^{3} calculated: 3.276 g/cm^{3}
- Optical properties: Biaxial (+)
- Pleochroism: Weak
- 2V angle: Measured: 40° to 75° Calculated: 46° to 80°
- Dispersion: relatively strong r > v

Scorodite is a common hydrated iron arsenate mineral, with the chemical formula FeAsO_{4}·2H_{2}O. It is found in hydrothermal deposits and as a secondary mineral in gossans worldwide. Scorodite weathers to limonite.

Scorodite was discovered in Schwarzenberg, Saxony, Germany. Named from the Greek Scorodion, "garlicky". When heated it smells of garlic, which gives it the name.
