= Anglesite =

Lead sulfate mineral

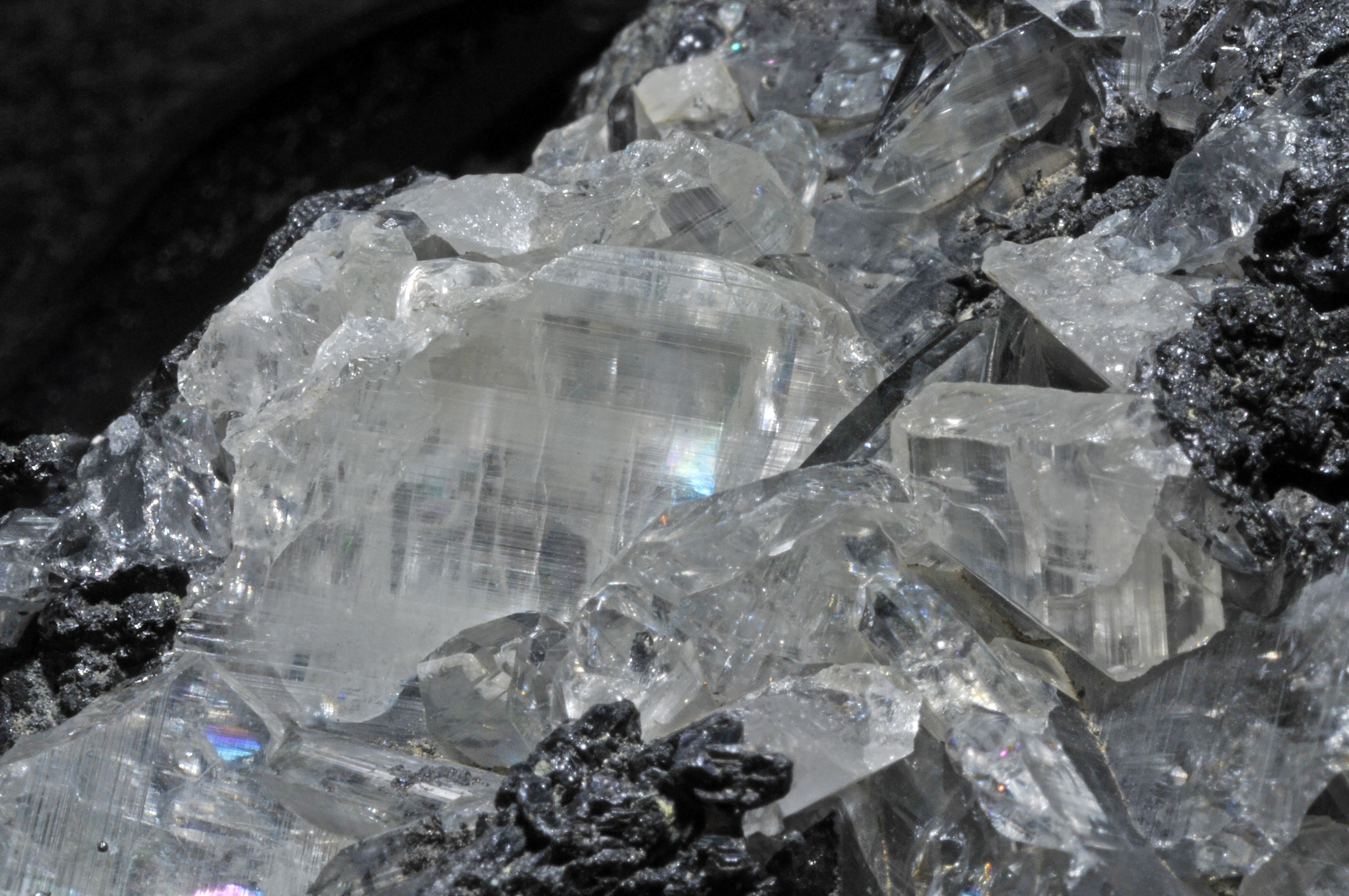
- Anglesite from Morocco

General
- Category: Sulfate minerals
- Formula: PbSO_{4}
- IMA symbol: Ang
- Strunz classification: 7.AD.35
- Dana classification: 28.3.1.3
- Crystal system: Orthorhombic
- Crystal class: Dipyramidal (mmm); H-M symbol: (2/m 2/m 2/m)
- Space group: Pnma

Identification
- Color: Colorless to white, commonly tinted gray; orange, yellow, green, blue, rarely violet
- Crystal habit: Granular, banded, nodular to stalactitic
- Cleavage: [001] good, [210] distinct
- Fracture: Conchoidal
- Tenacity: Brittle
- Mohs scale hardness: 2.5–3.0
- Luster: Adamantine crystals, dull when massive earthy
- Streak: White
- Diaphaneity: Transparent to translucent
- Specific gravity: 6.3
- Optical properties: Biaxial (+)
- Refractive index: n_{α} = 1.878 n_{β} = 1.883 n_{γ} = 1.895
- 2V angle: 75° (measured), 68° (calculated)
- Fusibility: 1.5

Anglesite is a lead sulfate mineral with the chemical formula PbSO_{4}. It occurs as an oxidation product of primary lead sulfide ore, galena. Anglesite occurs as prismatic orthorhombic crystals and earthy masses, and is isomorphous with barite and celestine. It contains 74% of lead by mass and therefore has a high specific gravity of 6.3. Anglesite's color is white or gray with pale yellow streaks. It may be dark gray if impure.

It was first recognized as a mineral species by William Withering in 1783, who discovered it in the Parys copper-mine in Anglesey; the name anglesite, from this locality, was given by F. S. Beudant in 1832. The crystals from Anglesey, which were formerly found abundantly on a matrix of dull limonite, are small in size and simple in form, being usually bounded by four faces of a prism and four faces of a dome; they are brownish-yellow in colour owing to a stain of limonite. Crystals from some other localities, notably from Monteponi in Sardinia, are transparent and colourless, possessed of a brilliant adamantine lustre, and usually modified by numerous bright faces. The variety of combinations and habits presented by the crystals is very extensive, nearly two hundred distinct forms being figured by V. von Lang in his monograph of the species; without measurement of the angles the crystals are frequently difficult to decipher. There are distinct cleavages parallel to the faces of the prism (110) and the basal plane (001), but these are not so well developed as in the isomorphous minerals barite and celestite.

Anglesite is a mineral of secondary origin, having been formed by the oxidation of galena in the upper parts of mineral lodes where these have been affected by weathering processes. At Monteponi the crystals encrust cavities in glistening granular galena; and from Leadhills, in Scotland, pseudomorphs of anglesite after galena are known. At most localities it is found as isolated crystals in the lead-bearing lodes, but at some places, in Australia and Mexico, it occurs as large masses, and is then mined as an ore of lead.

Anglesite is sometimes used as a gemstone.

== Gallery ==
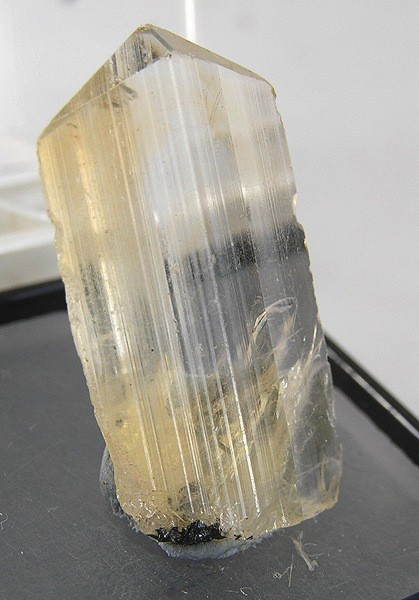
Anglesite crystal from Touissit District, Morocco (size: 2.8 × 1.6 × 0.5 cm)

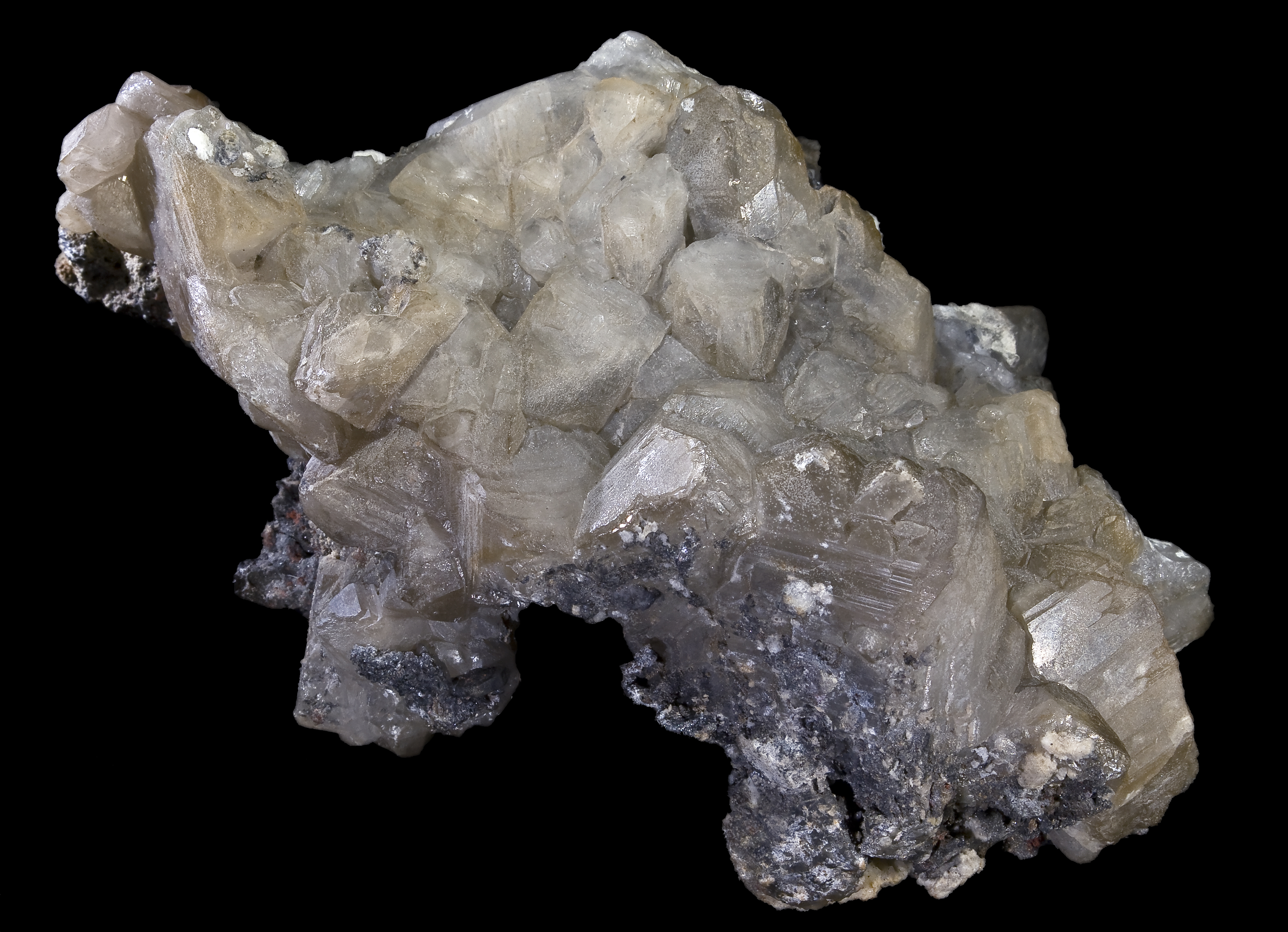
Anglesite from Monteponi Mine, Iglesias, Carbonia-Iglesias Province (size: 15.3 × 7 cm)

Anglesite diagram illustrating its orthorhombic crystalline form

== See also ==
- Lead(II) sulfate

== Bibliography ==
- Palache, P.; Berman H.; Frondel, C. (1960). "Dana's System of Mineralogy, Volume II: Halides, Nitrates, Borates, Carbonates, Sulfates, Phosphates, Arsenates, Tungstates, Molybdates, Etc. (Seventh Edition)" John Wiley and Sons, Inc., New York, pp. 420–424.
