= Alunite =

Aluminium potassium sulfate mineral

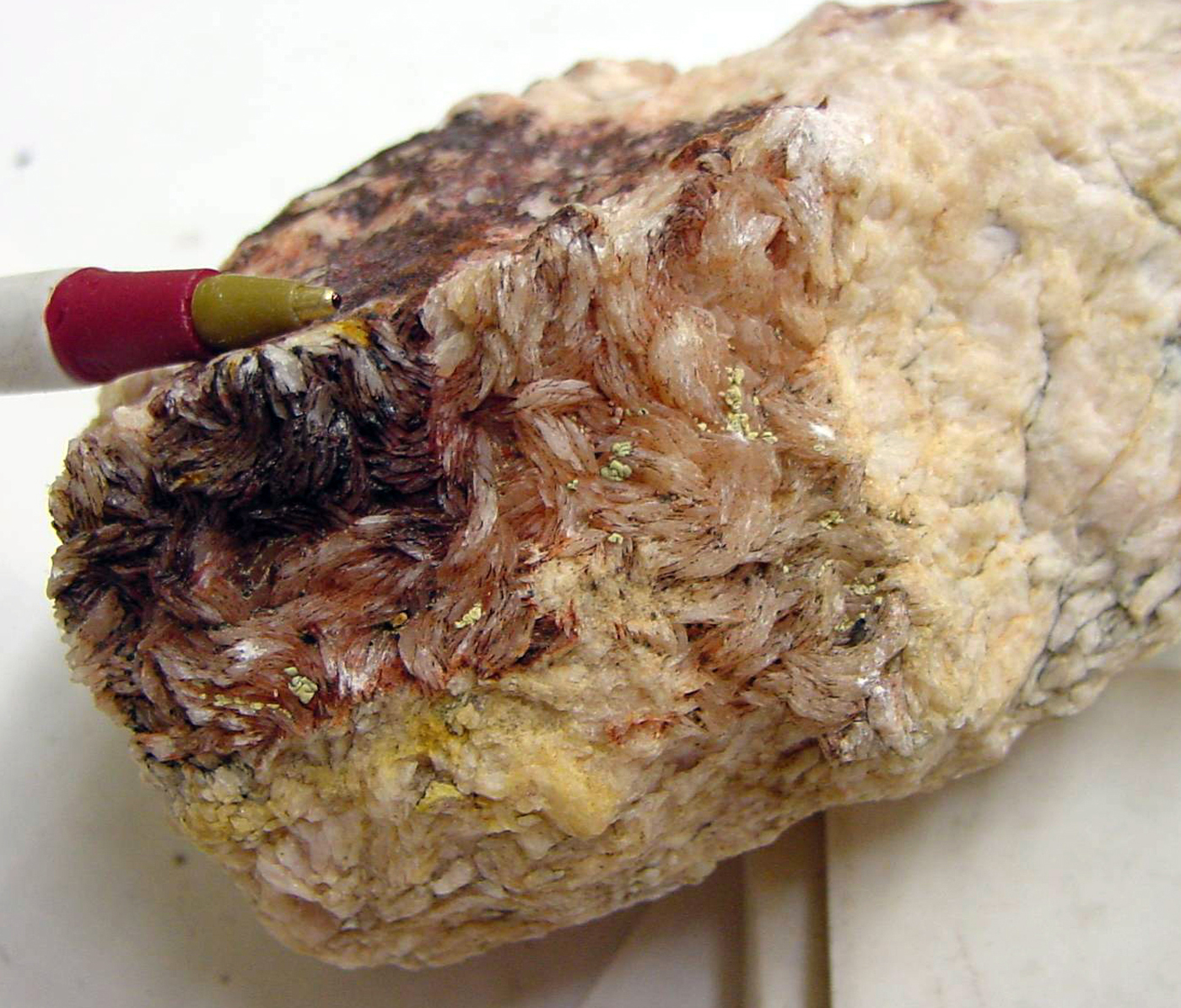
- Alunite from Utah - USGS

General
- Category: Sulfate minerals
- Formula: KAl_{3}(SO_{4})_{2}(OH)_{6}
- IMA symbol: Alu
- Strunz classification: 7.BC.10
- Crystal system: Trigonal
- Crystal class: Hexagonal scalenohedral (3̅m); Space group: (3̅ 2/m)
- Space group: R3̅m
- Unit cell: a = 6.98, c = 17.32 [Å]; Z = 3

Identification
- Color: Yellow, red, to reddish brown, colorless if pure; may be white, pale shades of gray
- Crystal habit: fibrous to columnar, porcelaneous, commonly granular to dense massive
- Cleavage: On {0001}, perfect
- Fracture: Conchoidal
- Tenacity: Brittle
- Mohs scale hardness: 3.5 – 4
- Luster: Vitreous, somewhat pearly on {0001} for crystals, earthy if massive
- Streak: White
- Diaphaneity: Transparent to translucent
- Specific gravity: 2.6 – 2.9
- Optical properties: Uniaxial (+)
- Refractive index: n_{ω} = 1.572 n_{ε} = 1.592
- Birefringence: δ = 0.020
- Other characteristics: Strongly pyroelectric Radioactive 9.44% (K)

Not to be confused with Alum or Potassium alum

Alunite is a hydroxylated aluminium potassium sulfate mineral, formula KAl_{3}(SO_{4})_{2}(OH)_{6}. It was first observed in the 15th century at Tolfa, near Rome, where it was mined for the manufacture of alum. First called aluminilite by J.C. Delamétherie in 1797, this name was contracted by François Beudant three decades later to alunite.

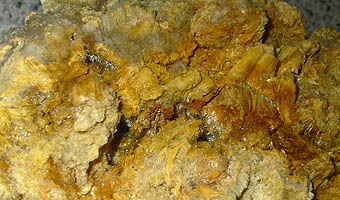
Alunite from Slovakia

Alunite crystals morphologically are rhombohedra with interfacial angles of 90° 50', causing them to resemble cubes. Crystal symmetry is trigonal. Minute glistening crystals have also been found loose in cavities in altered rhyolite. Alunite varies in color from white to yellow gray. The hardness on the Mohs scale is 4 and the specific gravity is between 2.6 and 2.8. It is insoluble in water or weak acids, but soluble in sulfuric acid.

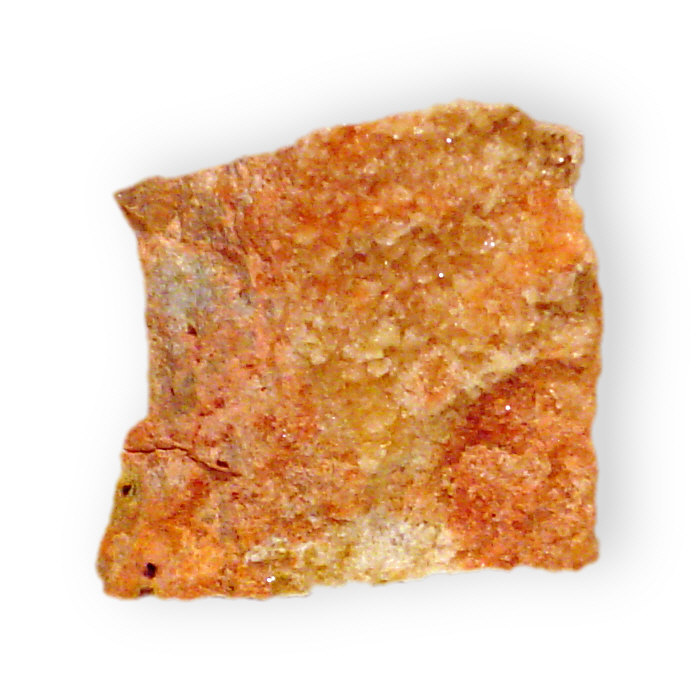
Alunite from Marysvale, Utah

Sodium can substitute for potassium in the mineral, and when the sodium content is high, is called natroalunite.

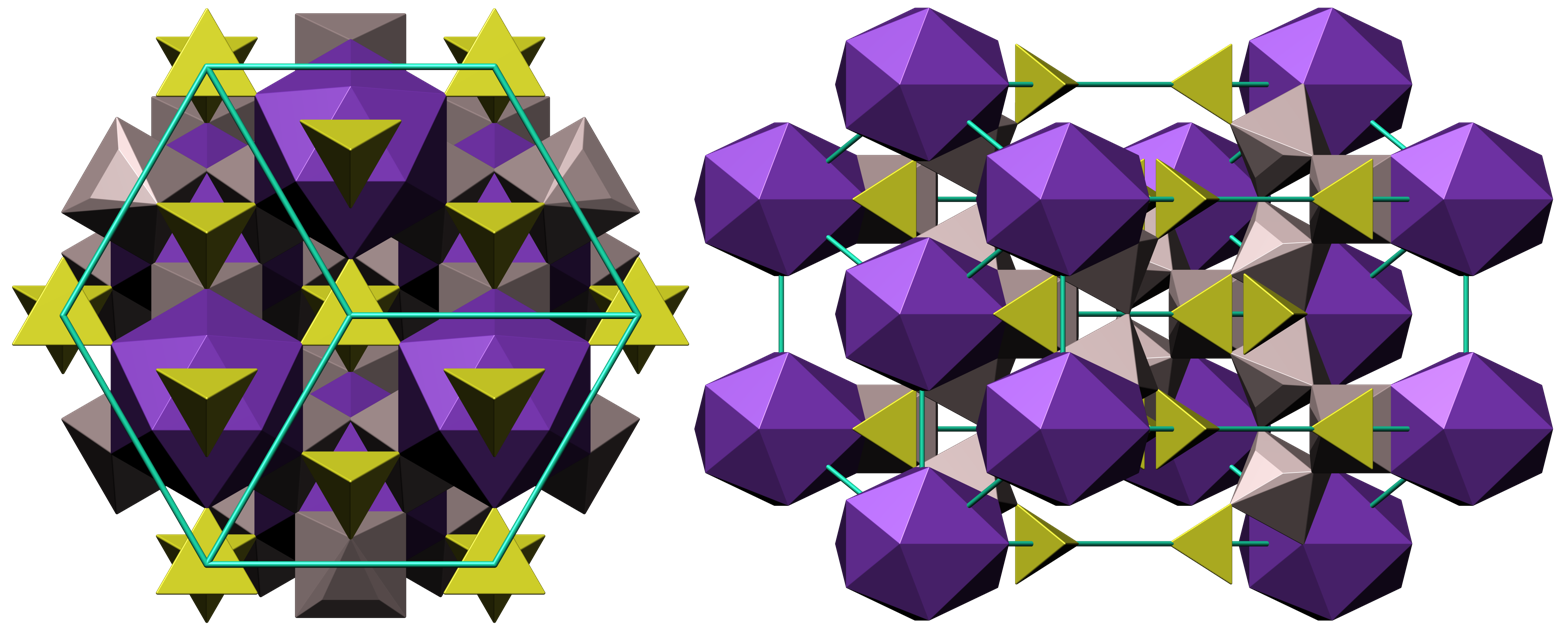
Crystal structure of alunite

Alunite is an analog of jarosite, where aluminium replaces Fe^{3+}. Alunite occurs as a secondary mineral on iron sulfate ores.

Alunite occurs as veins and replacement masses in trachyte, rhyolite, and similar potassium rich volcanic rocks. It is formed by the action of sulfuric acid bearing solutions on these rocks during the oxidation and leaching of metal sulfide deposits. Alunite also is found near volcanic fumaroles. The white, finely granular masses closely resemble finely granular limestone, dolomite, anhydrite, and magnesite in appearance. The more compact kinds from Hungary are so hard and tough that they have been used for millstones.

Historically extensive deposits were mined in Tuscany and Hungary, and at Bulahdelah, New South Wales, Australia. It is currently mined at Tolfa, Italy. In the United States it is found in the San Juan district of Colorado; Goldfield, Nevada; the ghost town of Alunite, Utah near Marysvale; and Red Mountain near Patagonia, Arizona. The Arizona occurrence lies appropriately above a canyon named Alum Gulch. Alunite is mined as an ore of both potassium and aluminium at Marysvale. Some of the ore deposits were located by airborne and satellite multispectral imaging.

An article in the May/June 2019 issue of Archaeology magazine states that in China, in Henan province, an assortment of ceramic objects and jars were found, dating back 2000 years. In one of the jars, a mixture of alunite and potassium nitrate was found. The mixture was then thought to be a "mixture of immortality" mentioned in ancient Chinese texts. Obviously, this does not appear to have succeeded.

== See also ==
- Acid mine drainage
- Alum
- Jarosite
