= Bayldonite =

Secondary mineral

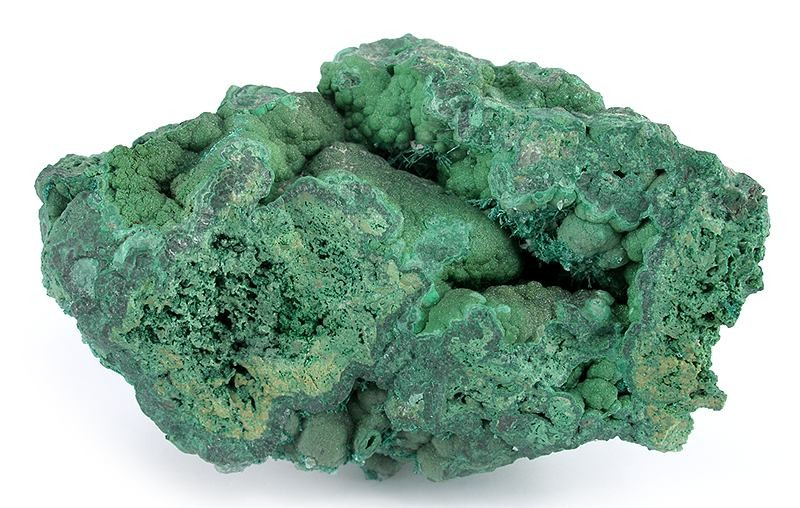
- Bayldonite, Tsumeb, Namibia

General
- Category: Arsenate minerals
- Formula: PbCu_{3}(AsO_{4})_{2}(OH)_{2}
- IMA symbol: Bay
- Strunz classification: 8.BH.45
- Crystal system: Monoclinic
- Crystal class: Prismatic (2/m) (same H-M symbol)
- Space group: C2/c

Identification
- Color: Green, apple-green
- Crystal habit: Mammillary crust
- Twinning: Pseudoscalenohedral trillings with the composition plane
- Cleavage: None observed
- Fracture: Irregular/uneven, conchoidal, sub-conchoidal, fibrous
- Tenacity: Brittle
- Mohs scale hardness: 4 1/2
- Luster: Resinous, waxy, greasy
- Streak: Siskin green to apple green
- Diaphaneity: Transparent, translucent
- Density: 5.24–5.65 g/cm^{3} (measured), 5.707 g/cm^{3} (calculated)
- Optical properties: Biaxial (+)
- Refractive index: n_{α} = 1.951 n_{β} = 1.970 n_{γ} = 1.991
- Birefringence: 0.040
- Pleochroism: Non-pleochroic
- 2V angle: 89°
- Dispersion: r < v strong
- Extinction: Y^elongation = 45°; X=b

Bayldonite (BAIL-done-ite) is a rare secondary mineral with the chemical formula PbCu_{3}(AsO_{4})_{2}(OH)_{2}. Its provenance has been attributed to Penberthy Croft Mine, Cornwall, England, United Kingdom but there is no substantiating evidence for this and it was only attributed to Cornwall by Church (1865). Also, Church's paper (Church, 1865) clearly states "I am indebted to Mr. Talling for this mineral species also." so the original material was supplied by the mineral dealer Richard Talling and not discovered by Bayldon. Bayldonite was named after Church's dear friend and colleague at the Royal Agricultural College (RAC), Cirencester, Gloucestershire John Bayldon MD (1837–1872). Specimens are also found in Tsumeb, Namibia, and Arizona, United States. It is sometimes used as a gemstone.
