= Tucson Gem & Mineral Show =

Annual trade and hobbyist show

Coordinates: 32.1306°N 110.5827°W

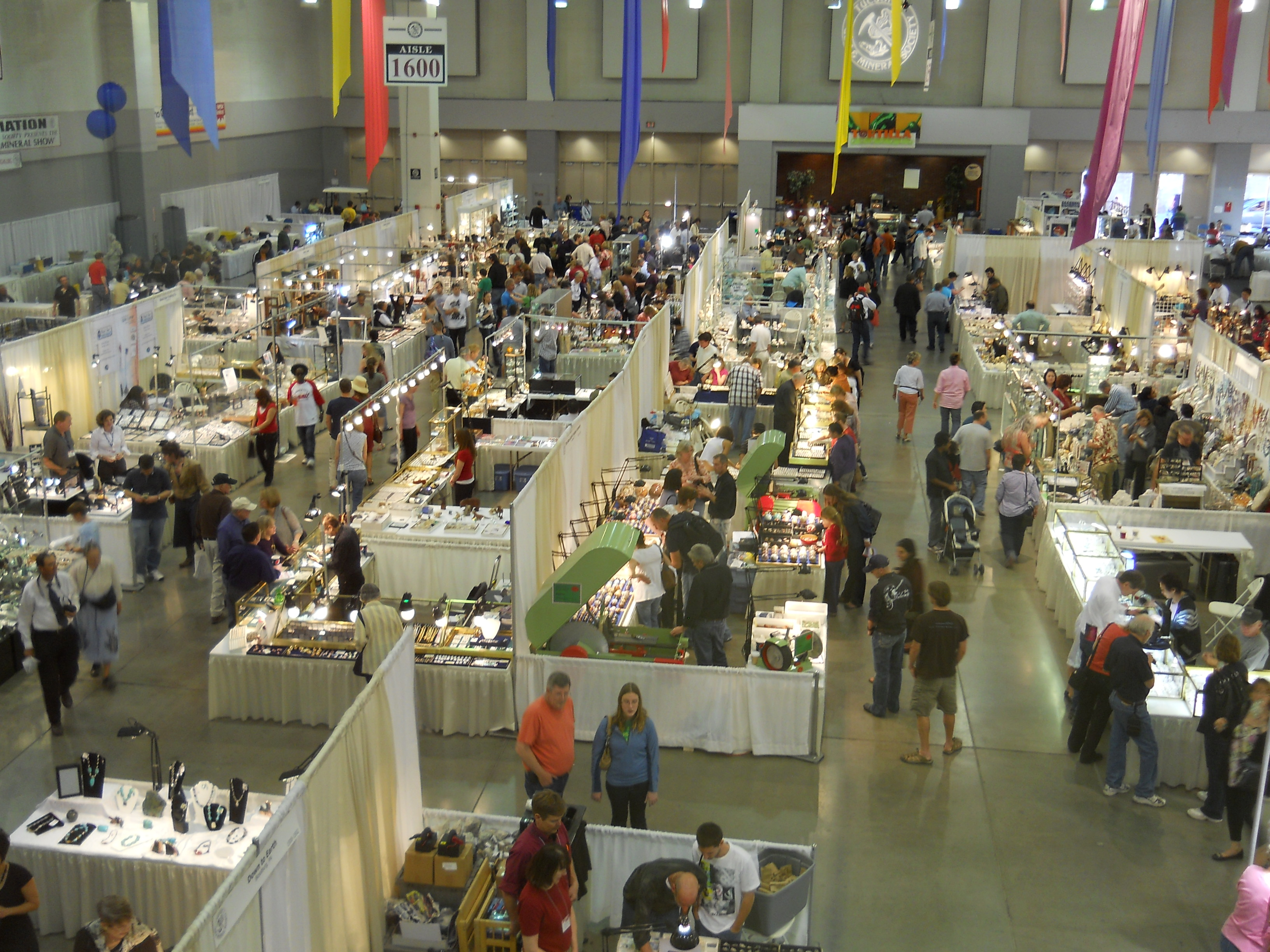
Overview of the Tucson Gem and Mineral Show, Tucson Convention Center, 2011

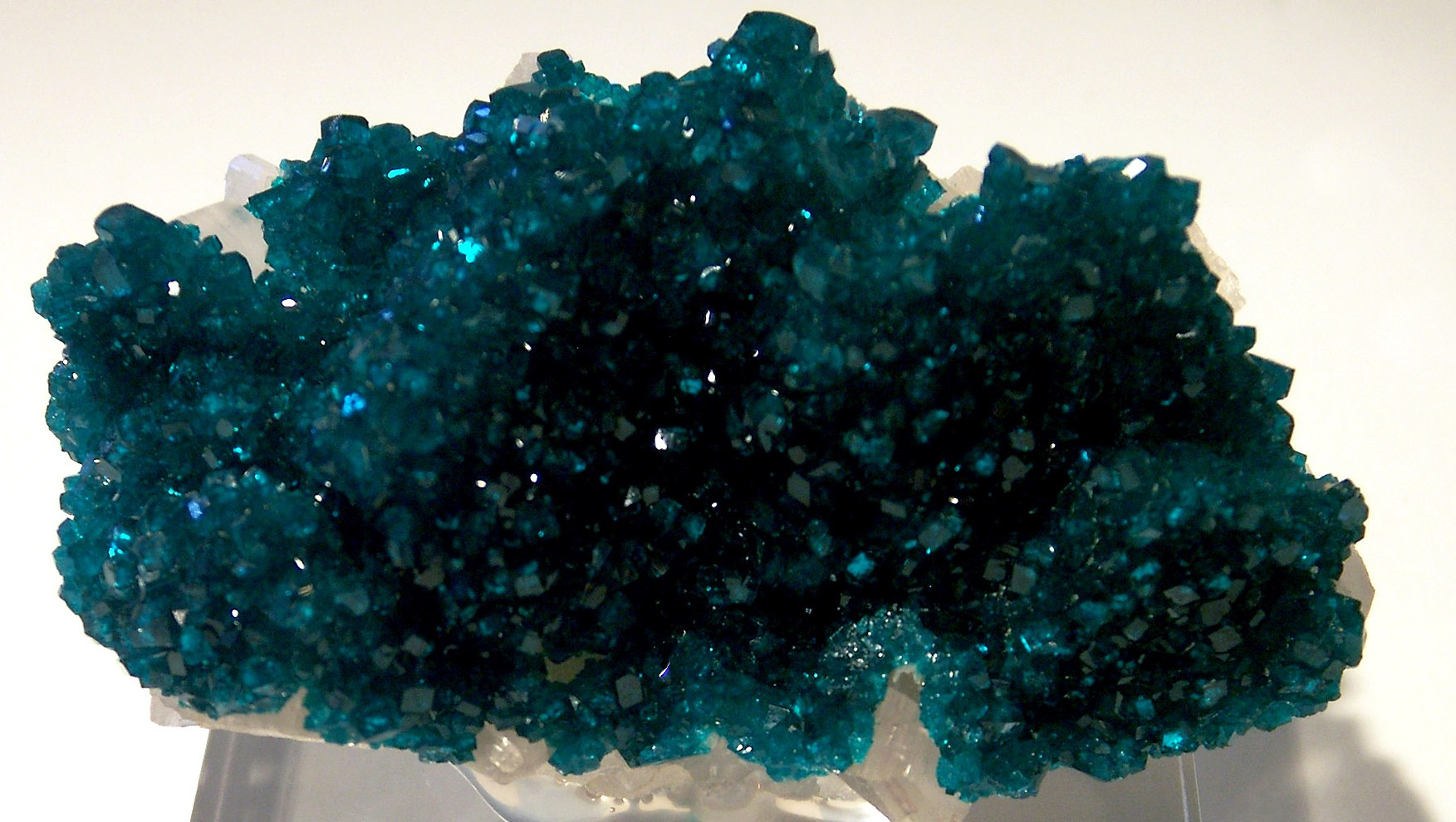
Tsumeb dioptase, 2007 show

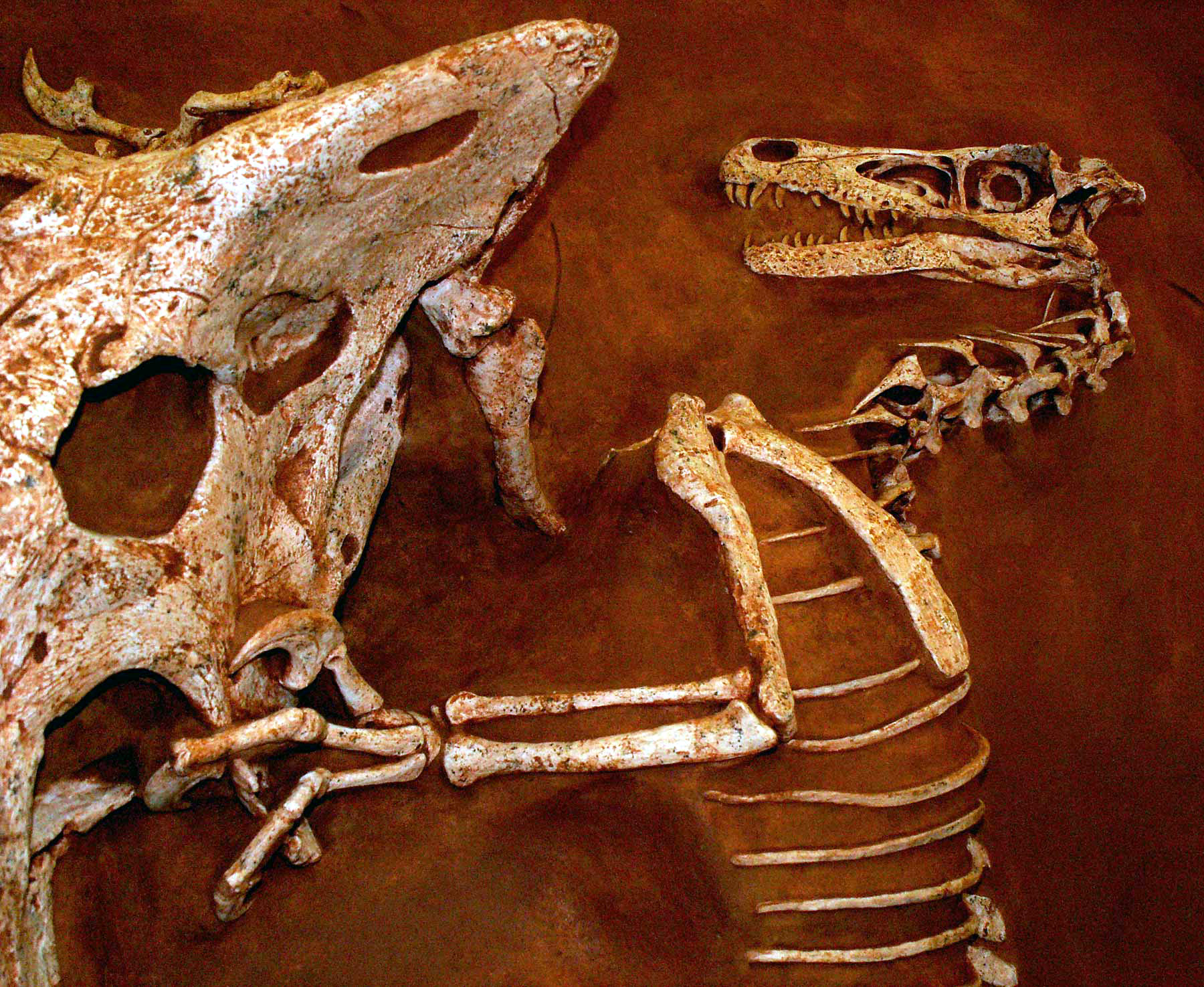
Protoceratops and Velociraptor fossil replicas, 2007 show

The Tucson Gem, Mineral & Fossil Showcase are gem and mineral shows that take place annually in late January and February at multiple locations across the city of Tucson, Arizona. Most of the shows are open to the public, except for certain trade shows which require registration with a business license.

The key event of the Gem, Mineral & Fossil Showcase is the Tucson Gem & Mineral Show produced by the Tucson Gem and Mineral Society. This show has been held annually since 1955 and now occupies 181,000 square feet (16,800 m^{2}) of the Tucson Convention Center. Many museums and universities, including the Smithsonian Institution and the Sorbonne, have displayed at the Tucson Gem and Mineral Show.

The first Tucson Gem and Mineral Show was held in an elementary school in 1955 and shortly thereafter moved to a Quonset hut at the Tucson Fair Grounds. In 1973, it moved into the Tucson Community Center, first occupying the North Exhibit Hall, then expanding into the Arena and upper Arena concourse. After the completion of the new facility in 1990, which is now called the Tucson Convention Center, the Tucson Gem and Mineral Show now occupies the Arena, Exhibition Halls A-B-C, Galleria and Ballrooms. Katherine Rambo estimates that between 1996 and 2010 there was an average of about thirteen hundred total dealers from forty-nine states and thirty-two countries in attendance, annually. The 2021 show was canceled due to the COVID-19 pandemic.

The Tucson Gem, Mineral & Fossil Showcase is one of the single highest revenue-producing events for the Tucson economy. The estimated economic impact in 2019 was $131.4 million, according to Jane Roxbury, director of gem show services for Visit Tucson.

The 2021 showcase was pushed back from the typical dates to April due to the COVID-19 pandemic. While some of the shows were present, the main show at the Tucson Convention Center and some of the other shows were cancelled.

== See also ==
- Denver Coliseum Mineral, Fossil, Gem, and Jewelry Show, second largest U.S. show.
- Mineral collecting
- Mineralientage, the Munich Mineral Show, Europe's largest
