= Creedite =

Halide mineral

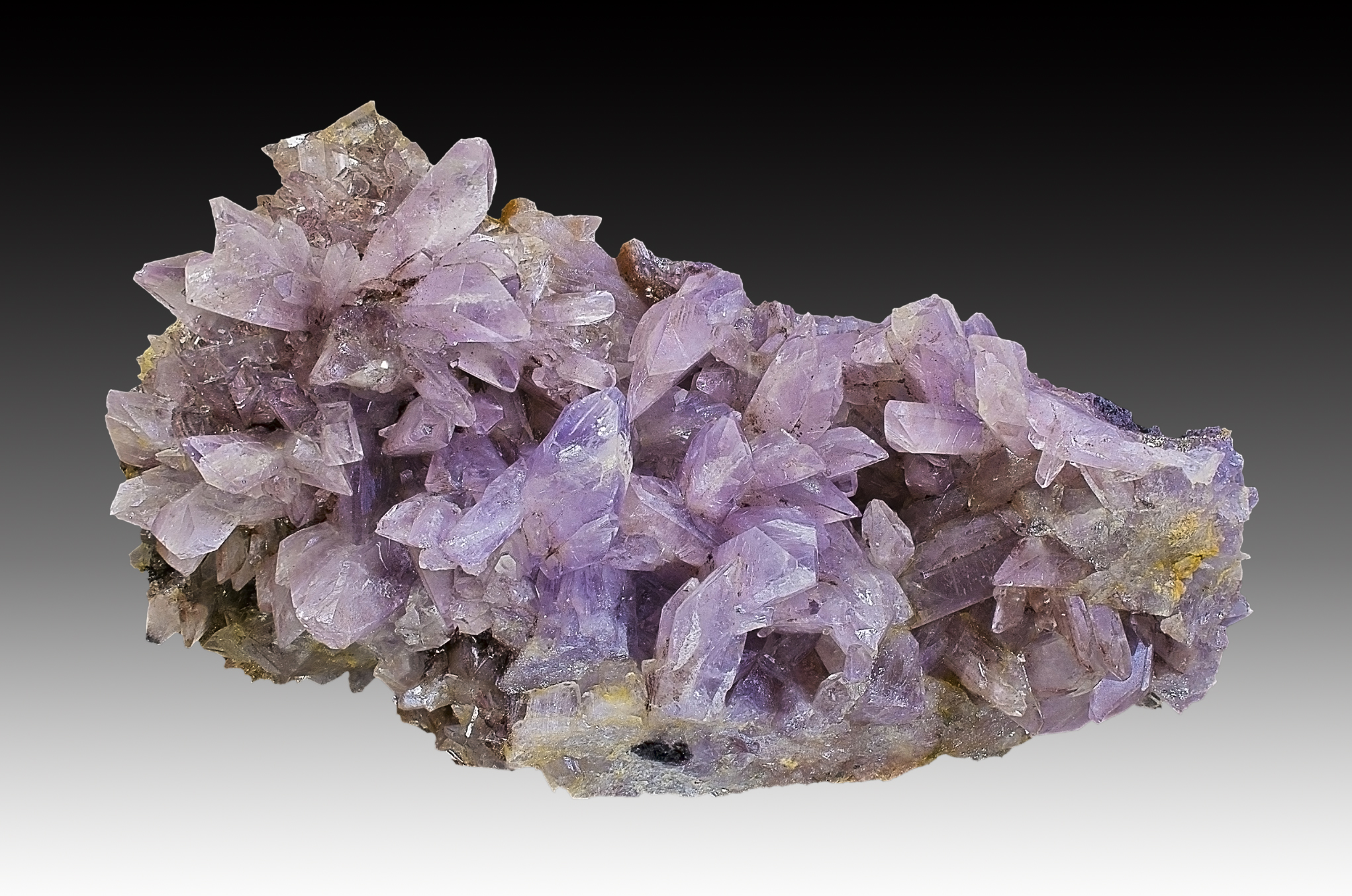
- Creedite, Santa Eulalia District, Municipio de Aquiles Serdán, Chihuahua, Mexico

General
- Category: Halide mineral
- Formula: Ca_{3}Al_{2}SO_{4}(F,OH)_{10}·2(H_{2}O)
- IMA symbol: Cee
- Strunz classification: 3.CG.15
- Crystal system: Monoclinic
- Crystal class: Prismatic (2/m) (same H-M symbol)
- Space group: C2/c
- Unit cell: a = 13.91 Å, b = 8.58 Å, c = 10 Å; β = 94.4°; Z = 4

Identification
- Color: Colorless, white, violet, orange
- Crystal habit: Generally appears as anhedral to subhedral in matrix; bladelike prismatic and radial, drusy to granular aggregates
- Cleavage: Perfect on {100}
- Fracture: Conchoidal
- Tenacity: Brittle
- Mohs scale hardness: 3.5 - 4
- Luster: Vitreous
- Streak: White
- Diaphaneity: Transparent to translucent
- Specific gravity: 2.71
- Optical properties: Biaxial (-)
- Refractive index: n_{α} = 1.461 n_{β} = 1.478 n_{γ} = 1.485
- Birefringence: δ = 0.024
- 2V angle: 65°
- Dispersion: r > v strong

Creedite is a halide mineral with the chemical formula Ca_{3}Al_{2}SO_{4}(F,OH)_{10}·2(H_{2}O). Creedite forms colorless to white to purple monoclinic prismatic crystals. It often occurs as acicular radiating sprays of fine prisms. It is translucent to transparent with indices of refraction of n_{α} = 1.461, n_{β} = 1.478, n_{γ} = 1.485. It has a Mohs hardness of 3.5 to 4 and a specific gravity of 2.7.

Creedite was first described in 1916 from the Creede Quadrangle in Mineral County, Colorado. It is a product of intense oxidation of ore deposits.

== Occurrence ==
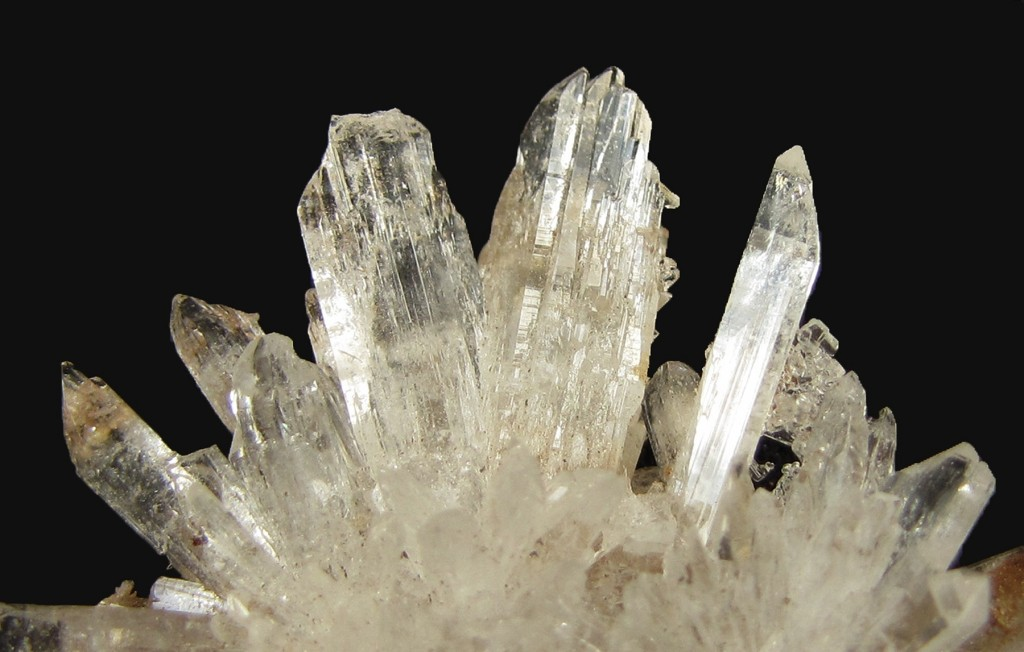
Creedite, Qinglong Sb-Au deposit, Qinglong County, Guizhou Province, China. Overall (size: 3.4 x 3.0 x 1.3 cm)

Creedite is a rare hydroxylhalide mineral. Creedite usually forms from the oxidation of fluorite ore deposits. Creedite was named after the location where it was discovered in 1916 in the Colorado Fluorspar Co. Mine at Wagon Wheel Gap, located at Creede Quadrangle, Mineral County, Colorado.

It was later found in other fluorite veins near Tonopah, Nye County, Nevada; in the Grand Reef mine, Graham County, Arizona; in the Darwin district, Inyo County, California. It also occurs in the Potosi and other mines of Santa Eulalia, Chihuahua, Mexico. It is also found in La Paz, Bolivia; Pamir Mountains, Tajikistan and Dzhezkazgan, Kazakhstan.

== Geologic association ==
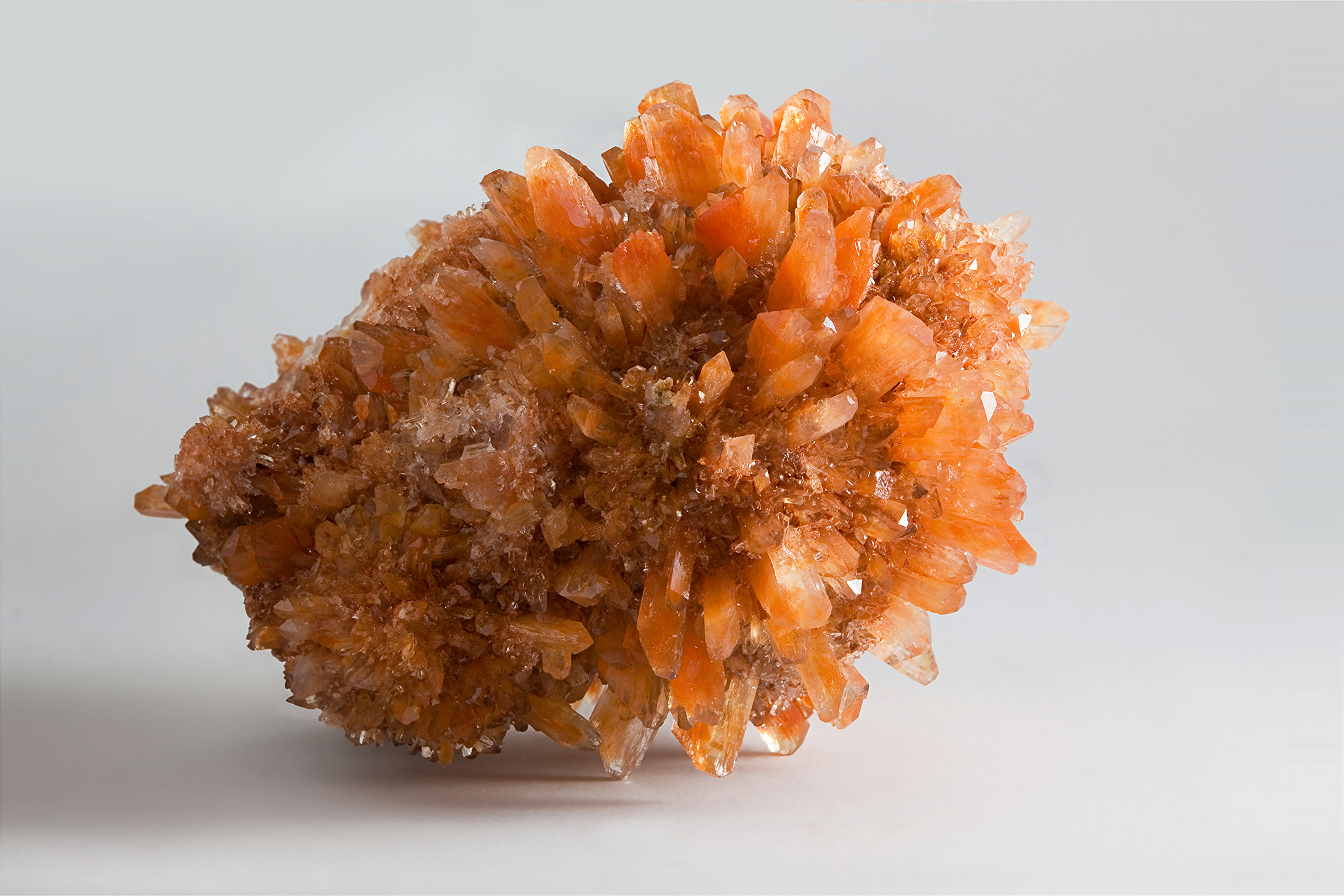
Creedite, Navidad Mine, Rodeo, Durango, Mexico

Creedite typically occurs with low-grade metamorphic rocks on a fluorite – calcite – quartz matrix or on a sulfide-matrix with its oxidized products. Creedite most commonly found in the form of creedite – carbonate – cyanotrichite – woodwardite – spangolite – kaolinite association. The other less common creedite association is creedite – limonite – kaolinite – hemimorphite – smithsonite – hydrozincite – aurichalcite. Creedite also occurs in skarn formation which usually has association with sulfides, spangolite, brochantite, linarite, limonite, cuprite, wad and kaolinite. In general, creedite is usually found as two to three millimeters radial aggregates and less commonly as a single prismatic crystals up to one millimeters long.

== Structure ==
Creedite structural composition study was conducted by utilizing 1390 Philips diffractometer with Fe – filtered CoK radiation (λ=1.79021Å), 10–90° 2θ range, peak-height relative intensities. It was concluded that the creedite falls into monoclinic crystal system (2/m) that has space group of C2/c. It was also found that creedite has basal reflections of (2 0 0) and (4 0 0) that are enhanced due to preferred orientation which concur with Michael Fleischer's orientation.
