= Dioptase =

Cyclosilicate mineral

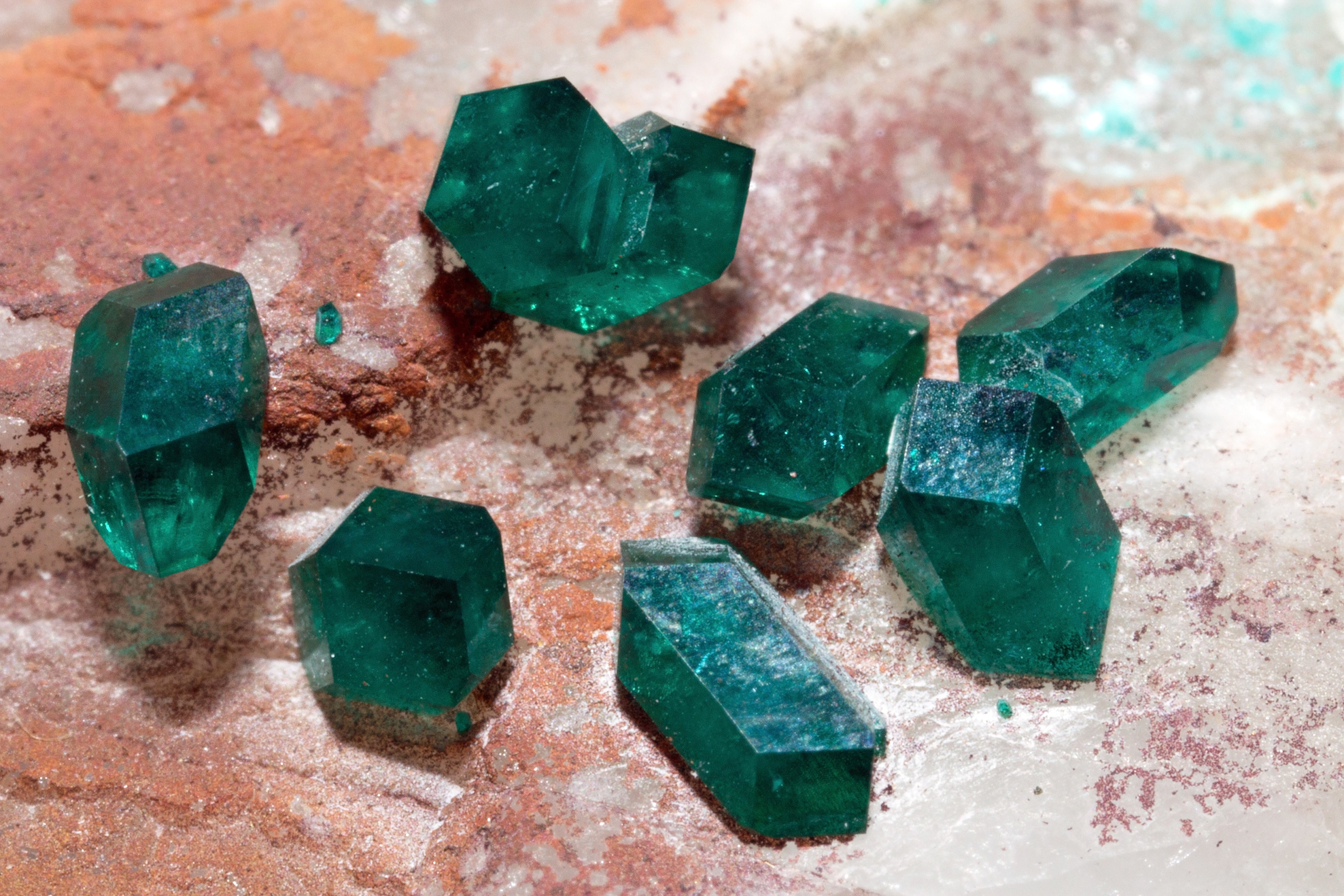

General
- Category: Cyclosilicates
- Formula: Cu_{6}Si_{6}O_{18}·6H_{2}O
- IMA symbol: Dpt
- Strunz classification: 9.CJ.30
- Crystal system: Trigonal
- Crystal class: Rhombohedral (3̅); H–M symbol: (3̅)
- Space group: R3̅ (No. 148)
- Unit cell: a = 14.566, c = 7.778 [Å]; Z = 18

Identification
- Color: Dark teal, emerald green
- Crystal habit: Six-sided prisms terminated by rhombohedrons, to massive
- Cleavage: Perfect in three directions
- Fracture: Conchoidal
- Tenacity: Brittle
- Mohs scale hardness: 5
- Luster: Vitreous
- Streak: Green
- Diaphaneity: Transparent to translucent
- Specific gravity: 3.28–3.35
- Optical properties: Uniaxial (+)
- Refractive index: nω = 1.652 – 1.658 nε = 1.704 – 1.710
- Birefringence: δ = 0.052

Dioptase is an intense emerald-green to bluish-green mineral that is cyclosilicate of copper. It is transparent to translucent. Its luster is vitreous to sub-adamantine. Its formula is Cu_{6}Si_{6}O_{18}·6H_{2}O, also reported as CuSiO_{2}(OH)_{2}. It has a Mohs hardness of 5, the same as tooth enamel. Its specific gravity is 3.28–3.35, and it has two perfect and one very good cleavage directions. Additionally, dioptase is very fragile, and specimens must be handled with great care. It is a trigonal mineral, forming six-sided crystals that are terminated by rhombohedra.

It is popular with mineral collectors and is sometimes cut into small gems. It can also be pulverized and used as a pigment for painting.

== History ==
Dioptase was used to highlight the edges of the eyes on the three Pre-Pottery Neolithic B lime plaster statues discovered at 'Ain Ghazal, known as Micah, Heifa and Noah. These sculptures date back to about 7200 BC.

Late in the 18th century, copper miners at the Altyn-Tyube (Altyn-Tube) mine, Karagandy Province, Kazakhstan thought they had found the emerald deposit of their dreams. They found fantastic cavities in quartz veins in a limestone rock, filled with thousands of lustrous transparent emerald-green crystals. The crystals were dispatched to Moscow, Russia, for analysis. However, the mineral's inferior hardness of 5 compared with emerald's greater hardness of 8 easily distinguished it. Eventually, in 1797, the mineralogist Fr. René Just Haüy determined that the enigmatic Altyn-Tyube mineral was new to science and named it dioptase (Greek, dia, "through" and optos, "visible"), alluding to the internal cleavage planes that can be seen inside unbroken crystals.

== Occurrence ==
Dioptase is an uncommon mineral found mostly in desert regions where it forms as a secondary mineral in the oxidized zone of copper sulfide mineral deposits. However, the process of its formation is not simple. The oxidation of copper sulfides should be insufficient to crystallize dioptase, as silica is normally minutely soluble in water except at highly alkaline pH. The oxidation of sulfides will generate highly acidic fluids rich in sulfuric acid that should suppress silica's solubility. However, in dry climates and with enough time, especially in areas of a mineral deposit where acids are buffered by carbonate, minute quantities of silica may react with dissolved copper forming dioptase and chrysocolla.

The Altyn Tube mine in Kazakhstan still provides handsome specimens; a brownish quartzite host distinguishes its specimens from other localities. The finest specimens of all were found at the Tsumeb Mine in Tsumeb, Namibia. Tsumeb dioptase is transparent and often highly sought after by collectors. Dioptase is also found in the deserts of the southwestern US. A notable occurrence is the old Mammoth-Saint Anthony Mine near Mammoth, Arizona where small crystals that make fine micromount specimens are found. In addition, many small, pale-green colored crystals of dioptase have come from the Christmas Mine near Hayden, Arizona. Another classic locality for fine specimens is Renéville, Congo-Brazzaville. Finally, an interesting occurrence is the Malpaso Quarry in and near Agua de Oro Argentina. Here tiny bluish-green dioptase is found on and in quartz. It appears in this case that dioptase is primary and has crystallized with quartz, native copper, and malachite.

== Use ==
Dioptase is popular with mineral collectors, and it is occasionally cut into small emerald-like gems. Dioptase and chrysocolla are the only relatively common copper silicate minerals. A dioptase gemstone should never be exposed to ultrasonic cleaning or the fragile gem will shatter. As a ground pigment, dioptase can be used in painting. Dioptase dust is toxic due to its copper content and accidental ingestion can lead to serious health problems.

The most famous (and expensive) dioptase mineral locality is at Tsumeb, Namibia.

== Crystal structure and properties ==
Dioptase is a cyclosilicate mineral consisting of Si_{6}O_{18} rings which are linked together by Jahn–Teller distorted octahedral d_{9} Cu(II) ions. Each copper ion is coordinated by four cyclosilicate oxygens and two water molecules. Although the copper ions are six-coordinate, they can be viewed as square planar. The copper centers have approximately C_{4V} symmetry. Each Cu(II) shares a square planar edge with another Cu(II) and corners with two more. The copper ions are responsible for the mineral's color and magnetic properties. A broad visible absorption band at 752 nm is observed. Dioptase is anti-ferromagnetic at low temperatures (Néel temperature of 70 K). Above 70 K, it obeys the Curie–Weiss law.

== Gallery ==
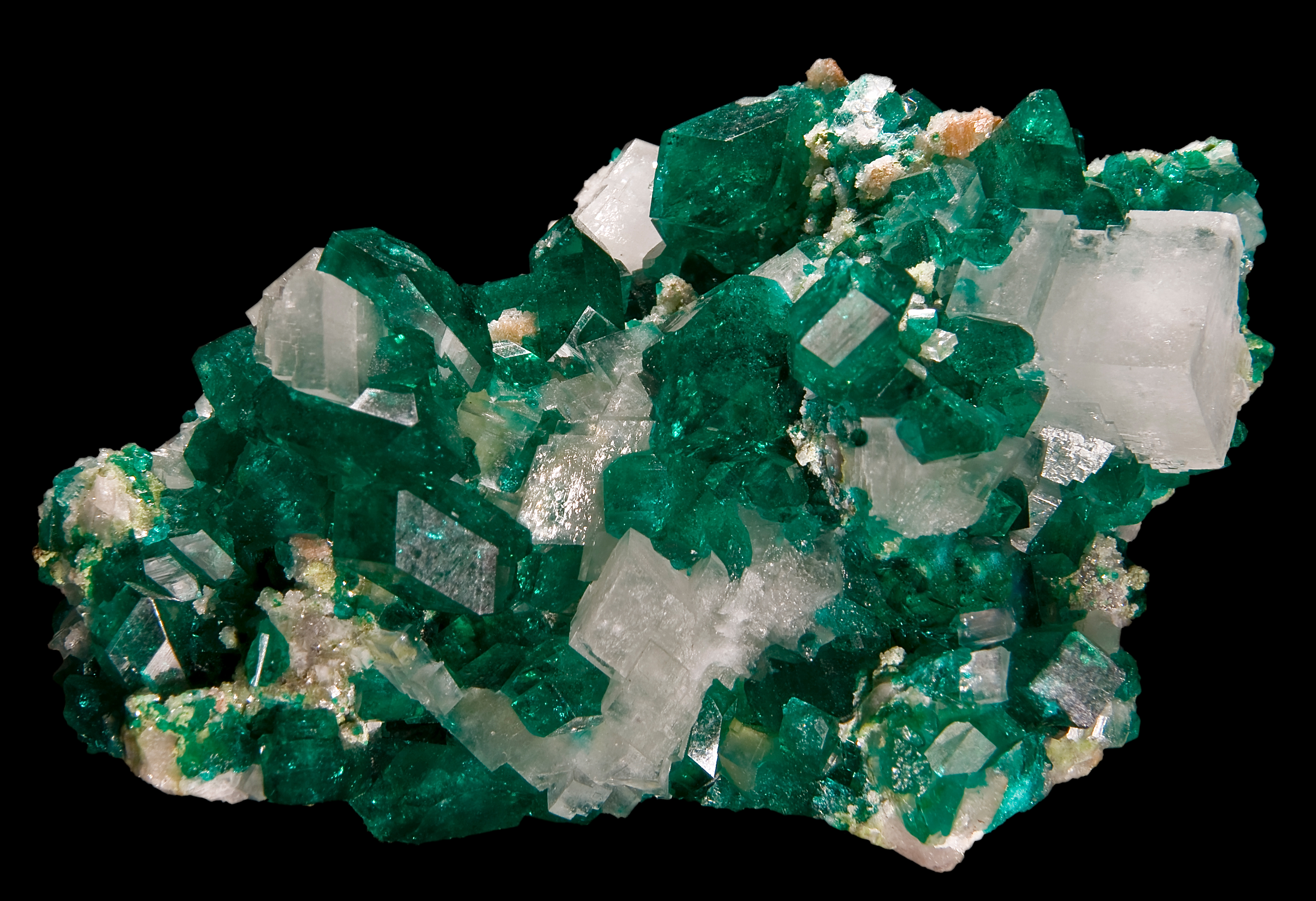
Dioptase from the Tsumeb Mine, Tsumeb, Namibia

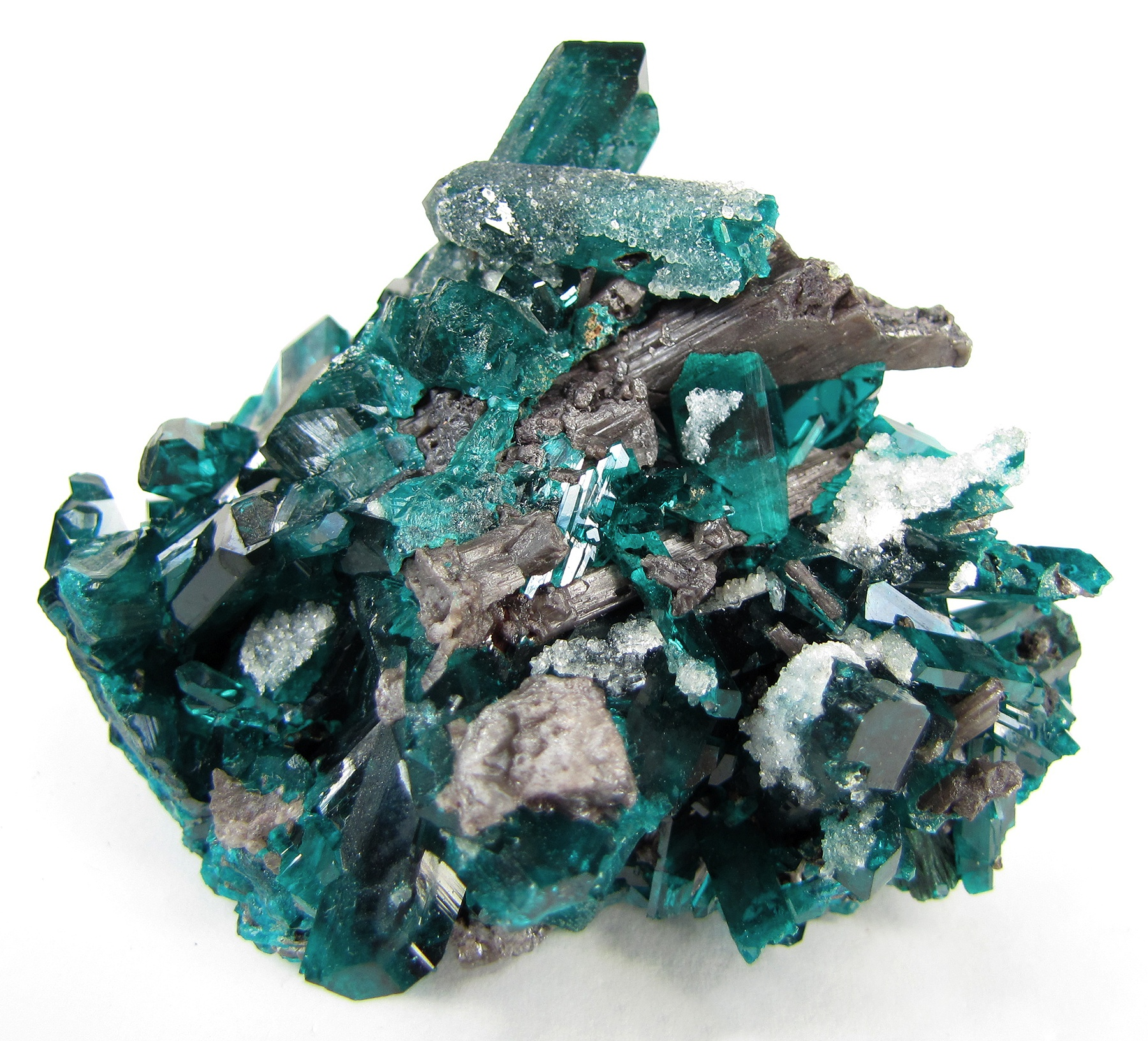
Dioptase with Cerussite, Christoff Mine, Kunene Region, Namibia. 6.9 × 5.7 × 4.8 cm

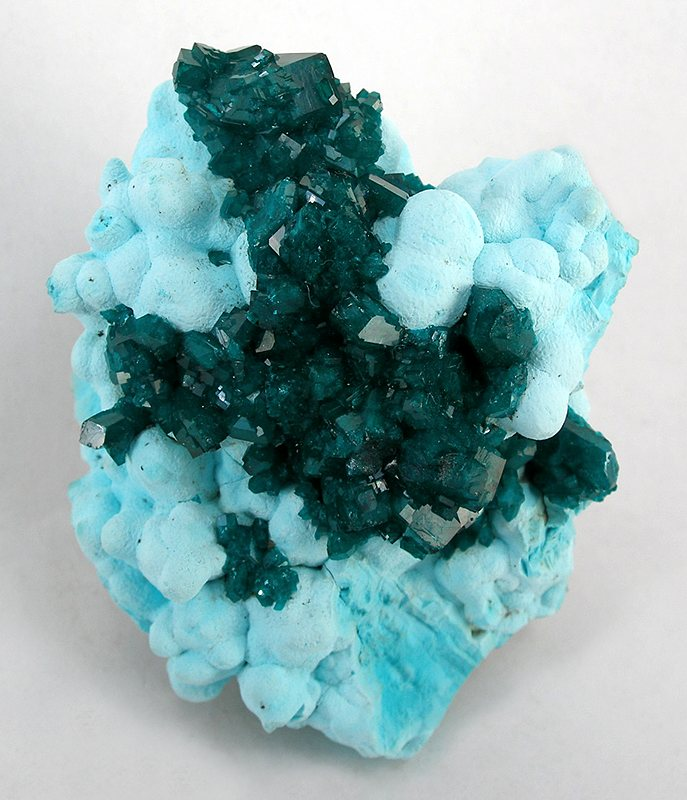
Dioptase on Chrysocolla, Otjikotu, Kunene Region, Namibia. 6.8 × 5.5 × 4.5 cm

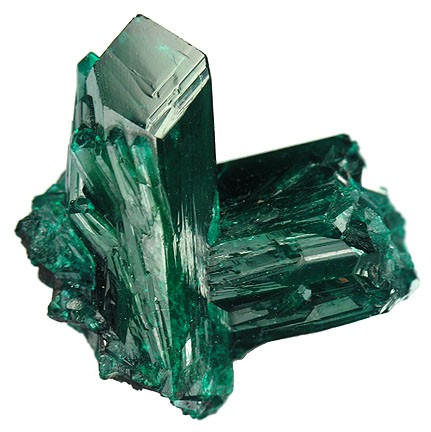
Dioptase crystal, Kimbedi, Pool Department, Republic of Congo (Brazzaville). Size: 2.0 × 1.7 × 1.4 cm

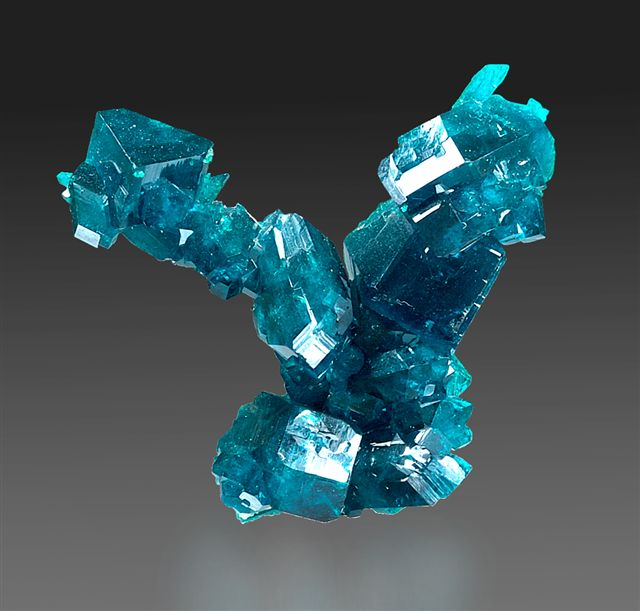
Pristine dioptase crystals, Tsumeb Mine, Tsumeb, Namibia. 4 × 4 × 1 cm

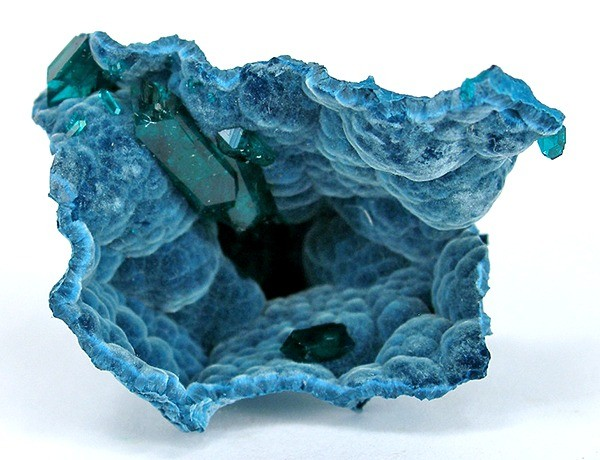
Dioptase on Shattuckite, Kaokoveld Plateau, Kunene Region, Namibia. Size: 2.5 × 2.1 × 2.0 cm

== See also ==
- Aventurine
- Malachite
