= Finlay Limestone =

- Stratigraphic range: Albian
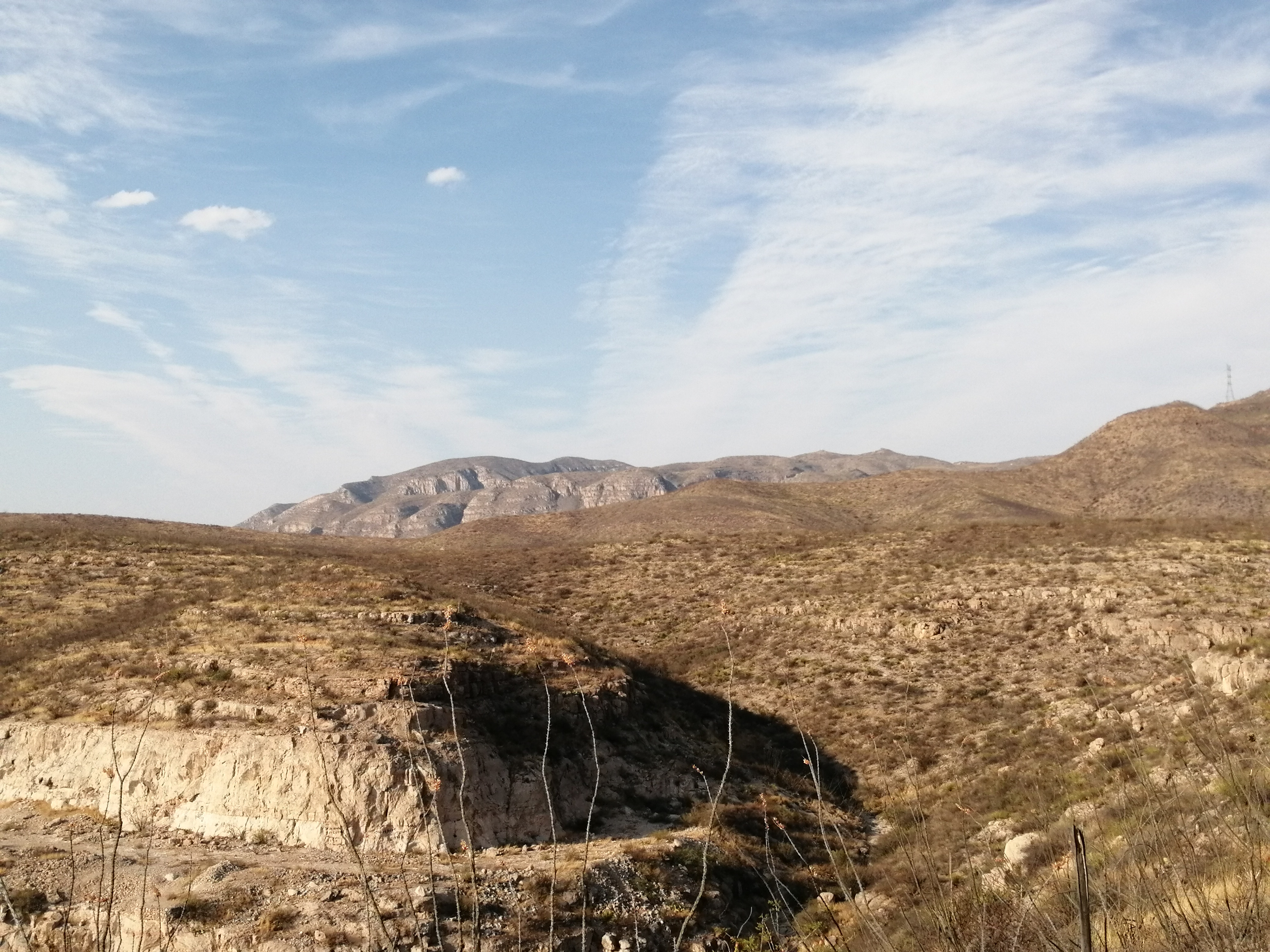
- Limestone mountains of Finlay Limestone in Aquiles Serdán Municipality near Chihuahua City.
- Type: Formation
- Unit of: Fredericksburg Group
- Underlies: Del Norte Formation
- Overlies: Cox Sandstone
- Thickness: 130–426 feet (40–130 m)

Lithology
- Primary: Limestone
- Other: Sandstone

Location
- Coordinates: 31.36°N 105.60°W
- Region: New Mexico; Texas; Chihuahua
- Country: United States; Mexico

Type section
- Named for: Finlay Mountains
- Named by: G.B Richardson
- Year defined: 1904
- Finlay Limestone (the United States) Finlay Limestone (Texas)

The Finlay Limestone is a geologic formation in western Texas, southern New Mexico, and northern Chihuahua. It preserves fossils dating back to the early Cretaceous period.

== Description ==
The formation is composed of massive gray limestone with a few thin beds of brown sandstone, with a total thickness of 130–426 feet (40–130 m). It is exposed in the Finlay Mountains (31.36°N 105.60°W), the Sierra de Juarez, and the Cerro de Cristo Rey uplift (31.787°N 106.546°W). The formation overlies the Cox Sandstone and is overlain by the Del Norte Formation.

== Fossils ==
The formation is highly fossiliferous, containing fossils characteristic of early Cretaceous Albian and Comanchean age.

== Economic resources ==
The formation includes carbonate replacement deposits of lead, zinc, and silver in northern Mexico, along the Chihuahua CRD belt.

== History of investigation ==
The formation was first defined by G.B. Richardson in 1904 and assigned to the Fredericksburg Group.

== See also ==
- List of fossiliferous stratigraphic units in New Mexico
- Paleontology in New Mexico
