= Ljósbjörg Petra María Sveinsdóttir =

Icelandic stone and mineral collector

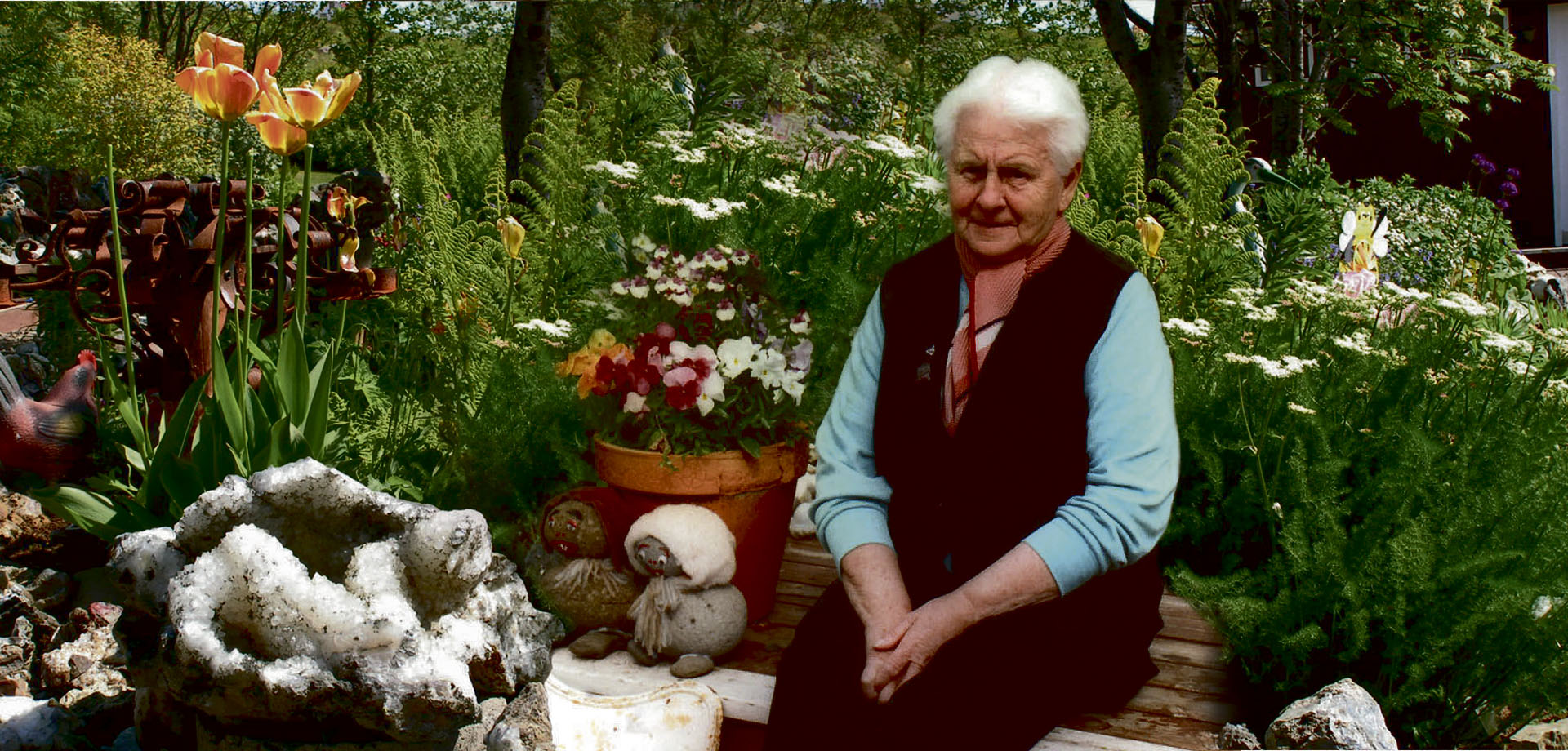
- Born: 24 December 1922; Bæjarstaðir, Iceland
- Died: 10 January 2012 (aged 89); Stöðvarfjörður, Iceland
- Known for: Stone and mineral collection
- Awards: Order of the Falcon
- Website: https://www.steinapetra.is/

Ljósbjörg Petra María Sveinsdóttir (24 December 1922 – 10 January 2012) was an Icelandic naturalist and collector, known for her extensive collection of stones and minerals. Her collection formed the basis of a geological display housed in a museum she established in her home in Stöðvarfjörður, which is among the largest stone collections in Iceland and has become a tourist destination.

== Biography ==
Petra was born on Christmas Eve, 1922, to Sveinn Björgólfsson and Svanhvít Lára Sigríður Pétursdóttir. Between 1913 and 1927, her parents lived in a traditional farmhouse at Bæjarstaðir, where Petra first developed a close relationship with nature and the surrounding landscape. At the age of five, her family moved to the village Kirkjuból (now known as Stöðvarfjörður), where she began to collect stones for drawings and as decorations for tea-parties she would host with her childhood friends.

In 1927, the family moved to the fishing village of Kirkjuból (now Stöðvarfjörður), which had a population of around 80 people at the time. Petra was educated at home by her parents and a travelling instructor until a local school opened in 1933. She was considered a gifted student and showed a strong interest in physical education, storytelling, and literature.

In 1936, she met Jón (Nenni) Ingimundarson after his family moved to Stöðvarfjörður. They married in August 1945 and had four children. While Jón worked primarily at sea, Petra managed the household. He died in 1974 of a heart attack during a trip to Denmark..

== Stone and Mineral Collection ==
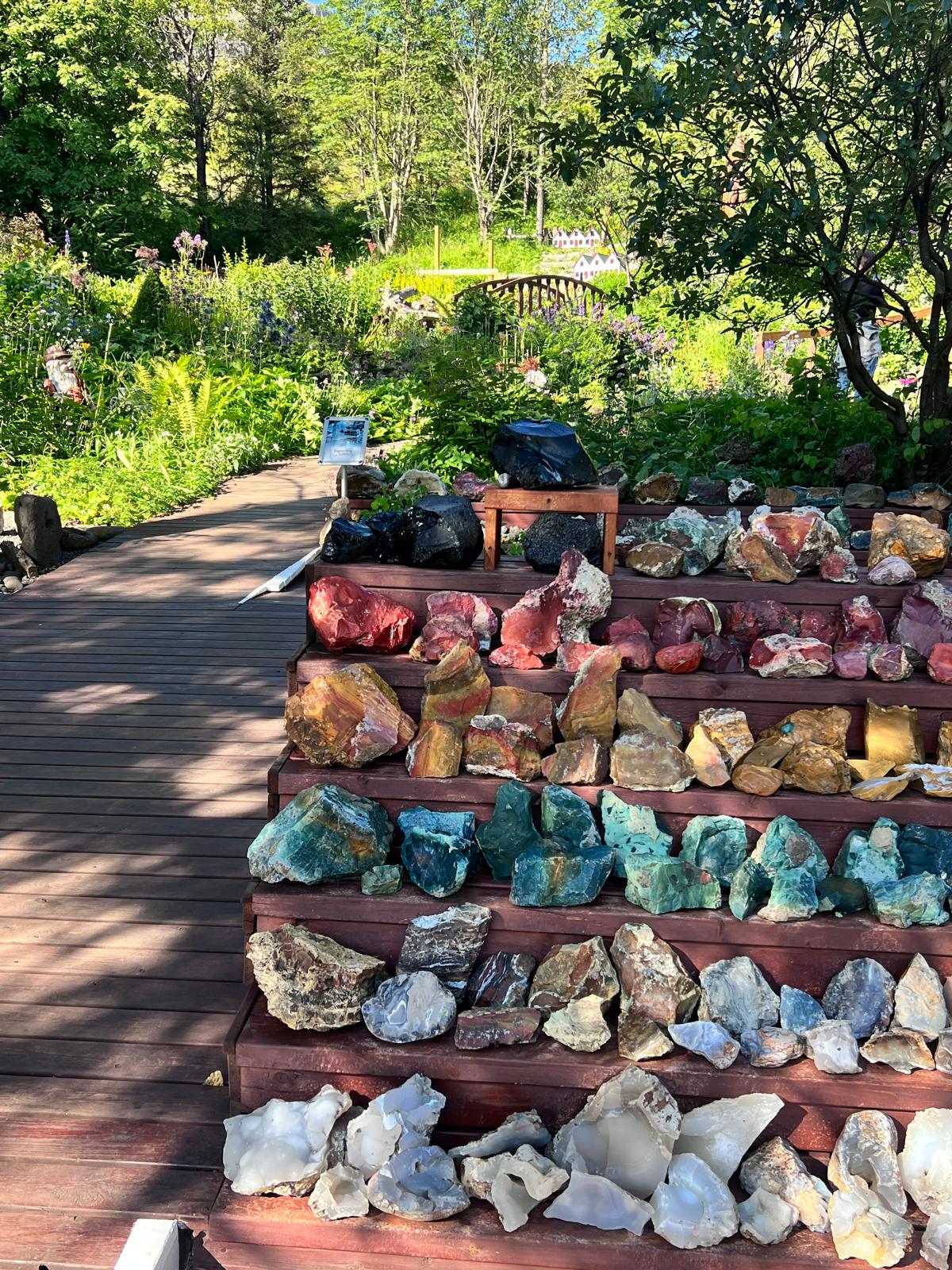
Petra's Stone and Mineral Collection

From a young age Petra was curious about her surroundings and enjoyed walking around the cliffs near her home and looking for special stones. After buying her first home with Nenni in 1946, with space to store her finds, she began collecting more extensively, trekking up the northern slopes of the mountains in Stöðvarfjörður and searching for stones in her nearby area. She gained local recognition for her ability to find distinctive mineral specimens and occasionally guided visitors in the area.

Petra believed that the natural wonders of the mountains belonged to everyone and so, her collection was not only a personal endeavour but a form of community sharing. After her husband's death, she opened her home and garden to visitors. Her garden and house display thousands of stones and have welcomed guests from all over the world.

Over the decades, the museum has attracted hundreds of thousands of visitors, becoming one of East Iceland's most visited tourist attractions. Today, Petra's Stone Collection continues to operate as a public museum, preserving her legacy.

== Legacy and Recognition ==
Petra was widely respected by visitors and locals. Her detailed knowledge of local geology and her correspondence with geologists, botanists, and marine biologists have contributed to a greater understanding of East Iceland's natural history.

Despite her achievements, Petra was known for her modesty. When invited to a special dinner by then-President Vigdís Finnbogadóttir in 1995, she initially declined, remarking, "I got this decoration for my stones and not for myself. It was the stones that were decorated!". She eventually attended at the insistence of her family, and was awarded the Order of the Falcon, the highest civil award in Iceland.

Petra died on 10 January 2012. Her home and collection remain open to the public as a museum, maintained as a tribute to her passion for collection and her contribution to Icelandic cultural and natural heritage.

== See also ==
- Amateur geology § Notable Rockhounds and mineral collectors
