= Mineralientage =

Mineral show held in Munich, Germany

Mineralientage München
- Status: Active
- Genre: Mineralogy, Paleontology, Gemology, Jewelry
- Venue: Messe München
- Locations: Munich, Germany
- Country: Germany
- Inaugurated: 1964
- Attendance: c. 45,000 (2025)
- Organizer: Münchner Mineralientage Fachmesse GmbH
- Website: munichshow.com

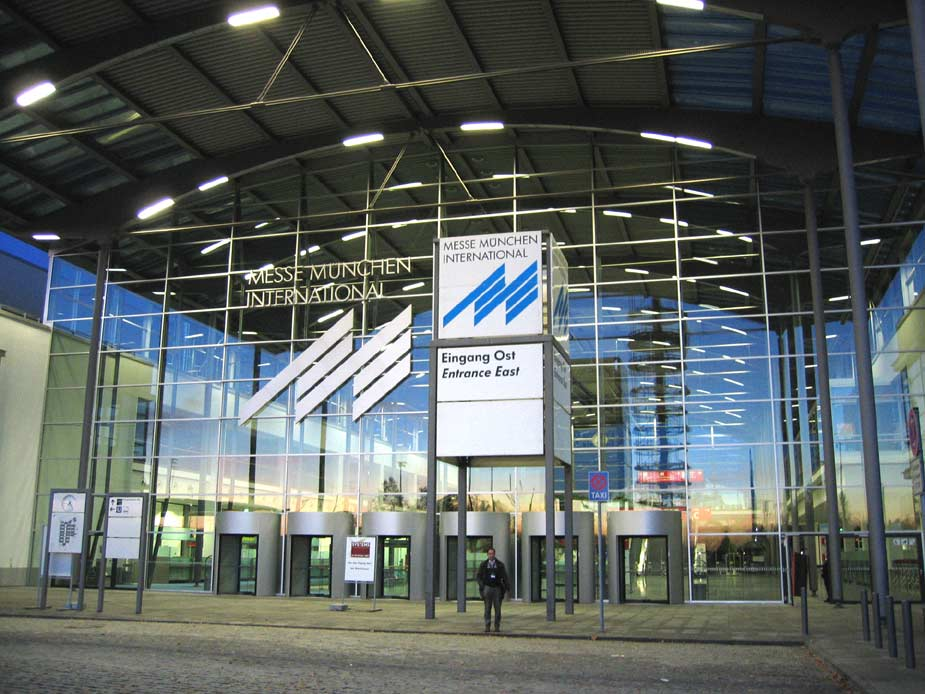
The Main entrance to the Mineral Show

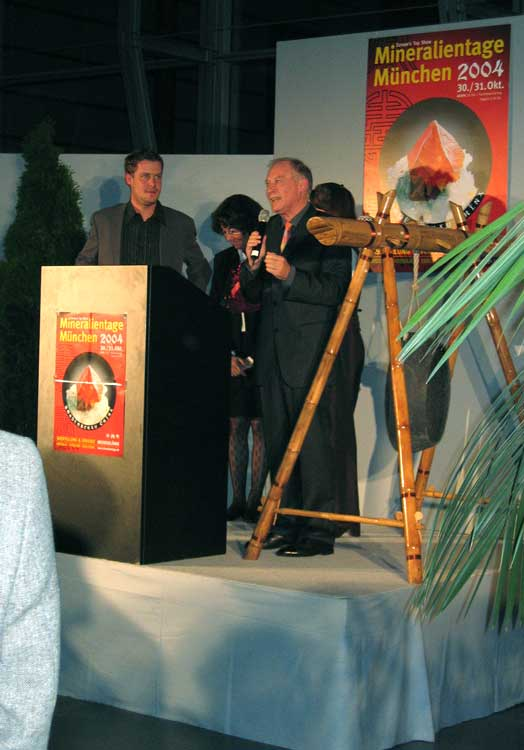
The presentation of a new edition of Mineralientage by the Keilmann's family

Mineralientage München ('Mineral Days Munich') or The Munich Show is the largest mineral show in Europe, held in the Bavarian city of Munich (München), a few weeks after the Oktoberfest. It began in 1964 and celebrated its 50th edition in 2014.

== Overview ==
The fair takes place in late October or early November at the new Trade Fair Center built on the fields of the old Munich airport. With an area over 36,000 m^{2}, it is divided into three pavilions. Over 1,000 exhibitors from more than 50 countries present a variety of minerals, fossils, gems and jewelry.

Every year, the show includes a monographic theme. These have included Earth’s Treasures – The Hidden Wealth of Europe (2025), Opal from Australia (2008), Minerals from the Himalayan Mountains (2007), The Mineral Treasures of the Houston Museum (2006) and The Beauty of Agates (2005). The show also includes other themed exhibitions and conferences.

The three pavilions, of nearly 12,000 m^{2} each, focus on minerals, gems and jewelry. In the central pavilion there is an area exhibiting “super mineral pieces”, known as the VIP area.

Since 2007, there has been a new Alpine Area, where strahlers (mineral hunters) from Germany, Italy, Austria, Switzerland and France display their new finds from alpine mountains like the Mont Blanc massif.

== See also ==
- Mineral collecting
- Tucson Gem and Mineral Show
