= John Sinkankas =

- Born: May 15, 1915; Paterson, New Jersey
- Died: May 17, 2002 (aged 87); San Diego, California
- Occupations: gemologist, micromounter, bookseller, bibliographer, US Navy officer
- Known for: Sinkankasite

John Sinkankas (May 15, 1915 – May 17, 2002) was a US Navy officer and aviator, gemologist, gem carver and gem faceter, author of many books and articles on minerals and gemstones, and a bookseller and bibliographer of rare books.

== Early life ==
John Sinkankas was born in Paterson, New Jersey. He was the son of Joseph Sinkankas and Domicelė Klimas, who immigrated from Lithuania just before the turn of the century. At the age of seven he visited the New Street Quarries in Paterson, where he saw and collected crystals of apophyllite, prehnite, quartz, calcite and other mineral specimens. When older, he would go on field trips with Dr. James Morton, curator of the Paterson Museum, and visited the magnetite mine, abandoned blast-furnances, quarries and mines.

In high school he developed a love of flying, and frequently visited the Teterboro Airport and spoke with early aviators and to see the Fokker aircraft, Gates Flying Circus and others. While still in high school, he made a glider with a seat in the front, but his father did not allow him to fly it more than once. After completing high school, he obtained his BS degree from the New Jersey State Teacher's College, later to become the William Paterson College of New Jersey.

In 1940 he married Marjorie Jane McMichael of Paterson, New Jersey, and had four children: John William, George Martin, Sharon Jane Tooley, and Marjorie Ellen Coates.

== US Navy Aviator ==
Sinkankas graduated from the Naval Air Station in Pensacola, Florida, in 1937, as US Navy Aviator #5390. Before and during World War II, Sinkankas was employed in flying patrol seaplanes engaged in convoy work and anti-submarine warfare in numerous places. Fortunately, he was never shot at. During the course of the war he had an opportunity to fly Colonel Bernt Balchen around Greenland where they visited various colonies along the western coast, including Ivigtut. There Sinkankas collected several flats of specimens from the famous cryolite deposit and elsewhere found rhodolite garnet.

He retired from the Navy as a Captain in 1961.

== Gemology ==
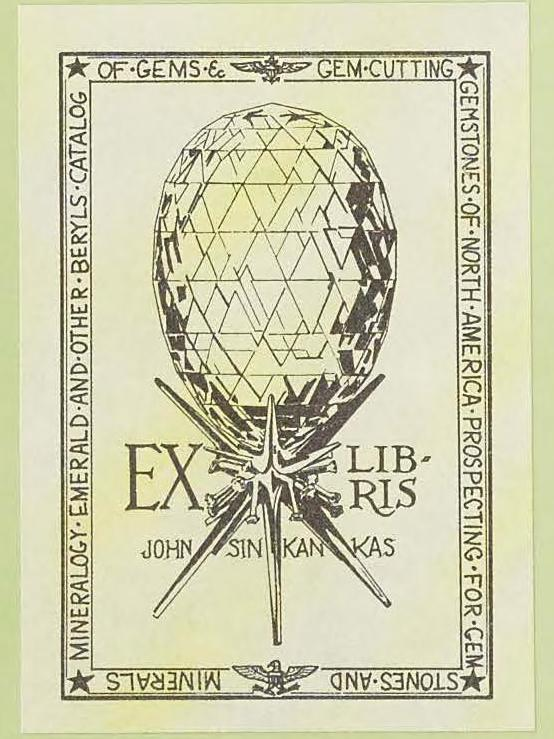
"EX LIBRIS JOHN SINKANKAS" bookplate from a book within his private library

In 1951, the journal Rocks and Minerals revised its column The Amateur Lapidary and asked Sinkankas to be the author. It was this assignment that launched his career in writing about gems and minerals. He became a frequent contributor to the column and also wrote other articles for the magazine; nearly 35 articles appear under his name. To date Sinkakas has published well over 130 papers in numerous hobby and professional journals, including Lapidary Journal, Gems and Minerals, Rock and Gem, Mineral Digest, Mineralogist, Gems and Gemology, Journal of Gemology, American Mineralogist, Mineralogical Record, Industrial Diamond Review, Lapis, Desert Magazine, Bookman's Weekly, Antiquarian Bookman, and others.

Some of his examples of gem cutting and faceting are shown in the Smithsonian Institution. They include a 7,000 carat faceted egg of rock crystal; a cut golden beryl of over 2,054 carats. He also has large faceted gems on display in the Royal Ontario Museum in Toronto and the American Museum of Natural History in New York.

Sinkakas thought of himself as a micromounter. He was listed as such in the International Directory of Micromounters, published by the Baltimore Mineralogical Society, as long ago as the third edition (1966).

== Sinkankasite ==
Sinkankasite, mineral formula H_{2}MnAl(PO_{4})_{2}(OH)•_{6}(H_{2}O), was named after Sinkankas. It is triclinic; as colorless, bladed to prismatic crystals up to 4 mm in length, often as divergent, radial aggregates and as pseudomorphs after triphlyte crystals; occurs in the Barker pegmatite (formerly Ferguson pegmatite), east of Keystone, South Dakota, and in the Palermo pegmatite, North Groton, New Hampshire.

== Bookseller and bibliographer ==
To provide a source of materials for earth scientist, Sinkankas and his wife established Peri Lithon Books company. The company name Peri Lithon is Greek for "about stones". It is in honor of the book Peri Lithon by the Greek naturalist Theophrastus, a disciple of Aristotle, who wrote the first known book about minerals about 450BC.

Sinkankas was also a bibliographer on the history of gems and minerals. He developed the John and Marjorie Sinkankas Gemological Library which was sold to the Gemological Institute of America. Involved in the negotiations were 350 book archive boxes holding some 750 linear feet of shelf space. Included were some 8,000 books and 6,000 pamphlets, scientific reprints, offprints and the like. Altogether, it added over 20,000 new items to the Richard T. Liddicoat Library and Gemological Information Center.

== Honors ==
Sinkankas was a Fellow of the Mineralogical Society of America; honorary Fellow of the Gemmological Association All-Japan; member of the Mineralogical Association of Canada; honorary member of the Rochester Academy of Sciences; honorary member of the San Diego Mineral and Gem Society; and the Cosmos Club of Washington, DC.

In 1982, he was awarded the "Distinguished Associate Award" from the Gemological Institute of America.

In 1982, the Board of Trustees of William Paterson College presented to John Sinkankas the degree of Doctor of Humane Letters.

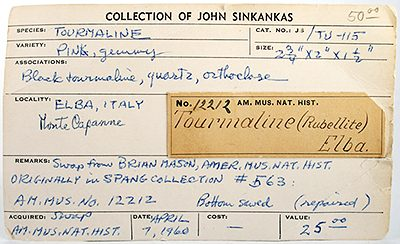
“Collection of John Sinkankas” with American Museum of Natural History tag number 12212

In 1989, he was presented the Carnegie Mineralogical Award.

== Publications ==
- Sinkankas, John (2000). "William Maclure and the Library of the Academy of Natural Sciences of Philadelphia". Earth Sciences History. 19: 33–35.
- Sinkankas, John (February 1999). "What Is Polishing?". Lapidary Journal. Vol. 52, no. 11. pp. 51–56. ISSN 0023-8457. OCLC 1755549.
- Sinkankas, John (1998). Руководство по обработке драгоценных и поделочных камней (in Russian). Moscow: Mir. Russian translation of Gem Cutting: A Lapidary's Manual.
- Schneer, Cecil J.; Sinkankas, John (1994). "Review of Gemology: An Annotated Bibliography". Isis. 85 (3).
- Sinkankas, John (1994). "Collecting Mineralogical Bookplates". Rocks & Minerals. 69 (2): 108–111.
- Miller, Anna M.; John, Sinkankas (1994). Standard Catalog of Gem Values. Tucson, Arizona: Geoscience Press.
- Sinkankas, John (1993). Gemology: An Annotated Bibliography. Vol. 1. Metuchen, New Jersey: Scarecrow Press.
- Sinkankas, John; Koivula, John I.; Becker, Gerhard (1992). "Peridot as an Interplanetary Gemstone". Gems & Gemology. 28 (1): 43–51.
- Sinkankas, John (1991). Bao shi diao zhuo da quan 寶石雕琢大全 [Gem cutting] (in Traditional Chinese). Taipei: Xushi Culture & Education Foundation. ISBN 9789571801421.
- Sinkankas, John (1988). Field collecting gemstones and minerals. Prescott, Arizona: Geoscience Press. Formerly titled Gemstones and Minerals: How and Where to Find Them.
- Sinkankas, John; Read, Peter G. (1986). Beryl. London: Butterworths.
- Sinkankas, John (1981). Emerald and Other Beryls. Chilton.
- Sinkankas, John (1974). Gemstone & Mineral Data Book: A Compilation of Data. New York: Colliers.
- Sinkankas, John (1959). Gemstones of North America. Princeton, New Jersey: D. Van Nostrand Company.

== Bibliography ==
- Burns, P. C.; Hawthorne, F. C. (1995). "Sinkankasite". American Mineralogist. 80: 620–627.
- Mitchell, Richard S. (1986). "Who's Who in Mineral Names; John Sinkankas". Rocks and Minerals. 61 (1): 28–31. ISSN 0035-7529.
- Nassau, Kurt (July 1989). "Dr. John Sinkankas". Lapidary Journal. 43 (4): 42–49. ISSN 0023-8457. OCLC 1755549.
- Peacor, D. R. (1984). "Sinkankasite, a new phosphate from the Barker pegmatite, South Dakota". American Mineralogist. 69: 380–382.
- Wright, Quintin (2003). "Microminerals: John Sinkankas, Micromounter". The Mineralogical Record. 34 (2): 179–182. ISSN 0026-4628.
- Baranauckas, Carla (16 June 2002). "John Sinkankas Dies at 87; Expert on Precious Stones". The New York Times.
