= Micromount =

Micromount is term used by mineral collectors and amateur geologists to describe mineral specimens that are best appreciated using an optical aid, commonly a hand-lens or a binocular microscope. The magnification employed ranges from 10 to 40 times.

A micromount is permanently mounted in some kind of box and labelled with the name of the mineral and the location from which it came. Proper mounting both preserves delicate crystals, and facilitates their handling.

Micromount specimen collecting has a number of advantages over collecting larger specimens.

Micromount specimens take up less space and cost less than larger specimens.
Small crystals are usually more perfect than larger ones.
Micromount material can often be readily collected at locations that rarely if ever yield specimens with large crystals.
Crystals of many rare species are only found in microscopic sizes.

Micromounting is a craft, as much as it is a collecting activity. Two English language books on micromounting have been published, by Milton Speckels in 1965, and by Quintin Wight in 1993.
