= Del Norte Formation =

Geologic formation in New Mexico and Arizona

- Stratigraphic range: Albian
- Type: Formation
- Underlies: Smeltertown Formation
- Overlies: Finlay Limestone
- Thickness: 53 feet (16 m)

Location
- Coordinates: 31.8008106°N 106.5422344°W
- Region: New Mexico
- Country: United States

Type section
- Named for: Rio Bravo del Norte (Rio Grande)
- Named by: W.S. Strain
- Year defined: 1976
- Del Norte Formation (the United States) Del Norte Formation (New Mexico)

The Del Norte Formation is a geologic formation in Mexico, New Mexico and Texas near the city of El Paso. It preserves fossils dating back to the early Cretaceous period.

== Description ==
The formation is divided into two informal members. The lower member is mostly calcareous shale with some interbedded fine sandstone and nodular limestone, while the upper member is fossiliferous medium-gray limestone interbedded with tan shale. The two sections are 44 feet (13 m) and 12.5 feet (3.8 m) thick. The formation lies conformably on the Finlay Limestone and is conformably overlain by the Smeltertown Formation. The base of the formation is a prominent 0.1 meters (0.33 ft) ferruginous sandstone bed that is in sharp contact with the limy mudstone of the underlying Finlay Limestone.

== Fossils ==
The formation contains fossils characteristic of the Albian age. These include bivalves such as grapheids, exogyrids, pectens, and oysters; gastropods; spatangoid echinoderms; ammonoids; corals; sponges; and serpulid worms. Small fossils include dasycladacean algae, ostracods, foraminiferans, echinoderms, and serpulids. Ammonites are present that are characteristic of the Albian.

== History of investigation ==
The formation was first defined by W.S. Strain in 1976, who named it after the Rio Bravo del Norte (Rio Grande).

== See also ==
- List of fossiliferous stratigraphic units in New Mexico
- Paleontology in New Mexico
