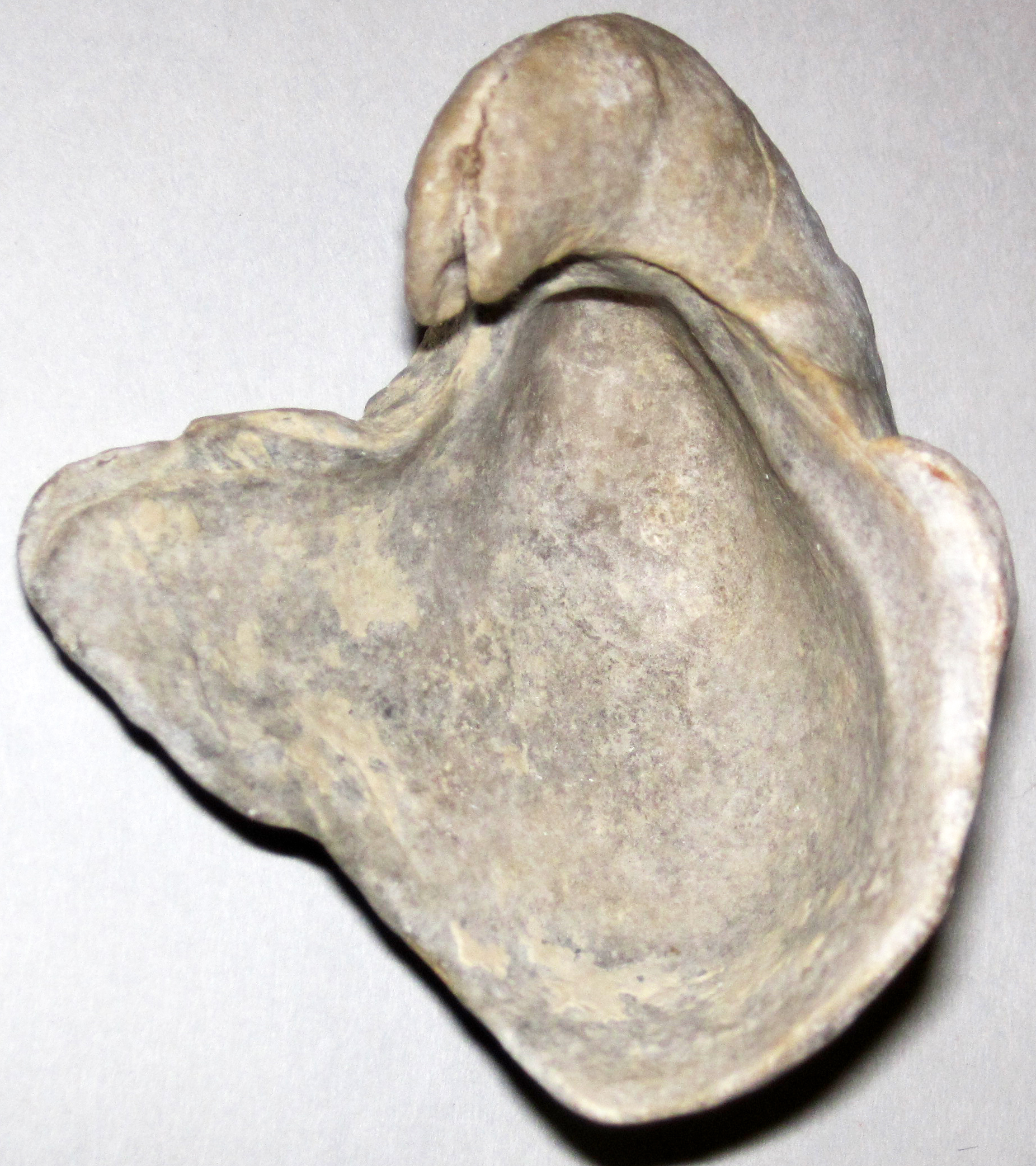
- Texigryphaea mucronata from the Walnut Formation, Lower Cretaceous of Bell County, Texas

Scientific classification
- Domain: Eukaryota
- Kingdom: Animalia
- Phylum: Mollusca
- Class: Bivalvia
- Order: Ostreida
- Family: Gryphaeidae
- Subfamily: Pycnodonteinae
- Genus: †Texigryphaea; Stenzel, 1959

Species
- About 11 species, see text

= Texigryphaea =

Texigryphaea Temporal range: Albian to Cenomanian ~105.3–99.7 Ma

Extinct genus of oyster

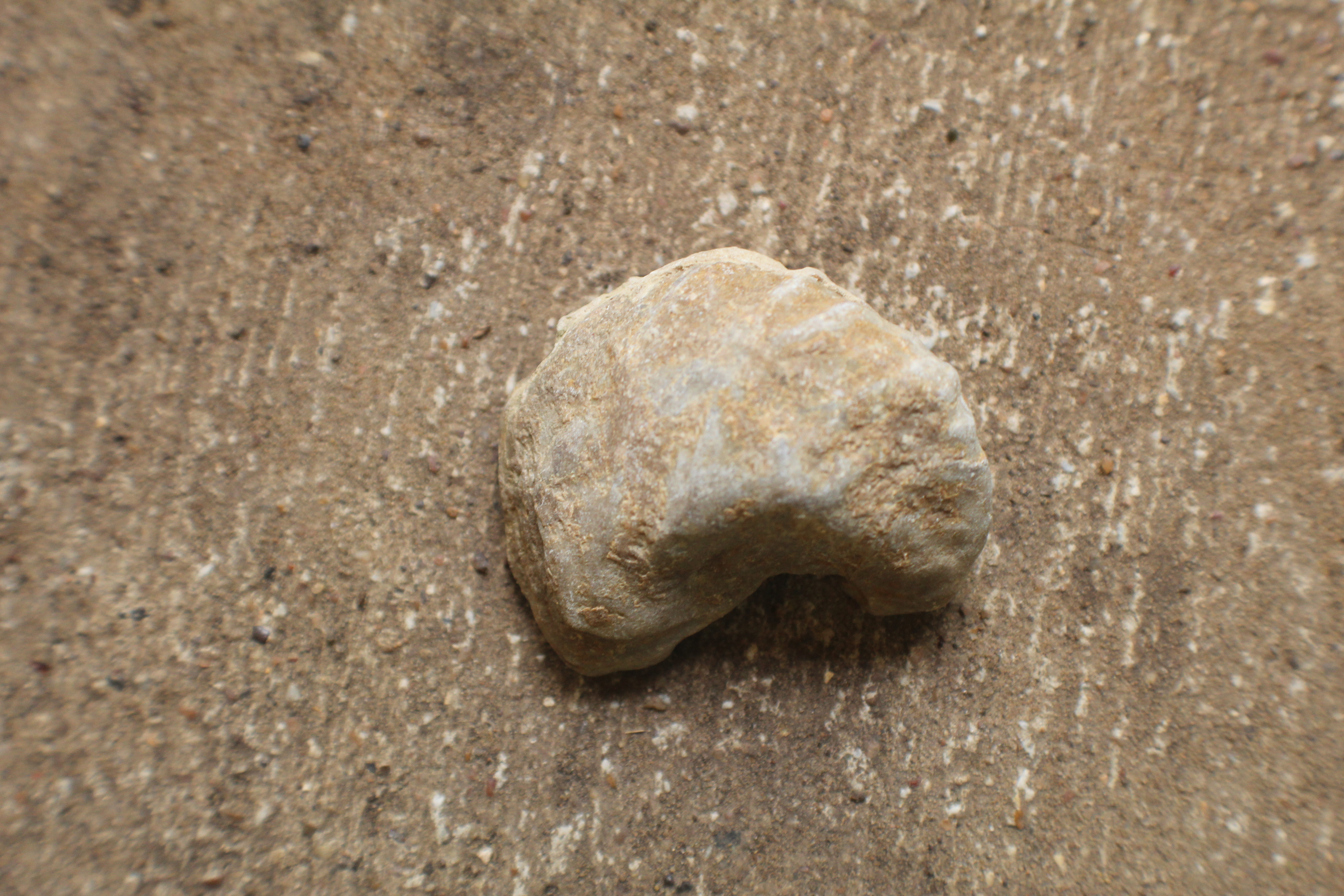

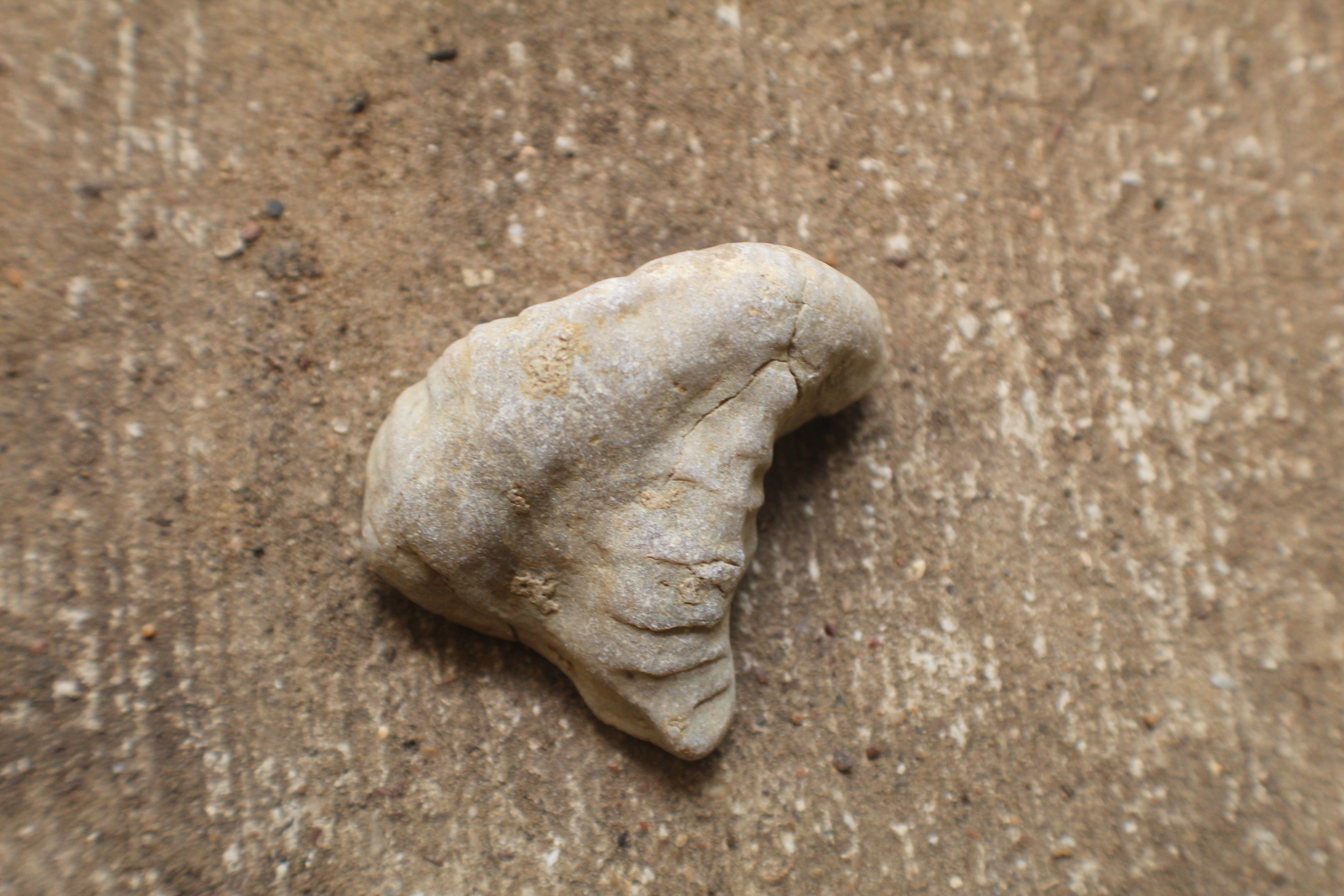

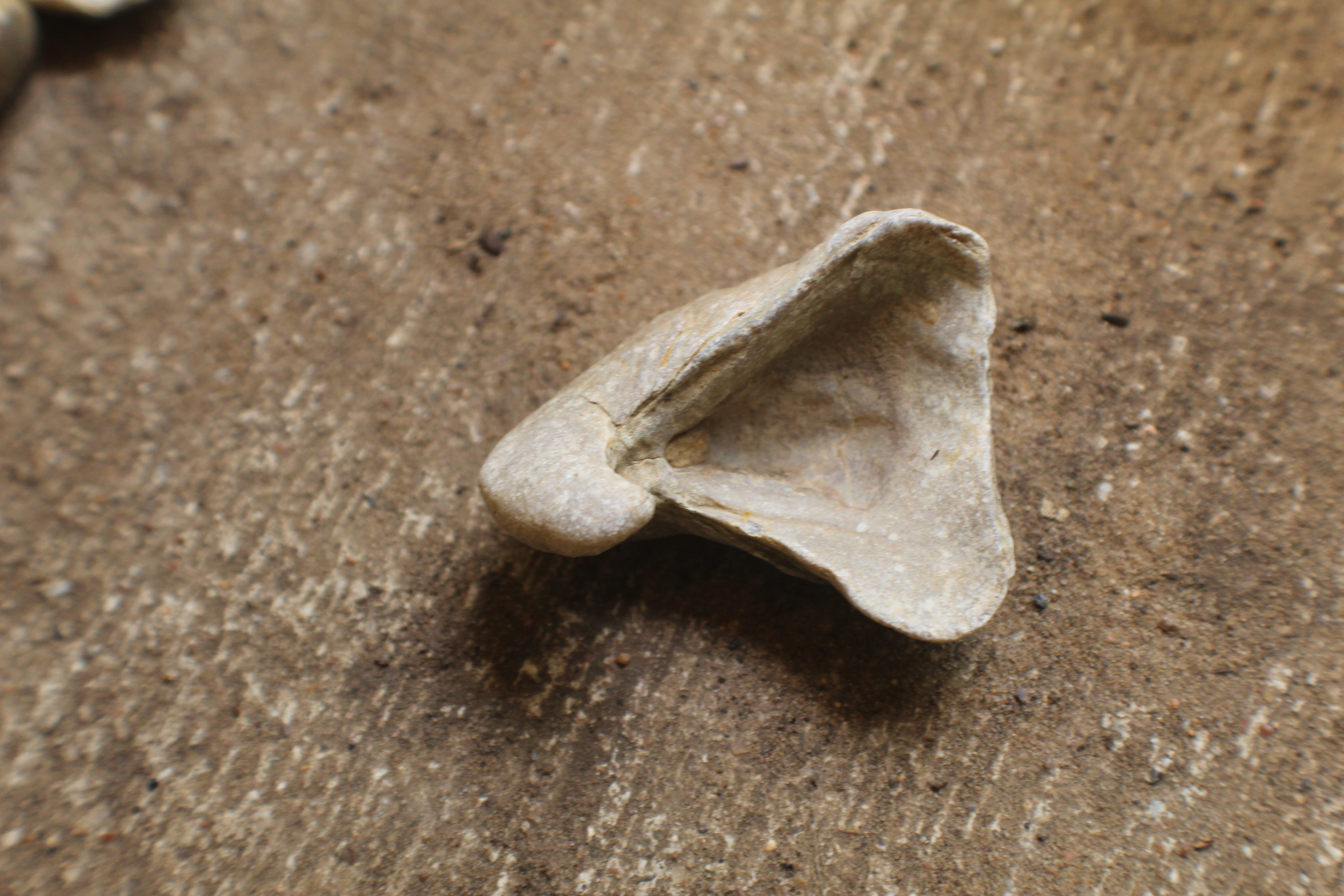

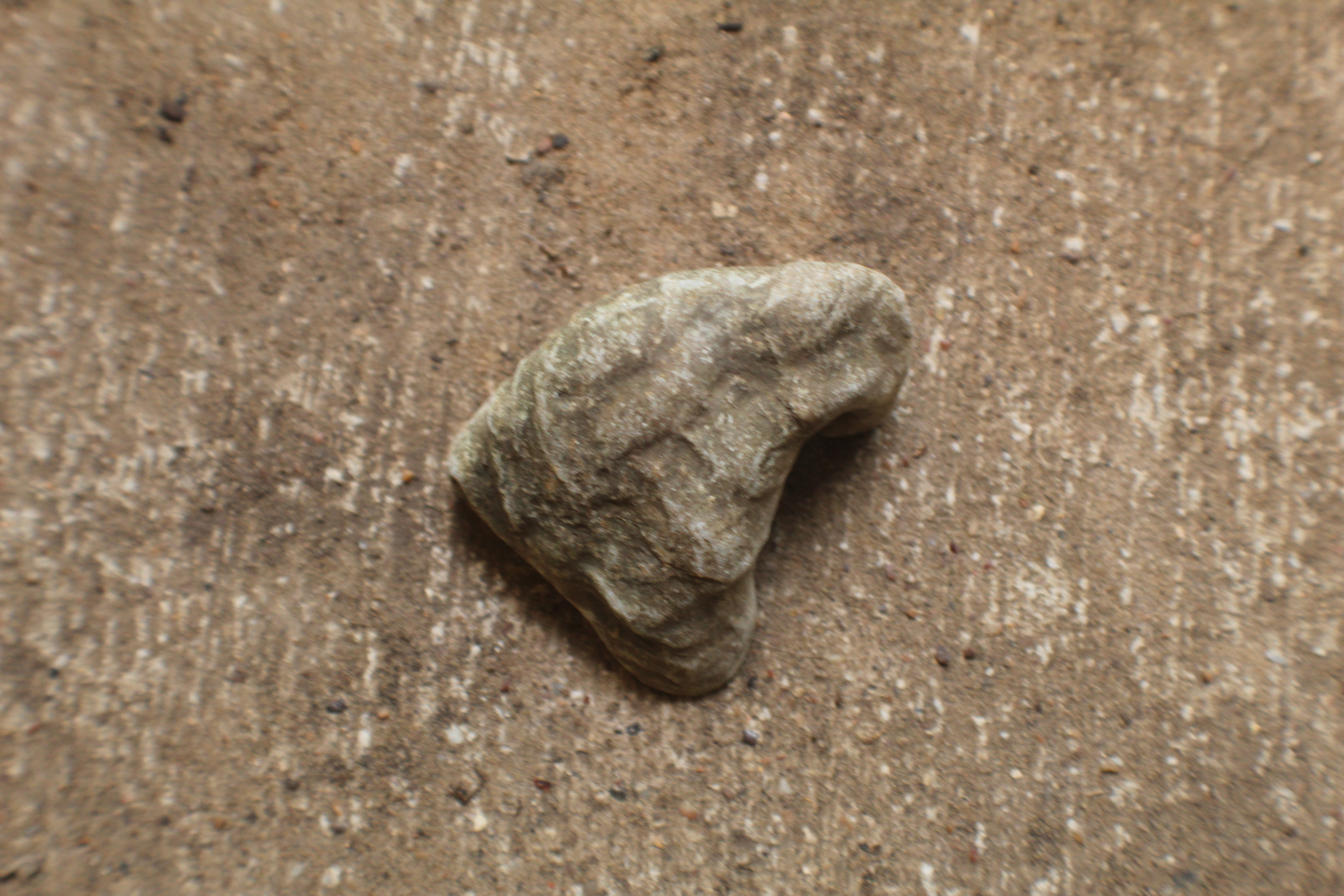

Texigryphaea is an extinct genus of oyster belonging to the order Ostreida and family Gryphaeidae. It dates to the Albian to Cenomanian Ages of the Cretaceous period and is primarily found in Texas and the southern Western Interior of North America. However, specimens have been identified from northern Spain.

The genus were free-living benthic oysters that were often the dominant species in late Albian biomes of the Western Interior Seaway. Some limestone beds of the Muleros Formation near El Paso, Texas, consist almost entirely of fossil fragments of T. washitaensis. Most species preferred soft substrates in quiet environments, but T. navia was adapted to firmer substrates in more energetic environments. The genus differs from Jurassic Gryphaeidae in possessing a vesicular shell structure and chomata (a fine set of parallel ribs found on the inner valves).

T. tucumcarii is considered to be a synonym for T. pitcheri.

== Selected species ==
- Texigryphaea belvederensis (Hill & Vaughan 1898)
- Texigryphaea corrugata (Say, 1823)
- Texigryphaea gibberosa (Cragin, 1893)
- Texigryphaea graysonana (Stanton, 1947)
- Texigryphaea hilli (Cragin, 1891)
- Texigryphaea marcoui (Hill and Vaughan, 1898)
- Texigryphaea mucronata (Gabb, 1869)
- Texigryphaea navia (Hall, 1856)
- Texigryphaea pitcheri (Morton, 1834)
- Texigryphaea roemeri (Marcou, 1862)
- Texigryphaea washitaensis (Hill and Vaughan, 1898)
