= Mesilla Valley Shale =

Geologic formation in New Mexico

- Stratigraphic range: Albian
- Type: Formation
- Underlies: Mojado Formation
- Overlies: Muleros Formation
- Thickness: 210 feet (64 m)

Lithology
- Primary: Shale

Location
- Coordinates: 31.7940792°N 106.5430513°W
- Region: New Mexico
- Country: United States

Type section
- Named for: Mesilla Valley
- Named by: W.S. Strain
- Year defined: 1976
- Mesilla Valley Shale (the United States) Mesilla Valley Shale (New Mexico)

The Mesilla Valley Shale is a geologic formation in southern New Mexico, northern Chihuahua, and far west Texas. It preserves fossils dating back to the Albian age of the early Cretaceous period.

The formation is particularly well exposed at Cerro de Cristo Rey, near El Paso, Texas, where it is part of a thick sequence of uplifted Cretaceous beds that record transgressions (advances of the sea onto land) and regressions (retreats of the sea from the land) of the Western Interior Seaway during the mid-Cretaceous.

== Description ==
The formation consists mostly of dark green to olive clay shale with some thin siltstone beds and highly fossiliferous calcareous beds. It lies conformably on the Muleros Formation and is conformably overlain by the Mojado Formation. Total thickness is 210 feet (64 m).

Lucas and his coinvestigators divide the formation into three informal members and interpret the lower two as a complete secondary deposition cycle and the upper as the base of the next deposition cycle. The formation was deposited on the upper to middle continental shelf.

== Fossils ==
The formation contains at least 20 genera and 23 species of fossils. These include the molluscs Lima wacoensis Roemer, Lima mexicana Bose, Pecten texanus var. elongatus Bose, Pecten subalpinus Bose, Plicatula incongrua Conrad, Ostrea quadriplicata (Shumard), Texigryphaea washitaensis. Trigonia emery Conrad, Helicocryptus mexicanus Bose, and Turritella granulata Sowerby var. cenomanensis d'Orbigny and the echinoderm Heteraster bravoensis (Bose). These are characteristic of the Albian. The formation also contains ammonoids, brachiopods, foraminiferans (especially Cribratina texana), dinoflagellates, serpulid worms, corals, ostracods, calcareous algae, and some terrestrial plant fragments.

The formation also contains invertebrate trace fossils (ichnofossils), which are tracks or burrows left in the sediments. These include Ancorichnus, Arenicolites, Bergueria, Bichordites, Cardioichnus, Chondrites, Cochlichnus, Coprulus, Gordia, Helicodromites, Lockeia, Ophiomorpha, Palaeophycus, Planolites, Protovirgularia, Rhizocorallium, Skolithos, Spongeliomorpha, Taenidium, Thalassinoides, Treptichnus, and a biofilm, Rugalichnus. This diversity of trace fossils was preserved in storm deposits (tempestites) below the wave base. All are typical of the Albian, and the presence of Chondrites and other trace fossils characteristic of low oxygen conditions indicate that the trace fossils were left during an ocean anoxic event, dated to 100.6-100.2 Ma.

== History of investigation ==
The beds making up the formation were first described by E. Bose in 1906 as subdivision 6 of his stratigraphic section. W.S. Strain assigned the name Mesilla Valley Shale to this subdivision in 1976.

== See also ==
- List of fossiliferous stratigraphic units in New Mexico
- Paleontology in New Mexico
