= Sinkankasite =

Phosphate mineral

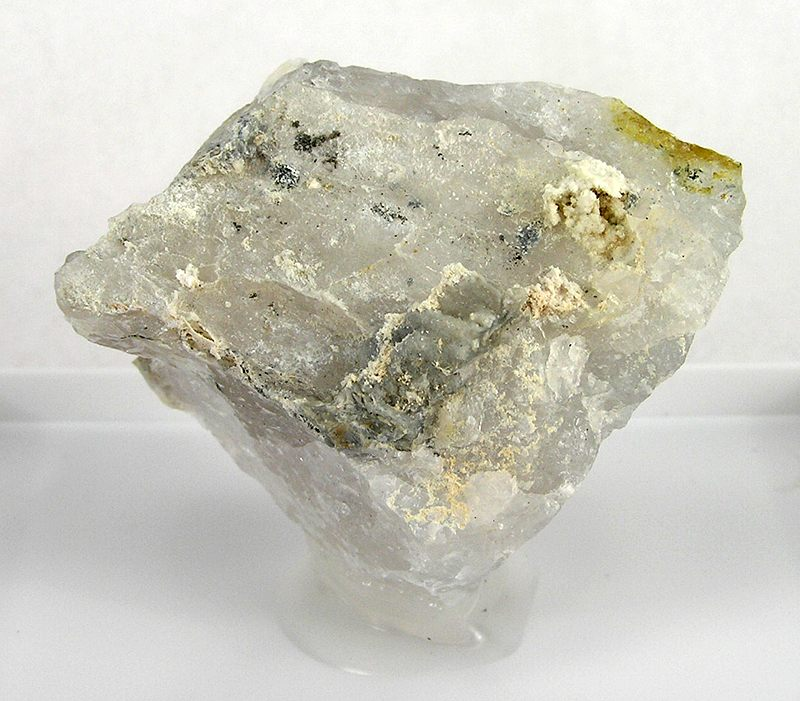

General
- Category: Phosphate mineral
- Formula: H_{2}MnAl(PO_{4})_{2}(OH)·6H_{2}O
- IMA symbol: Ska
- Strunz classification: 8.DB.20
- Crystal system: Triclinic
- Crystal class: Pinacoidal (1̅) (same H-M symbol)
- Space group: P1̅

Identification
- Color: Colorless
- Mohs scale hardness: 4
- Luster: Vitreous
- Diaphaneity: Transparent

Sinkankasite, mineral formula: H_{2}MnAl(PO_{4})_{2}(OH)·6H_{2}O, was named after John Sinkankas (1915–2002), noted author and mineral collector, Scripps Institute of Oceanography. It is triclinic; as colorless, bladed to prismatic crystals up to 4 mm in length, often as divergent, radial aggregates and as pseudomorphs after triphlyte crystals; occurs in the Barker pegmatite (formerly Ferguson pegmatite), east of Keystone, South Dakota, and in the Palermo pegmatite, North Groton, New Hampshire.
