= Smeltertown Formation =

Geologic formation in New Mexico

- Stratigraphic range: Albian
- Type: Formation
- Underlies: Muleros Formation
- Overlies: Del Norte Formation
- Thickness: 193 feet (59 m)

Lithology
- Primary: Shale
- Other: Siltstone, sandstone

Location
- Coordinates: 31.7940792°N 106.5430513°W
- Region: New Mexico
- Country: United States

Type section
- Named for: Smeltertown
- Named by: W.S. Strain
- Year defined: 1976
- Smeltertown Formation (the United States) Smeltertown Formation (New Mexico)

The Smeltertown Formation is a geologic formation in New Mexico, which is particularly well exposed at Cerro de Cristo Rey near El Paso, Texas. It preserves fossils dating back to the early Cretaceous period.

== Description ==
The formation consists of gray shale with some interbedded siltstone and silty limestone, with some fine grained sandstone towards the top of the formation. The total thickness is 193 feet (59 m). It rests conformably on the Del Norte Formation and is conformably overlain by the Muleros Formation.

== Fossils ==
Fossils are uncommon in the formation. However, the rare nautiloid Cymatoceras cf. C. Loeblichi Miller and Harris has been recovered from the formation, as have fossil ophiuroids (brittle stars). The formation is also the type location for the bryozoan Reptomulticava texana. The distribution of foram fossils in the formation (planktonic species more common towards the bottom and benthic species more common towards the top) suggests that the sea in the area was shallowing during deposition of the formation.

== See also ==
- List of fossiliferous stratigraphic units in New Mexico
- Paleontology in New Mexico
