= Amateur geology =

Non-professional study and collecting of rocks and minerals

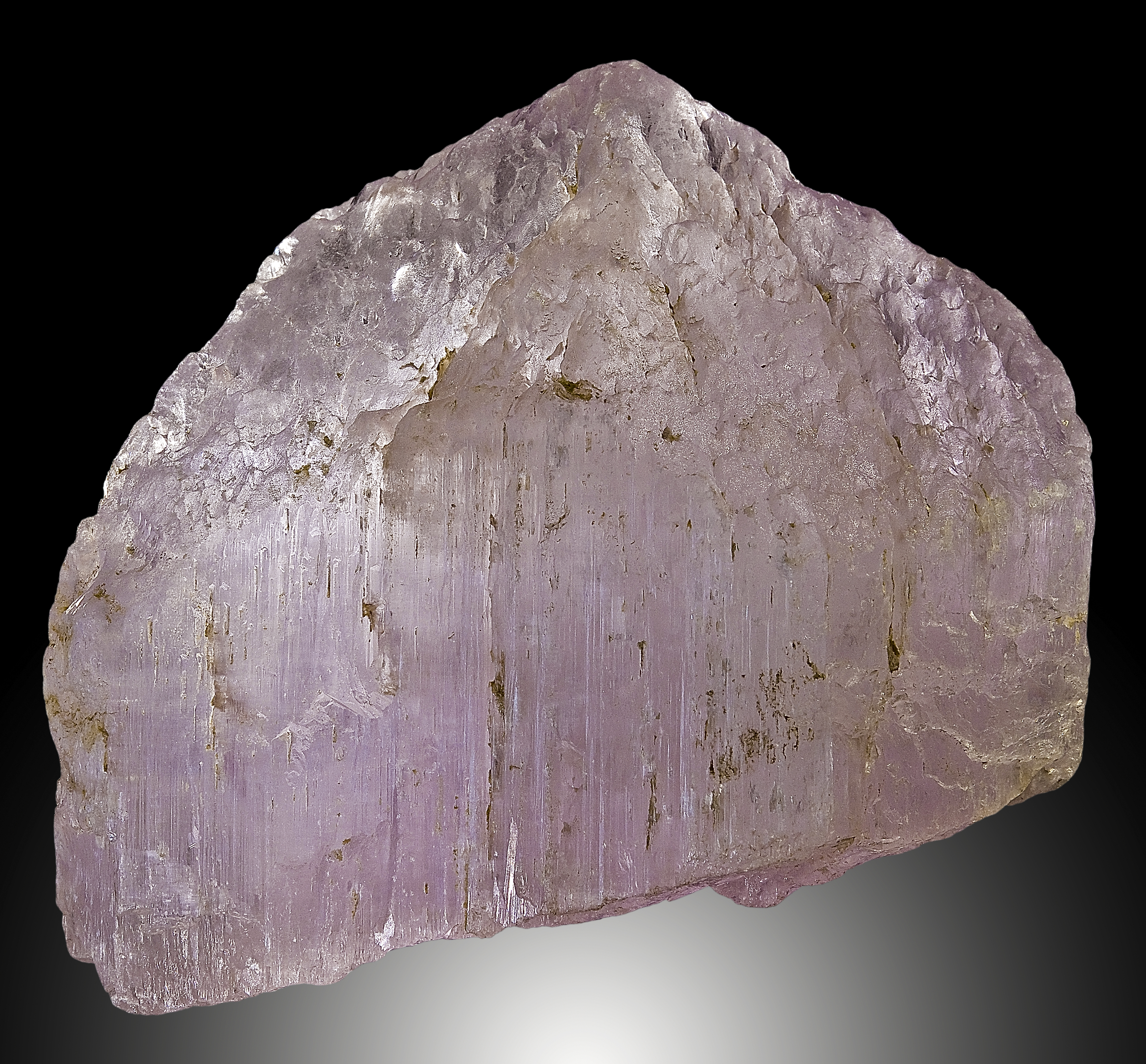
Kunzite from Afghanistan, which was named in honor of George Frederick Kunz

Amateur geology or rock collecting (also referred to as rockhounding in the United States and Canada) is the non-professional study and hobby of collecting rocks and minerals or fossil specimens from the natural environment. In Australia, New Zealand and Cornwall, the amateur geologists call this activity fossicking. The first amateur geologists were prospectors looking for valuable minerals and gemstones for commercial purposes. Eventually, however, more people have been drawn to amateur geology for recreational purposes, mainly for the beauty that rocks and minerals provide.

== Accessibility ==
One reason for the rise in popularity of amateur geology is that a collection can begin by simply picking up a rock. There are people who have formed clubs and groups that search for specimens and compare them with collections from other groups as a hobby. Information on such groups can be found at libraries, bookstores, and "gem and mineral shows". Tourist information centers and small-town chambers of commerce supply valuable local information. The Internet can also be a useful search tool as it can help find other amateur geologists.

== Tools ==
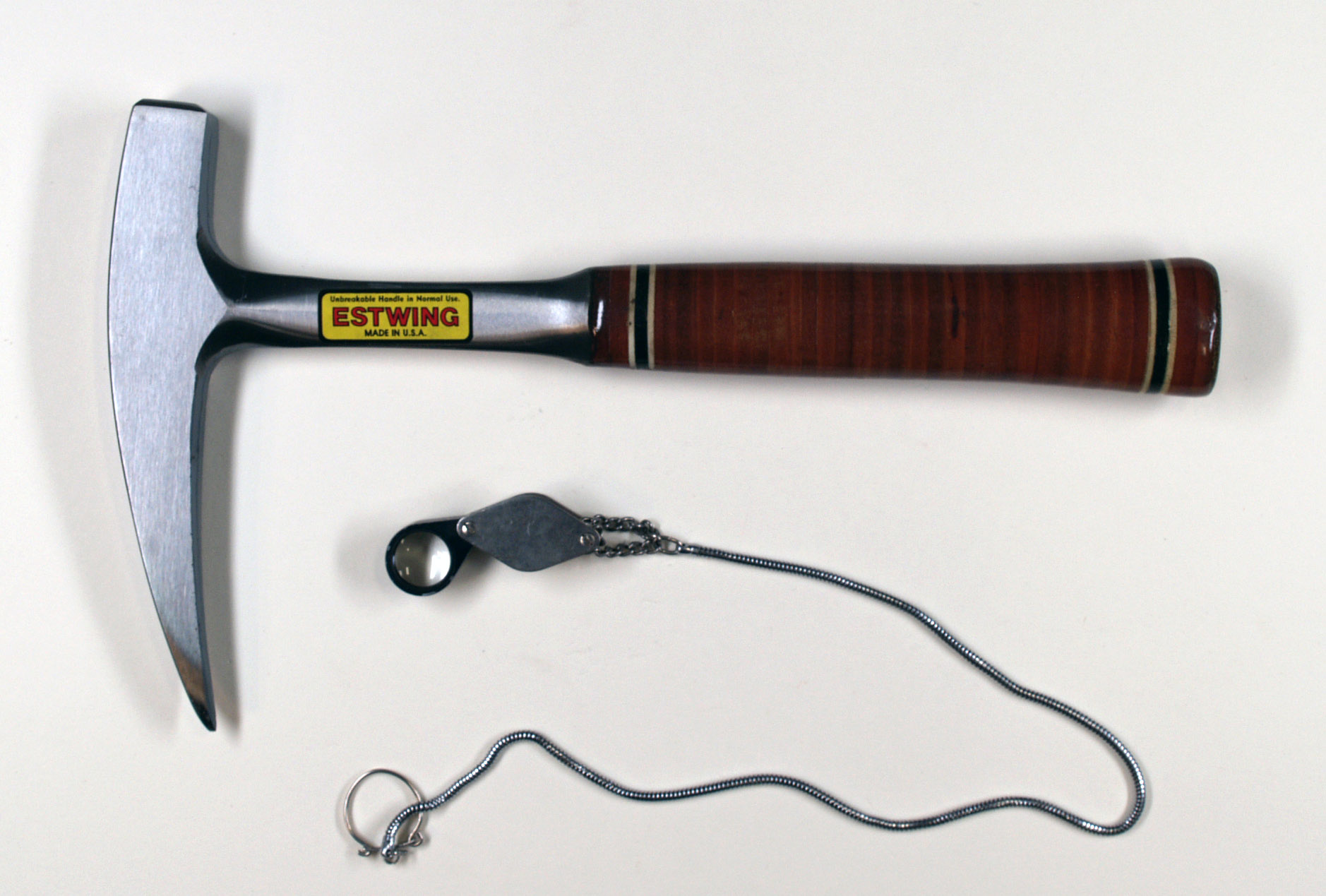
A rockhound's tools: a geologist's hammer and loupe

The amateur geologist's principal piece of equipment is the geologist's hammer. This is a small tool with a pick-like point on one end, and a flat hammer on the other. The hammer end is for breaking rocks, and the pick end is mainly used for prying and digging into crevices. The pick end of most rock hammers can dull quickly if struck onto bare rock. Rock collectors also use a sledgehammer to break hard rocks. Collectors usually search for rocks in quarries, road cuts, rocky hills, mountains, and streams.

== Legality ==
There are many different laws in place regarding the collection of rocks and minerals from public areas, so it is advisable to read up on local laws before prospecting. Rock and mineral collecting is prohibited in most, if not all national parks in the United States.

== Resources ==
Since October 2000, mindat.org has been an important resource for mineral related fields. Its original purpose was to share information about minerals, their properties and where they are found. Today, it is the world's largest public database of mineral information supported worldwide by volunteers adding and verifying new information daily.

== Related fields ==
Avid rock collectors often use their specimens to learn about gemstones, petrology, mineralogy and geology as well as skills in the identification and classifying of specimen rocks, and preparing them for display. The hobby can lead naturally into lapidary projects, and also the cutting, polishing, and mounting of gemstones and minerals. The equipment needed to do this includes rock saws and polishers. Many beautiful crystal varieties are typically found in very small samples which require a good microscope for working with and photographing the specimen.

== Notable Rockhounds and mineral collectors ==
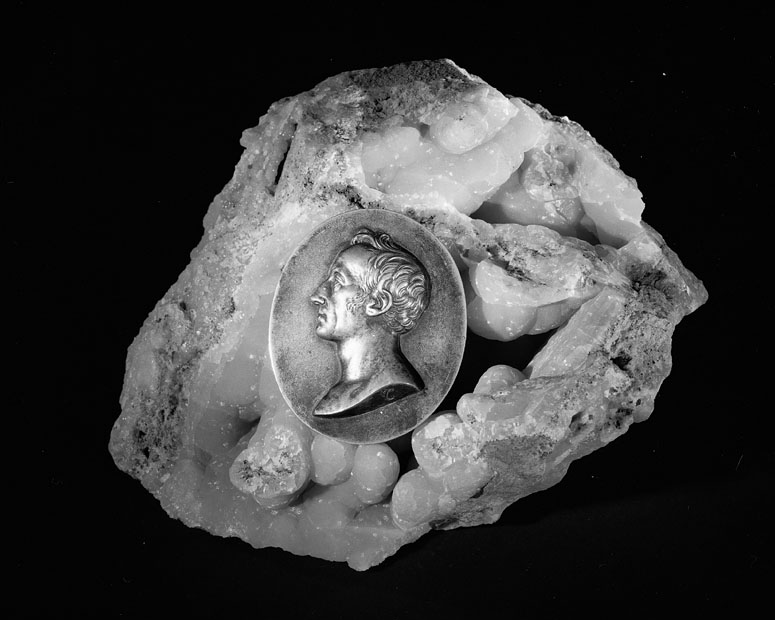
Smithsonite specimen with James Smithson Medallion

- Johann Wolfgang von Goethe (1748–1832) was a German author who was a skilled amateur scientist with a great interest in minerals. The iron mineral goethite is named after him.
- James Smithson (1765–1829) is well known as the benefactor of the Smithsonian Institution in Washington D.C. The Smithsonian now houses one of the largest collection of minerals and gems in the world.
- John Ruskin (1819–1900) was an Englishman, essayist and art critic who gained an interest early in his life for minerals. He authored a small volume of ten lectures on mineralogy titled "Ethics of the Dust". He gave numerous specimens to the British Natural History Museum including the well known Edwardes Ruby and yellow Colenso diamond. This octahedral diamond was a total of 133 carats and was on display at the museum for 70 years. In 1965 the diamond was stolen and to this day has never been recovered.
- George Frederick Kunz (1856–1932) assembled numerous important mineral collections throughout his life, such as a research collection for Thomas Edison. He also assembled the Morgan-Tiffany collection of gems which went to the American Museum of Natural History. He was mostly self-taught in regards to mineralogy and gemology, but his skills and knowledge landed him a position as a gem expert with Tiffany & Company at the age of 23. In 1903 the newly discovered violet pink variety of spodumene was named kunzite in his honor after his death.
- John Sinkankas (1915–2002) was a gemologist, lapidary enthusiast, micromounter and author. He was a fellow of the Mineralogical Society of America. In 1982, he was awarded the "Distinguished Associate Award" from the Gemological Institute of America.
- Ljósbjörg Petra María Sveinsdóttir (1922–2012) was an Icelandic stone and mineral collector whose home in Stöðvarfjörður was converted into a museum of local geology. She received the Order of the Falcon, Iceland’s highest civil honour, for her contributions to Iceland's cultural and natural heritage.

== See also ==
- Fossil collecting
- Geology
- Lapidary
- List of fossil sites
- List of individual rocks
- Mineral collecting
- Rock
