= Muleros Formation =

- Stratigraphic range: Albian
- Type: Formation
- Underlies: Mesilla Valley Formation
- Overlies: Smeltertown Formation
- Thickness: 106 feet (32 m)

Location
- Coordinates: 31.7940792°N 106.5430513°W
- Region: New Mexico
- Country: United States

Type section
- Named for: Cerro de Muleros (now Cerro de Cristo Rey)
- Named by: W.S. Strain
- Year defined: 1976
- Muleros Formation (the United States) Muleros Formation (New Mexico)

The Muleros Formation is a geologic formation in New Mexico, which is particularly well exposed at Cerro de Cristo Rey near El Paso, Texas. It preserves fossils dating back to the early Cretaceous period.

== Description ==
The formation consists of highly fossiliferous nodular argillaceous (clay-rich) limestone at its base and in its upper portion, with shale dominating the middle section and interbedding with the limestone towards the top of the formation. Total thickness is 106 feet (32 m). The formation conformably overlies the Smeltertown Formation and grades into the overlying Mesilla Valley Formation.

The formation is interpreted as an outer shelf formation that later experienced shallowing and deposition of limestone in an inner shelf environment subject to storm influence, then deepened again to deposit shale with some storm layers.

== Fossils ==
The formation contains at least 20 genera and 23 species of fossils. These include the molluscs Lima wacoensis Roemer, Lima mexicana Bose, Pecten texanus var. elongatus Bose, Pecten subalpinus Bose, Plicatula incongrua Conrad, Ostrea quadriplicata (Shumard), Texigryphaea washitaensis. Trigonia emery Conrad, Helicocryptus mexicanus Bose, and Turritella granulata Sowerby var. cenomanensis d'Orbigny and the echinoderm Heteraster bravoensis (Bose). These are characteristic of the Albian age. The formation is highly fossiliferous, with some beds consisting almost entirely of fossils of the oyster Texigryphaea washitaensis.

== History of investigation ==
The beds making up the formation were first described by E. Bose in 1906 as subdivision 5 of his stratigraphic section. W.S. Strain assigned the name Muleros Formation to this subdivision in 1976.

== See also ==
- List of fossiliferous stratigraphic units in New Mexico
- Paleontology in New Mexico
