= Mineral collecting =

Hobby of collecting mineral specimens

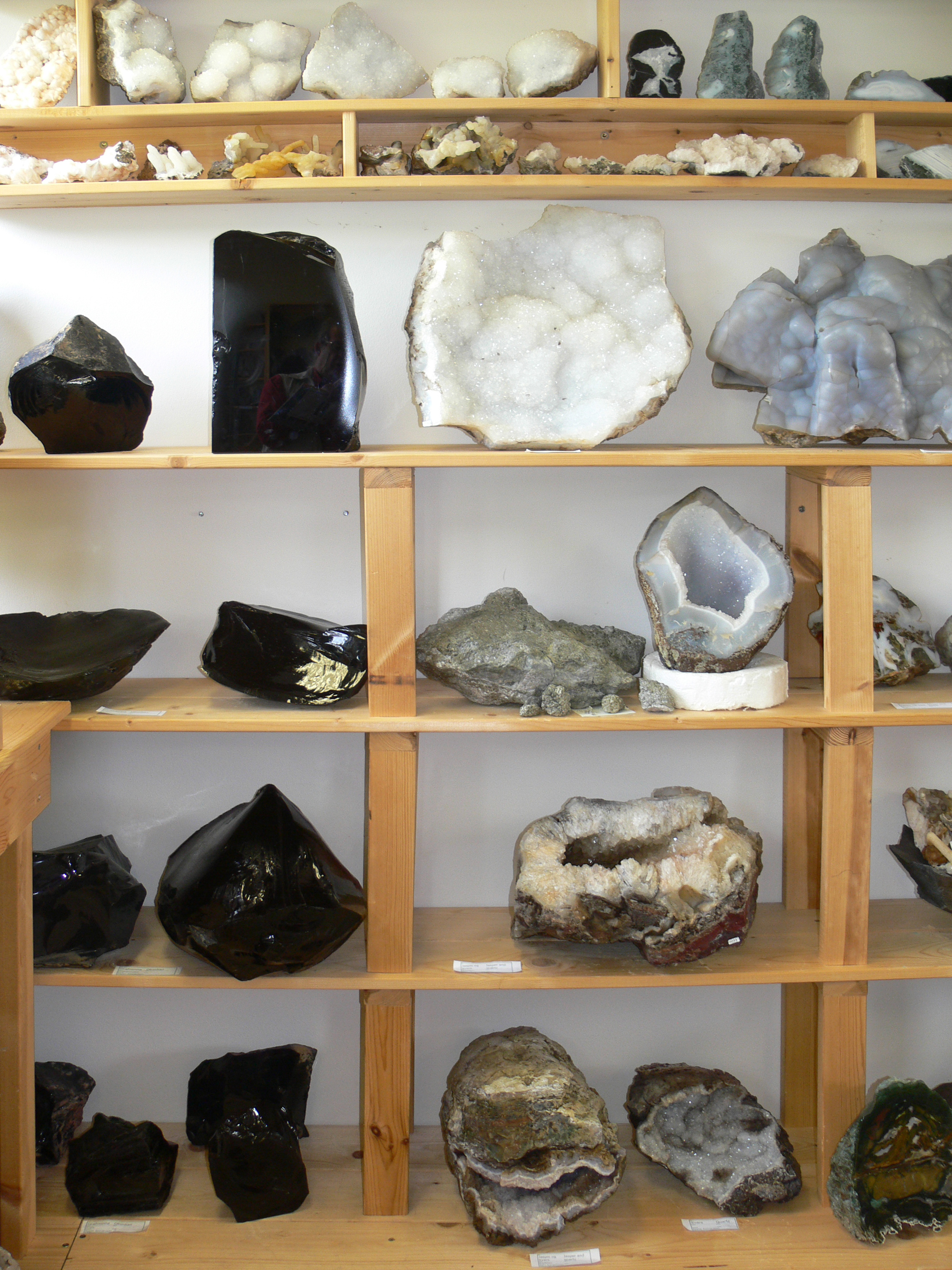
A collection of identified rocks and minerals on display. The black stones on the left are obsidians; the lighter, hollow rocks are geodes.

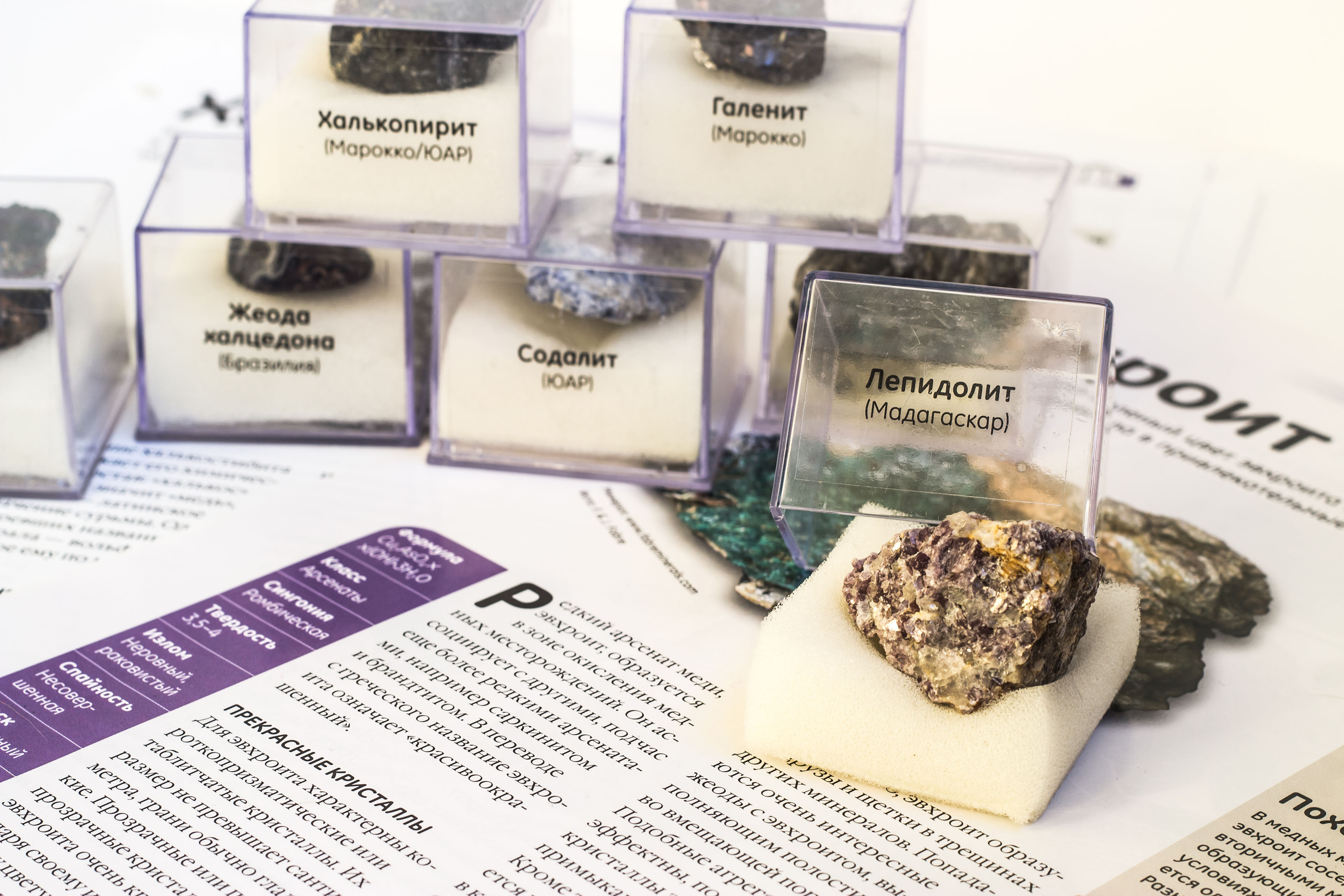
A collection of smaller mineral samples stored and displayed in clear cases

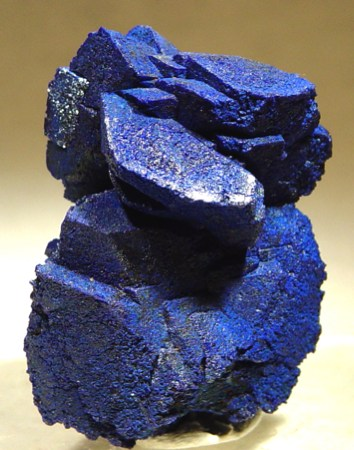
Azurite specimen from the Morenci mine, Morenci, Arizona, USA.

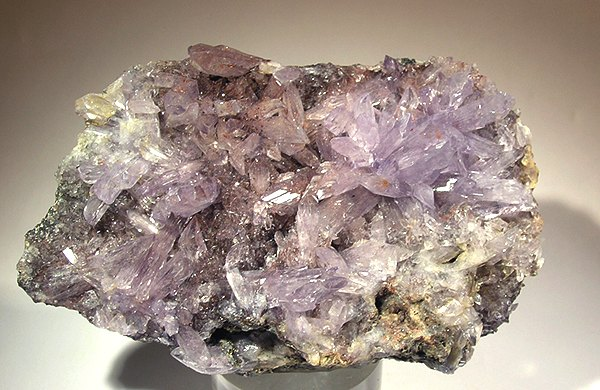
Creedite specimen, 11 x 7 x 3 cm, from Santa Eulalia, Chihuahua, Mexico; formerly in the Perkins D. Sams collection

Mineral collecting is the hobby of systematically collecting, identifying and displaying mineral specimens. Mineral collecting can also be a part of the profession of mineralogy and allied geologic specialties. Individual collectors often specialize in certain areas, for example collecting samples of several varieties of the mineral calcite from locations spread throughout a region or the world, or of minerals found in pegmatites.

== History ==
Generally considered the "father of mineralogy", Georgius Agricola (1494–1555) was also an avid mineral collector. He wrote several books, including two of enduring significance: De Re Metallica, an early treatise on mining, and De Natura Fossilium, the first (1546) modern textbook of mineralogy.

Another famous 16th century mineral collector was Holy Roman Emperor Rudolf II (1552–1612). He built a large mineral collection while employing Anselmus de Boodt (c. 1550–1634), his court physician and another avid mineral collector, to expand and tend his collections. After Rudolf's death his collection was dispersed.

== Motivations ==
Mineral collectors have different motivations for collecting specimens, including personal interest and appreciation of minerals.. Others collect to learn more about mineralogy, the local mining industry and/or local geology. Some simply enjoy exploring the outdoors and socializing and trading with other mineral collectors. Some collectors will go so far as traveling great distances to find the right specimen.

== Specializations ==
As a collection grows, a collector may become more interested in a particular aspect of mineral collecting. Financial limitations or limitations of physical space can also be motivating factors in specializing a collection. Some specializations include:

- Species collecting; trying to obtain as many recognized species as possible.
- A particular locality such as a mine, country, or state/province.
- A particular mineral species (e.g. calcite, quartz, fluorite) or mineral group (zeolites, phosphate minerals) to show the variety within the species/group.
- A particular geological formation, such as minerals found in pegmatites.
- Fluorescent minerals.
- Radioactive minerals.
- Twinned crystals.
- A particular size range such as (from small to large), micromounts, thumbnail (generally fitting in a 1 inch cube), miniatures, small-cabinet or cabinet sized.
- Collecting only specimens that the collector has collected themselves in the field.

== Notable public mineral collections ==
- Australian Museum Mineral Collection, Sydney
- Carnegie Museum of Natural History, Hillman Hall of Minerals and Gems, Pittsburgh, Pennsylvania
- Fersman Mineralogical Museum Moscow
- Gallery of Mineralogy and Geology, Paris
- Geological Museum, London
- Houston Museum of Natural Science
- Mercer County, Ohio District Library (900 specimens on display)
- Mim Museum (over 1800 specimens representing 450 species on display), Beirut, Lebanon
- Mineralogisches Museum Hamburg (1500 specimens on display)
- Musée de Minéralogie, École nationale supérieure des mines de Paris, Paris
- Museo Civico di Storia Naturale di Milano, Milan
- National Museum of Natural History, Smithsonian Gem and Mineral Collection, Washington, D.C.
- Natural History Museum of Los Angeles County
- Naturhistorisches Museum Wien (Vienna, Austria), Mineralogy and Petrography Exhibition
- New Mexico Mineral Museum (New Mexico Bureau of Geology and Mineral Resources), Socorro
- Terra Mineralia, Mineral Exhibition of the Freiberg University of Mining and Technology, Germany, (3500 specimen on display)

== Notable mineral collectors ==
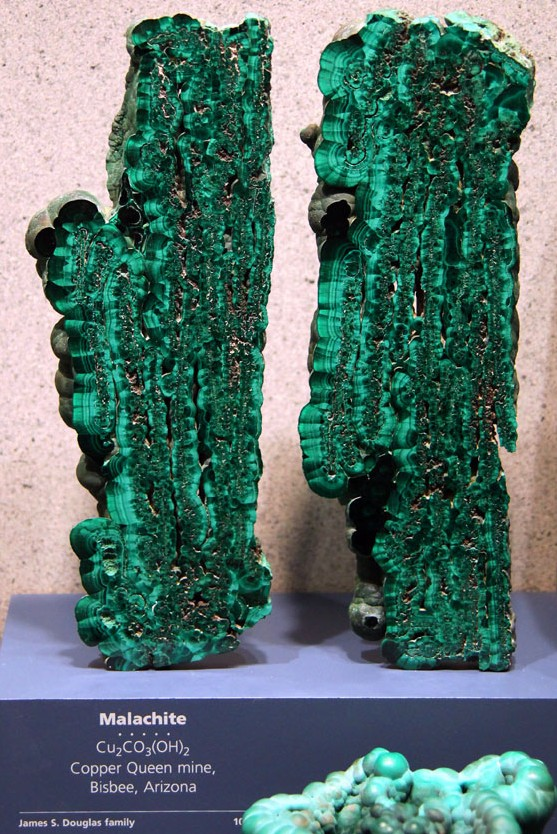
Malachite specimen from the Copper Queen Mine, Bisbee, Arizona. Dr Douglas saved many of the best mineral specimens from the Copper Queen for his personal collection. His family later donated many of them to the Smithsonian.

- Andrew Ketcham Barnett (1852–1914), principal, Penzance School of Mines
- Albert Chapman (collector) (1912–1996); after his death his collection moved to the Australian Museum.
- Dr. James S. Douglas (1837–1918), mining engineer. His collection of classic Bisbee minerals was donated to the Smithsonian's National Museum of Natural History.
- Walter Frederick Ferrier (1865–1950), Canadian geologist and mining engineer
- Jack Halpern (collector) (born 1920), collection reviewed in Mineralogical Record
- William W. Jefferis (1820–1906), banker whose vast mineral collection was acquired by the Carnegie Museum of Natural History in 1905
- George Frederick Kunz (1856–1932), gentleman scientist, VP of Tiffany & Co., "special agent" for the US Geological Survey (1883–1909)
- William F. Larson (born 1945), Founder of Pala International, board of San Diego Natural History Museum, owner Sinkankas Library
- Gene Meieran (born 1937), 2nd Sr Intel Fellow (after the inventor of the microprocessor), 2003 Carnegie Mineralogical Award winner. Collection also at A. E. Seaman Mineral Museum.
- J. P. Morgan (1837–1913), famous international banker. Morganite was named after him by G.F. Kunz.
- E. Pohl-Ströher (1919-2016), German business executive and heiress, collected for more than 60 years. She permanently loaned her collection to TU Bergakademie Freiberg, Germany.
- Perkins D. Sams (1927–2010), West Texas oilman. After death collection moved to Houston Museum of Natural Science.
- Stephen Smale (born 1930), Professor in mathematics, UC Berkeley. World's best Chinese mineral collection published in book. Appraised Houston Museum of Natural Science collection.
- Abraham Gottlob Werner (1749–1817), pioneering German geologist
- Henrietta Clive, Countess of Powis (1758–1830), one of the first female mineral collectors in the United Kingdom, whose well-organised collection is now part of National Museum Wales.
- Hank Schrader (fictional character), brother-in-law of Walter White, from the critically-acclaimed television show Breaking Bad.

The website of Mineralogical Record magazine includes a Biographical Archive containing biographical sketches of approximately 1,800 (as of 2016) mineral collectors and specimen dealers, most of whom were or are active between the late 19th century and the present day.

== See also ==
- Amateur geology, also called rock collecting or rockhounding
- Fossil collecting
- Lapidary
- Lapidary club
- List of minerals
- Tucson Gem and Mineral Show, the world's largest
- Mineralientage, the Munich Mineral Show, Europe's largest
