= Santa Eulalia, Chihuahua =

Town in the Mexican state of Chihuahua

Santa Eulalia
- Town
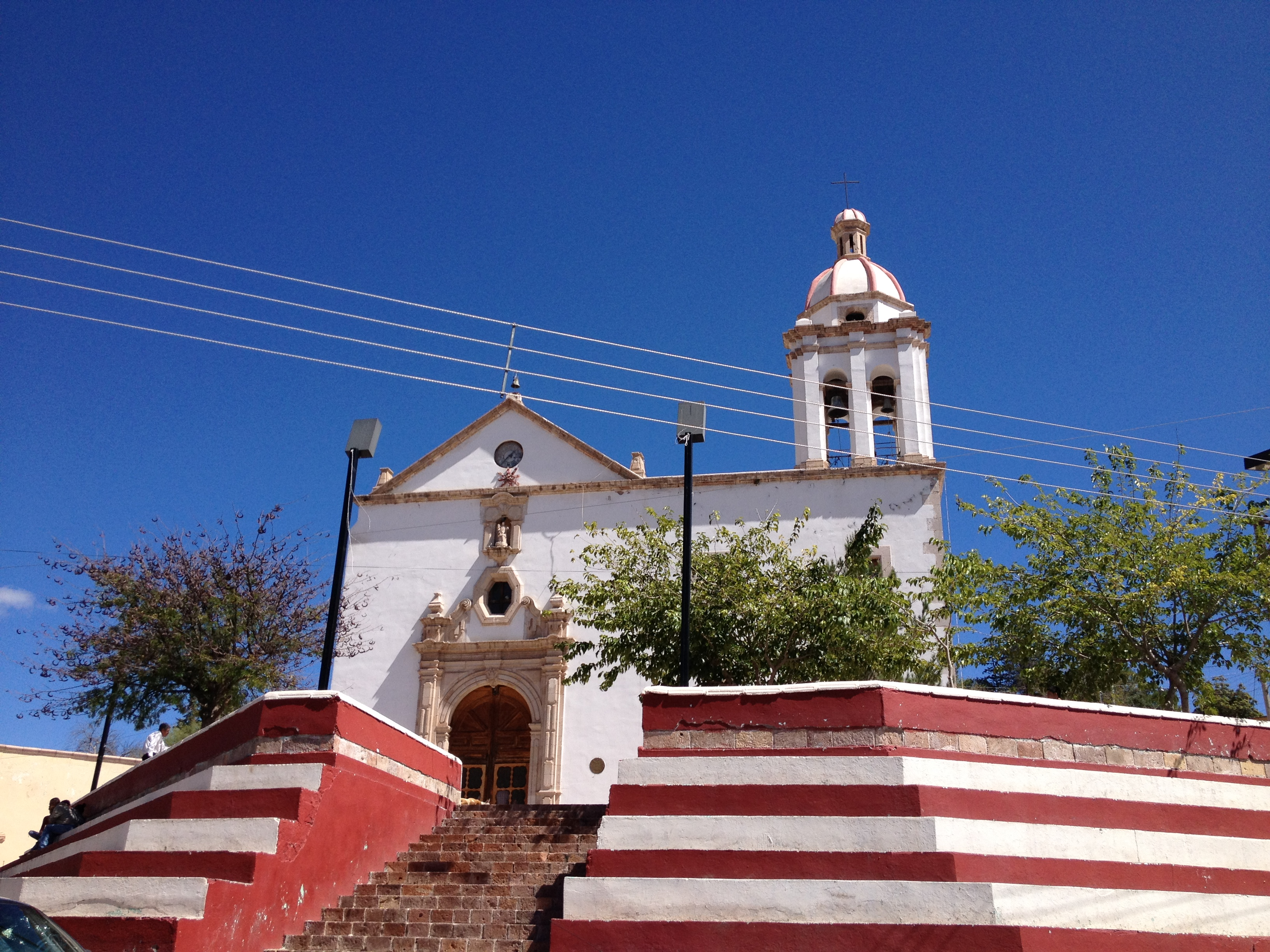

- Location in Mexico
- Coordinates: 28°35′38″N 105°53′16″W
- Country: Mexico
- State: Chihuahua
- Municipality: Aquiles Serdán
- Founded: 1652
- Elevation: 1,700 m (5,600 ft)

Population (2010)
  - Total: 7,135
- Postal code: 31650
- Area code: 614
- Demonym: Santaeulaliense

Santa Eulalia is a town and seat of the municipality of Aquiles Serdán, in the northern Mexican state of Chihuahua. In 2010, the town had a population of 7,135, up from 2,089 in 2005.

Founded in 1652 by Diego del Castillo, it is one of the oldest settlements in the state.

Mining began in the Santa Eulalia Mining District in the early 18th century. Early production was primarily silver. More recently, the mines have produced zinc and lead. Production has been intermittent since the 1990s.
