= Aquiles Serdán Municipality =

Municipality in the Mexican state of Chihuahua

Aquiles Serdán
- Municipality
- Municipality of Aquiles Serdán in Chihuahua

- Location in Mexico
- Coordinates: 28°36′N 105°53′W
- Country: Mexico
- State: Chihuahua
- Municipal seat: Santa Eulalia

Area
  - Total: 651.1 km^{2} (251.4 sq mi)

Population (2010)
  - Total: 10,688

Aquiles Serdán is one of the 67 municipalities of Chihuahua, in northern Mexico. The municipal seat lies at Santa Eulalia. The municipality covers an area of 651.1 km^{2}.

As of 2010, the municipality had a total population of 10,688, up from 3,742 as of 2005.

The municipality had 82 localities, the largest of which (with 2010 populations in parentheses) were: Santa Eulalia (7,135), classified as urban, and Ninguno (CERESO) (2,010), classified as rural.
