= Cornubite =

Copper arsenate mineral

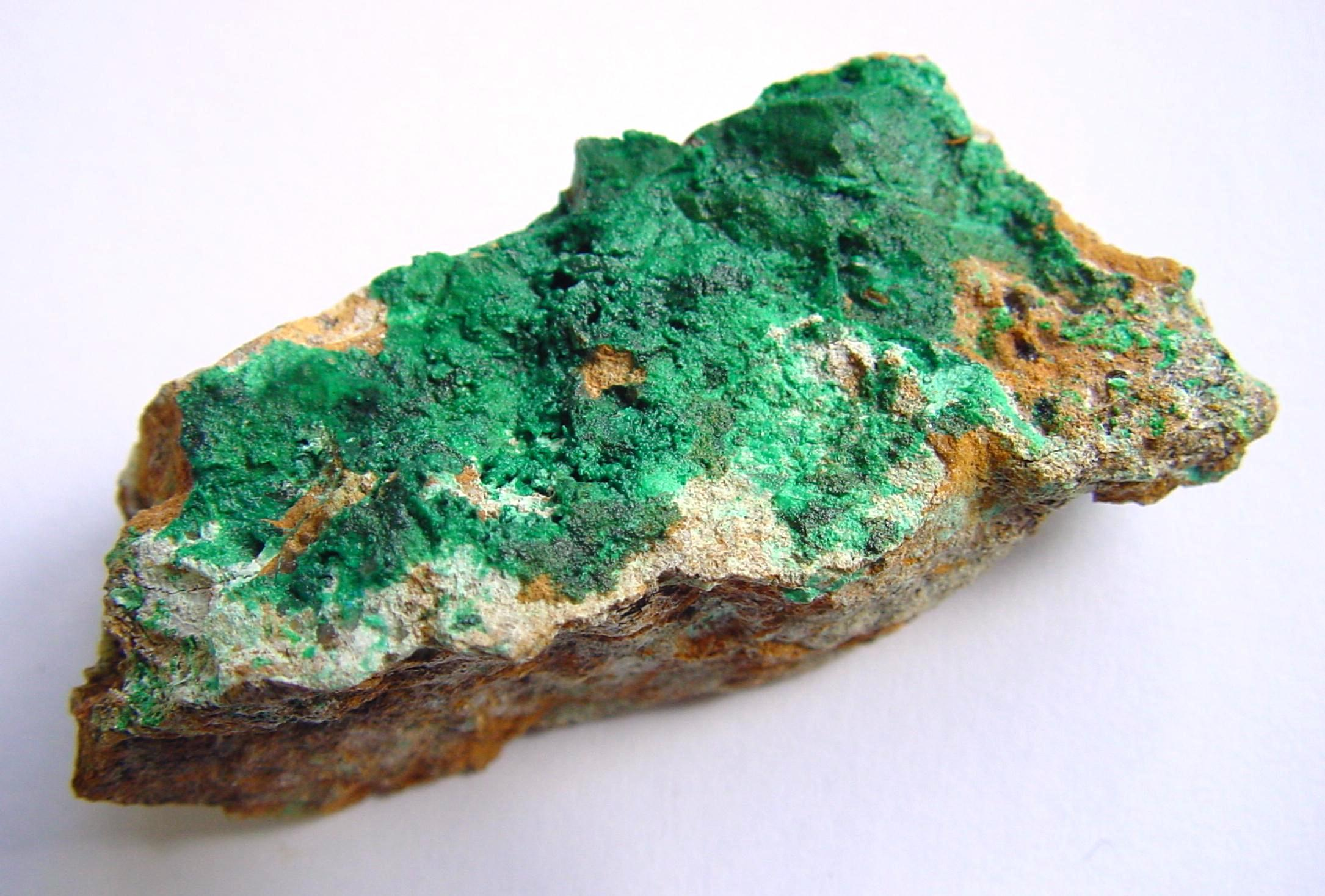
- Cornubite from Majuba Hill, Nevada, US. Specimen size 5 cm

General
- Category: Arsenate minerals
- Formula: Cu_{5}(AsO_{4})_{2}(OH)_{4}
- Strunz classification: 8.BD.30
- Dana classification: 41.04.02.01
- Crystal system: Triclinic
- Crystal class: Pinacoidal (1̅) (same H-M symbol)
- Space group: P1̅

Identification
- Color: Light or dark green
- Crystal habit: Fibrous, botryoidal, globular or massive, also rare tabular crystals
- Cleavage: Distinct in two directions
- Mohs scale hardness: 4
- Luster: Vitreous
- Streak: Light green
- Diaphaneity: Translucent to transparent
- Specific gravity: 4.64
- Optical properties: Biaxial (−)
- Refractive index: N_{α} = 1.87, N_{β} not determined, N_{γ} = 1.90
- Birefringence: r>v
- Other characteristics: Not radioactive

Cornubite is a rare secondary copper arsenate mineral with formula: Cu_{5}(AsO_{4})_{2}(OH)_{4}. It was first described for its discovery in 1958 in Wheal Carpenter, Gwinear, Cornwall, England, UK. The name is from Cornubia, the medieval Latin name for Cornwall. It is a dimorph of cornwallite, and the arsenic analogue of pseudomalachite.

== Physical properties ==
Cleavage is distinct in two directions, both perpendicular to the enlarged faces of the tabular crystals, intersecting at about 70°. Cornubite is fairly soft, with hardness 4, the same as fluorite, and specific gravity 4.64, which is similar to another copper arsenate, clinoclase, at 4.38, but much denser than quartz, at 2.66.

== Optical properties ==
All triclinic minerals are biaxial; cornubite is biaxial (−). Its refractive indices are quite high, close to 1.9, similar to zircon and garnet. It is green, as are many copper minerals, usually translucent, with a vitreous luster and a light green streak.

== Unit cell ==
Cornubite belongs to the triclinic crystal class 1̅, space group P1̅, meaning that it has a very low symmetry, with only a center of symmetry and no mirror planes or axes of symmetry. In 1984 Sieber, Hofmeister, Tillmans and Abraham reported new data from microprobe analysis of cornubite, which gave unit cell parameters a = 6.121 Å, b = 6.251 Å, c = 6.790 Å, α = 92.93°, β = 111.3°, γ = 107.47° and Z = 1.

== Structure ==
The structure is made up of sheets of edge-shared Cu(O,OH)_{6} octahedra, with a copper atom Cu in the middle of the octahedron and either oxygen O or hydroxyl OH at each of the six vertices. These sheets are connected together by AsO_{4} groups with an arsenic As atom in the middle and O at each of the four vertices. In the AsO_{4} groups three of the Os are shared with octahedra in one octahedral sheet, and the fourth O is shared with an octahedron in the adjacent sheet. Hydrogen bonds also connect the sheets together.

== Crystal habit ==
Crystals, which are very rare, are tabular, often in aggregates as rosettes. Cornubite is generally fibrous, botryoidal, globular or massive.

== Environment ==
Cornubite is a secondary mineral found in the oxidised zone of copper deposits. In Cornwall it is found in drusy quartz associated with malachite, Cu_{2}(CO_{3})(OH)_{2}, olivenite, Cu_{2}(AsO_{4})(OH), cuprite, Cu_{2}O, cornwallite, Cu^{2+}_{5}(AsO_{4})_{2}(OH)_{2}, and liroconite, Cu^{2+}_{2}Al(AsO_{4})(OH)_{4}·4H_{2}O. Some of the world's best specimens come from the Majuba Hill Mine in the Antelope District, Nevada, US. Cornubite occurs there as light green botryoidal crusts on rhyolite or as balls and crusts on cornwallite, also as coatings on clinoclase and pseudomorphs after parnauite. Other associations are with chalcophyllite, chenevixite, pseudomalachite, bayldonite, tyrolite, azurite and chrysocolla.

== Type locality ==
The type locality is Wheal Carpenter, Gwinear, Cornwall, UK. The type material is conserved at the Natural History Museum, London, reference BM.1958,122.
