= Strashimirite =

Rare monoclinic mineral

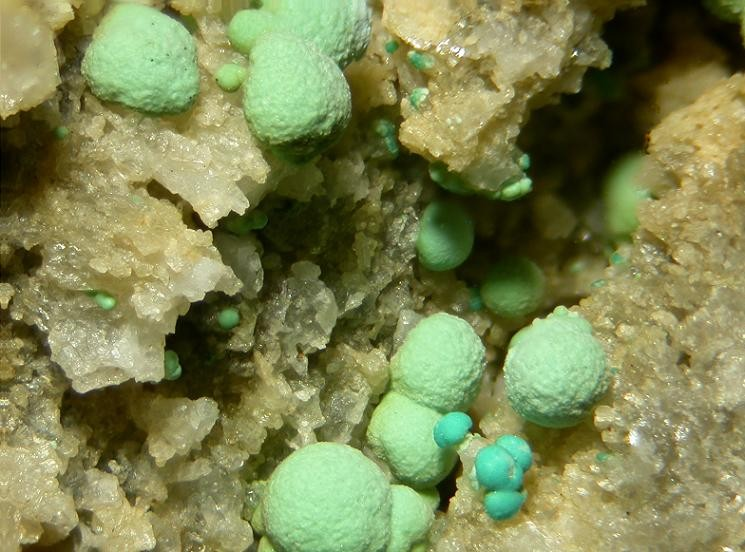
- Strashimirite from Schwarzleo District, Schwarzleograben, Hütten, Leogang, Saalfelden, Salzburg, Austria Field of view 4 mm. Depth of field is achieved with CombineZM. Specimen and photo Leon Hupperichs.

General
- Category: Arsenate mineral
- Formula: Cu_{8}(AsO_{4})_{4}(OH)_{4}·5(H_{2}O)
- IMA symbol: Ssh
- Strunz classification: 8.DC.12 (10 ed); 7/D.07-20 (8 ed)
- Dana classification: 42.6.5.1
- Crystal system: Monoclinic; Unknown space group
- Space group: P2/m, P2, or Pm
- Unit cell: a = 9.71 Å, b = 18.81 Å c = 8.94 Å; β = 97.2°; Z = 3

Identification
- Color: White, pale green
- Crystal habit: Elongated, tabular crystals; crusts; radiating aggregates
- Cleavage: Parting at right angle to elongation
- Mohs scale hardness: 2.5–3
- Luster: Greasy, pearly
- Diaphaneity: Semitransparent
- Specific gravity: 3.67 (calculated)
- Optical properties: Biaxial (−)
- Refractive index: n_{α} = 1.726 n_{γ} = 1.747
- Birefringence: δ = 0.021
- Pleochroism: Weak; Y = very pale yellowish green; Z = yellowish green
- 2V angle: 70°

Strashimirite (IMA symbol: Ssh) is a rare monoclinic mineral containing arsenic, copper, hydrogen, and oxygen. It has the chemical formula Cu_{8}(AsO_{4})_{4}(OH)_{4}·5(H_{2}O).

This mineral was discovered in Zapachitsa (Zapacica) copper deposit, Svoge, Sofia Oblast, Bulgaria in 1960, by Bulgarian mineralogist Jordanka Minčeva-Stefanova. She named it after Strashimir Dimitrov (1892–1960), Professor in Mineralogy and Petrography at Sofia University "St Kliment Ohridski", Bulgaria. The International Mineralogical Association approved it as a new mineral in 1968.

It occurs as a secondary mineral phase in the oxidation zone of copper arsenide deposits. It occurs associated with tyrolite, cornwallite, clinoclase, euchroite, olivenite, parnauite, goudeyite, arthurite, metazeunerite, chalcophyllite, cyanotrichite, scorodite, pharmacosiderite, brochantite, azurite, malachite and chrysocolla.

Although it remains quite rare, strashimirite has subsequently been identified in a number of locations including: Novoveska Huta in the Slovakia; on the west flank of Cherbadung (Pizzo Cervandone), Binntal, Valais, Switzerland; in Kamsdorf and Saalfeld, Thuringia, Germany; the Clara mine, near Oberwolfach, Black Forest, Germany; in the Richelsdorf Mountains, Hesse, Germany; Cap Garonne mine, near le Pradet, Var, and Triembach-au-Val, Haut-Rhin, France; Wheals Gorland and Unity, Gwennap, Cornwall, England; the Tynagh mine, near Loughrea, Co. Galway, Ireland; the Majuba Hill mine, Antelope district, Pershing Co. Nevada, US; and the Centennial Eureka mine, Tintic district, Juab Co., Utah, US.

Usage: Strashimirite's composition is made up of 24% of arsenic. The usage seems to be little to none for this mineral.

== See also ==
- List of minerals named after people

== Notes ==
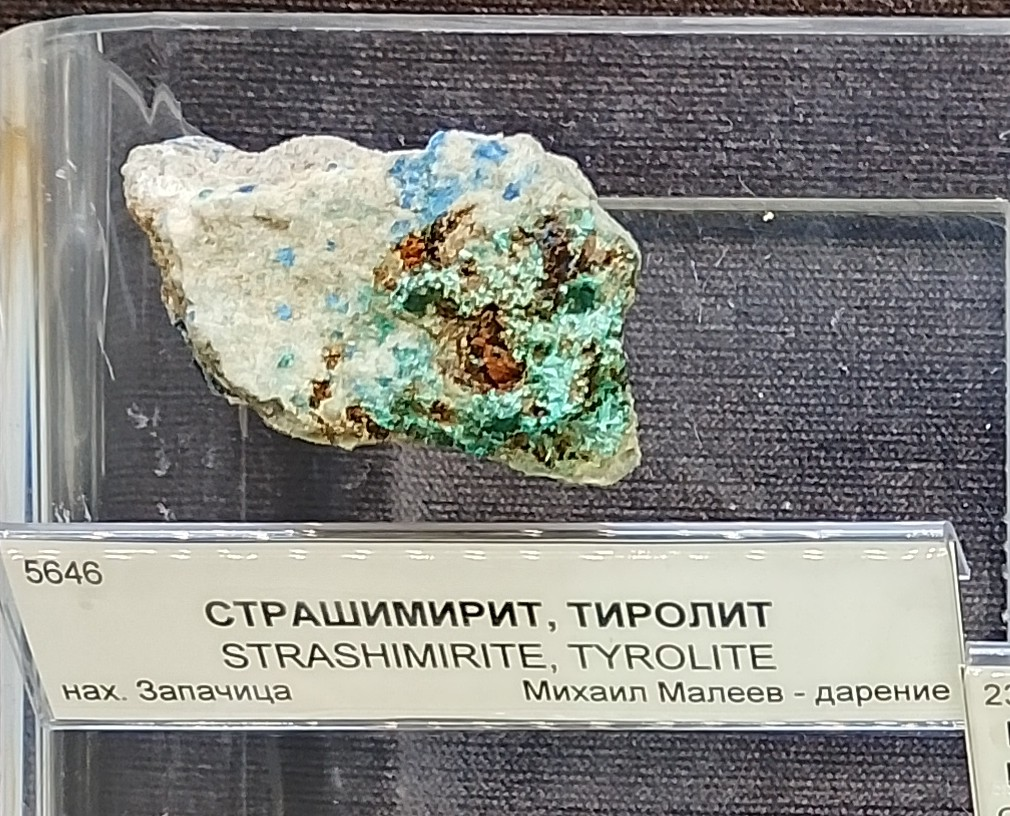
Exhibition of Strashimirite, Tyrolite from Zapatchitza deposit, coll. M. Maleev - Earth and Man National Museum, Bulgaria
