= Cornwallite =

Copper arsenate mineral

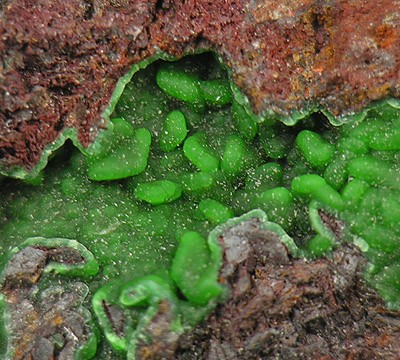
- Cornwallite in a vug from Pastrana, Murcia, Spain (size: 4.3 × 3.7 × 2.2 cm)

General
- Category: Arsenate mineral
- Formula: Cu_{5}(AsO_{4})_{2}(OH)_{4}
- IMA symbol: Cnw
- Strunz classification: 8.BD.05
- Dana classification: 41.4.2.2
- Crystal system: Monoclinic
- Crystal class: Prismatic (2/m) (same H-M symbol)
- Space group: P2_{1}/c
- Unit cell: a = 17.33 Å, b = 5.82 Å, c = 4.60 Å; β = 92.22°; Z = 2

Identification
- Color: Verdigis green, blackish-green, emerald-green
- Crystal habit: Microcrystalline radial fibrous, botryoidal to globular crusts
- Cleavage: Distinct in one direction
- Fracture: Conchoidal
- Tenacity: Brittle
- Mohs scale hardness: 4.5
- Luster: Sub-vitreous, resinous, waxy
- Streak: Apple green
- Diaphaneity: Translucent to opaque
- Specific gravity: 4.17
- Optical properties: Biaxial (+/−)
- Refractive index: n_{α} = 1.810 – 1.820 n_{β} = 1.815 – 1.860 n_{γ} = 1.850 – 1.880
- Birefringence: δ = 0.040 – 0.060
- 2V angle: Measured: 30° to 50°

Cornwallite is an uncommon copper arsenate mineral with formula Cu_{5}(AsO_{4})_{2}(OH)_{4}. It forms a series with the phosphate pseudomalachite and is a dimorph of the triclinic cornubite. It is a green monoclinic mineral which forms as radial to fibrous encrustations.

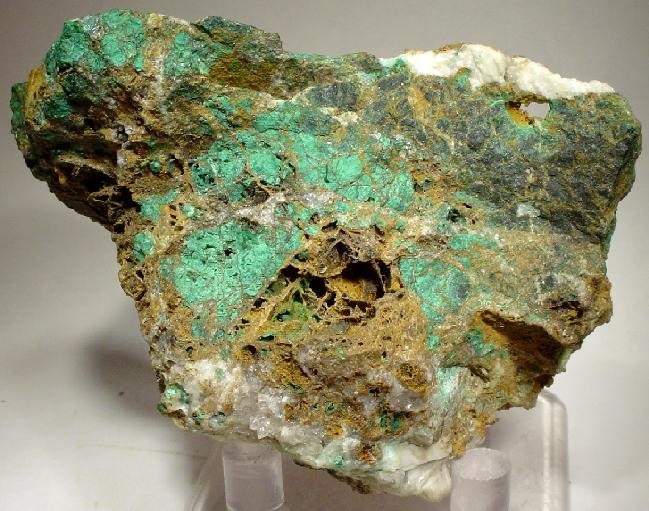
Botryoidal, green cornwallite in a gossan with white baryte from Caldbeck Fells, Cumbria (7.6 × 5.1 × 4.7 cm)

== Discovery and occurrence ==
It was first described in 1846, for an occurrence in Wheal Gorland, St Day United Mines of the St Day District, Cornwall, England. It occurs as secondary mineral in the oxidized zone of copper sulfide deposits. Associated minerals include olivenite, cornubite, arthurite, clinoclase, chalcophyllite, strashimirite, lavendulan, tyrolite, spangolite, austinite, conichalcite, brochantite, azurite and malachite.

== See also ==
- Kernowite, another mineral named after Cornwall
