= Liroconite =

Copper aluminium arsenate mineral

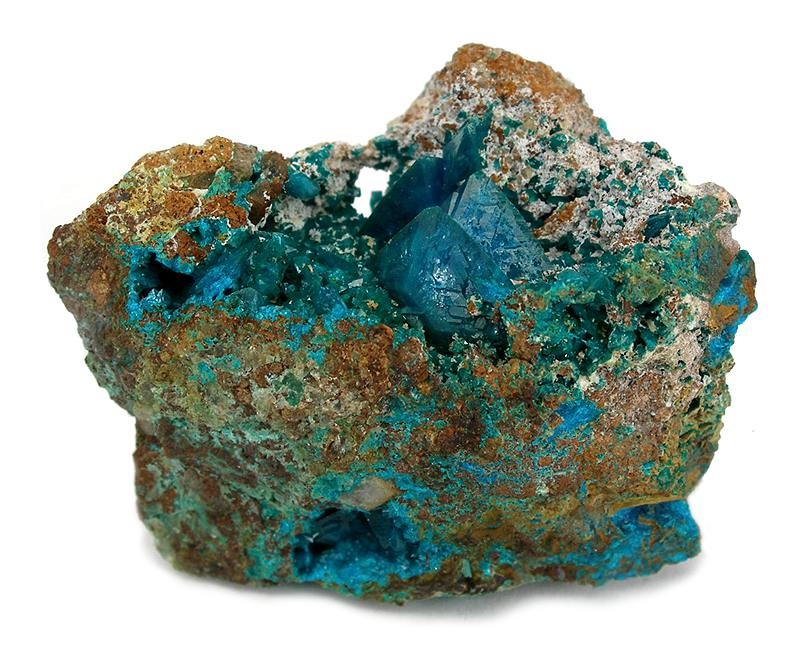

General
- Category: Arsenate minerals
- Formula: Cu_{2}Al[(OH)_{4}|AsO_{4}]·4(H_{2}O)
- IMA symbol: Lro
- Strunz classification: 8.DF.20
- Crystal system: Monoclinic
- Crystal class: Prismatic (2/m) (same H-M symbol)
- Space group: I2/a
- Unit cell: a = 12.66, b = 7.57 c = 9.89 [Å]; β = 91.25°; Z = 4

Identification
- Color: Bright blue to green
- Crystal habit: Typically as striated flattened octahedral or lenticular crystals, also massive to granular
- Cleavage: Indistinct on {110} and {011}
- Fracture: Irregular/uneven, conchoidal
- Mohs scale hardness: 2–2 1/2
- Luster: Vitreous to resinous
- Streak: Light blue
- Diaphaneity: Transparent, translucent
- Specific gravity: 2.9–3
- Optical properties: Biaxial (−)
- Refractive index: n_{α} = 1.612 n_{β} = 1.652 n_{γ} = 1.675
- Birefringence: δ = 0.063
- 2V angle: Measured: 67°

Liroconite is a complex mineral: Hydrated copper aluminium arsenate hydroxide, with the formula Cu_{2}Al[(OH)_{4}|AsO_{4}]·4(H_{2}O). It is a vitreous monoclinic mineral, colored bright blue to green, often associated with malachite, azurite, olivenite, and clinoclase. It is quite soft, with a Mohs hardness of 2–2.5, and has a specific gravity of 2.9–3.0.

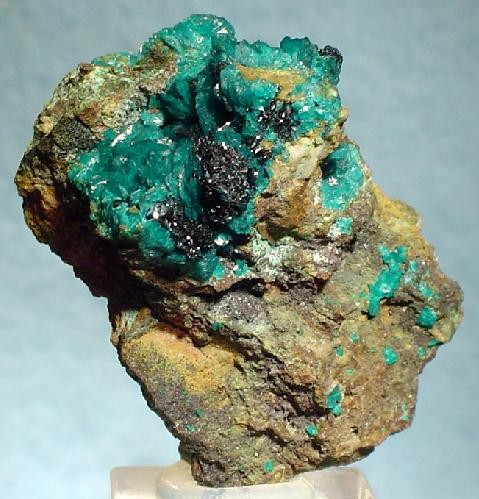
Vugs in gossan lined with lustrous, blue-green liroconite blades and sparkly, dark blue clinoclase microcrystals from Wheal Gorland (size: 3.4 × 3.0 × 2.0 cm)

It was first identified in 1825 in the tin and copper mines of Devon and Cornwall, England. Although it remains quite rare it has subsequently been identified in a variety of locations including France, Germany, Australia, New Jersey and California.

The type locality for liroconite is Wheal Gorland in St Day, Cornwall in the United Kingdom. The largest crystal specimen on public display is in the Royal Cornwall Museum in Truro.

It occurs as a secondary mineral in copper deposits in association with olivenite, chalcophyllite, clinoclase, cornwallite, strashimirite, malachite, cuprite and limonite.

== Structure ==
Liroconite crystallizes in the monoclinic crystal system. The crystal structure consists of a framework of AsO_{4} tetrahedra, Jahn-Teller-distorted [CuO_{2}(OH)_{2}(H_{2}O)_{2}] octahedra and [AlO_{2}(OH)_{4}] octahedra.

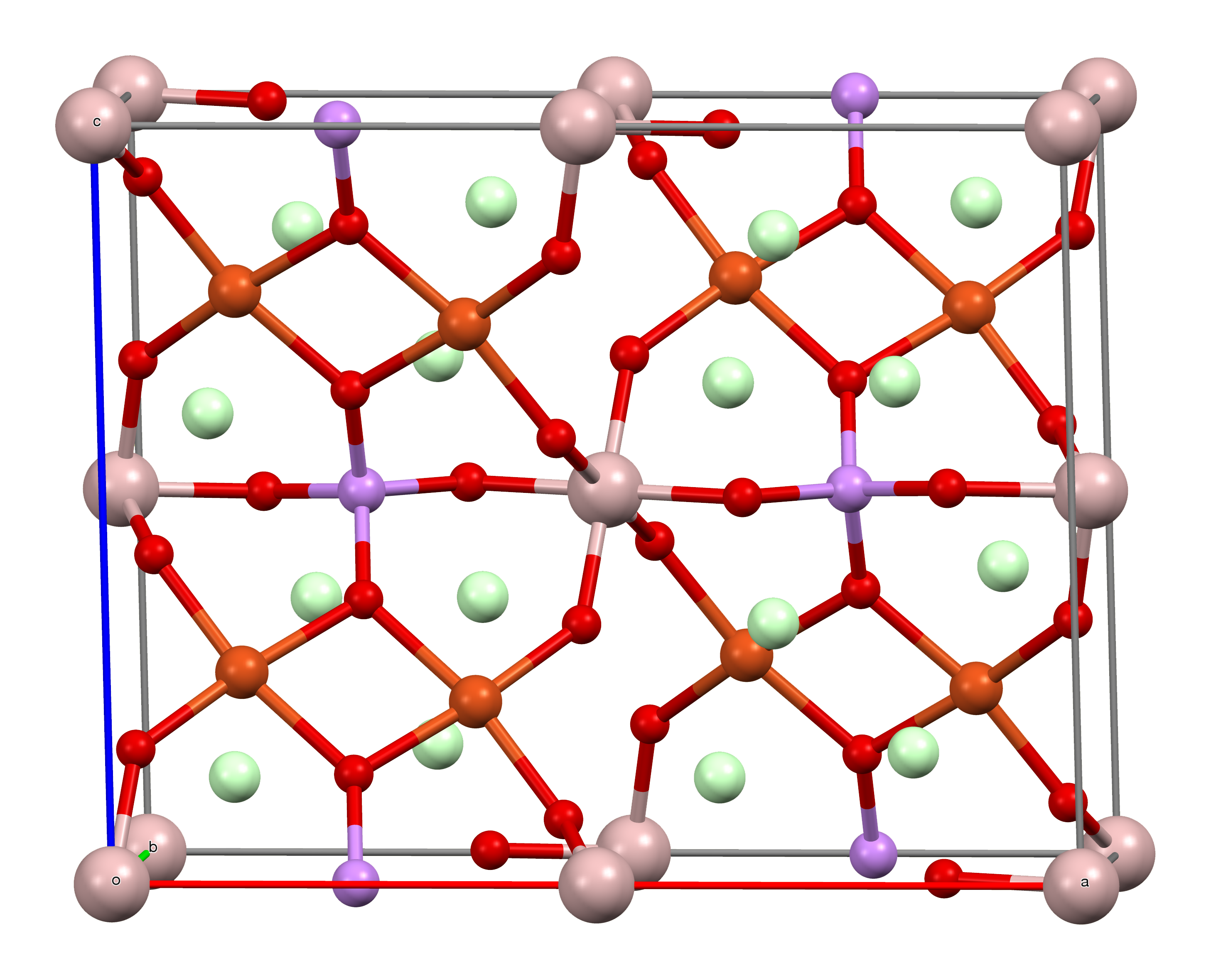

== See also ==
- Kernowite – an isostructural mineral with iron in place of aluminium
