= Copper phosphate =

Copper phosphate may refer to:

- Copper(II) phosphate, cupric salt of phosphoric acid
- Copper(I) phosphate, cuprous salt of phosphoric acid
- A number of copper phosphate minerals, including :
  - Turquoise, a hydrated basic copper aluminium phosphate, CuAl_{6}(PO_{4})_{4}(OH)_{8}·4H_{2}O
  - Pseudomalachite, a basic copper phosphate similar in appearance to malachite
  - Ludjibaite
  - Reichenbachite
  - Cornetite, a basic copper phosphate
  - Libethenite, a rare basic copper phosphate
  - Sampleite, a copper phosphate mineral with sodium, calcium, and chlorine counter ions
  - Tsumebite, a rare lead/copper phosphate/sulfate
  - Veszelyite, (de:Veszelyit), a copper/zinc phosphate

== See also ==
- Metatorbernite, Torbernite - copper uranyl phosphates
- Andrewsite, a discredited copper/iron phosphate, now known to be a mixture
- Arthurite, a mixed copper/iron mineral with phosphate/sulphate/arsenate : CuFe_{2}^{3+}(AsO_{4},PO_{4},SO_{4})_{2}(O,OH)_{2}•4H_{2}O.
- Copper phosphide
