= Lavendulan =

Uncommon arsenate mineral

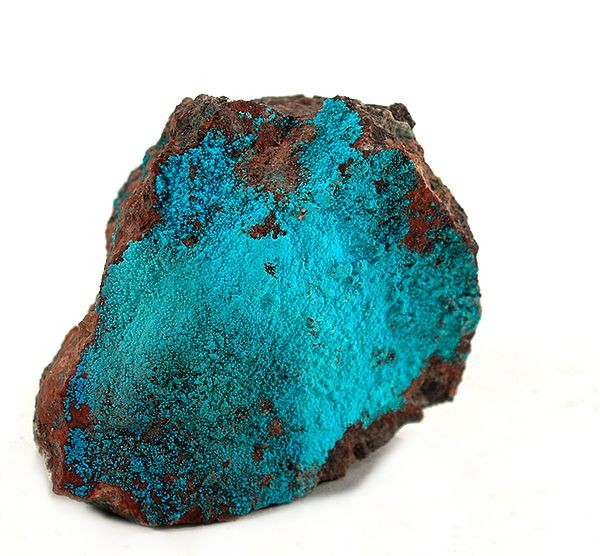

General
- Category: Arsenate mineral
- Formula: NaCaCu_{5}(AsO_{4})_{4}Cl·5H_{2}O
- IMA symbol: Lvd
- Strunz classification: 8.DG.05
- Dana classification: 42.9.4.2
- Crystal system: Monoclinic
- Crystal class: Prismatic (2/m) (same H-M symbol)
- Space group: P2_{1}/n

Identification
- Formula mass: 1,062.00 g/mol
- Color: Blue or greenish blue
- Crystal habit: Thin botryoidal crusts of minute radiating fibers or thin rectangular, pseudo-orthorhombic plates
- Twinning: Common
- Cleavage: Good on {010}, distinct on {100} and {001}
- Fracture: Uneven
- Tenacity: Brittle
- Mohs scale hardness: 2 1/2 2 1/2 to 3
- Luster: Vitreous to waxy, satiny in aggregates
- Streak: Light blue
- Diaphaneity: Translucent
- Specific gravity: 3.54 3.84
- Optical properties: Biaxial (−), nearly uniaxial (−)
- Refractive index: Nx = 1.645 Ny = 1.715 Nz = 1.725 Nx = 1.660 Ny = 1.715 Nz = 1.734; Nx = 1.66 Ny = 1.715 Nz = 1.734 omega = 1.748 epsilon = 1.645
- Pleochroism: O = pale blue to pale greenish blue, E = blue to greenish blue
- Solubility: Easily soluble in hydrochloric acid
- Other characteristics: Not radioactive

Lavendulan is an uncommon arsenate mineral in the lavendulan group. It is known for its characteristic intense electric blue colour. Lavendulan is very similar to lemanskiite, the analogue trihydrate mineral, to the point of them being considered dimorphs. Lemanskiite is tetragonal, but lavendulan is monoclinic. Lavendulan has the same structure as sampleite, and the two minerals form a series. It is the calcium analogue of zdenĕkite and the arsenate analogue of sampleite.

Lavendulan was originally named for the lavender color of the "type" specimen, which has since been determined to be a mixture with no relationship to modern lavendulan. The mineral which is now called lavendulan is not a lavender blue color, and has no relationship to the "type" material from Annaberg. It often contains potassium, cobalt and nickel as impurities.

== Unit cell ==
Although lavendulan is monoclinic, the angle β is very close to 90°, making the mineral pseudo-orthorhombic. Most references describe the lavendulan unit cell as an orthorhombic cell containing 8 formula units (Z = 8) but Mindat.org describes a monoclinic unit cell with the length of the c axis halved, and only 4 formula units per unit cell (Z = 4) and space group P2_{1}/n. Unit cell parameters are reported as

- a = 9.73 Å, b = 41.0 Å, c = 9.85 Å, Z = 8
- a = 9.815 Å, b = 40.394 Å, c = 9.99 Å, Z = 8
- a = 9.73 Å, b = 41.0 Å, c = 9.85 Å, Z = 8
- a = 10.011 Å, b = 19.478 Å, c = 10.056 Å, β = 90.37°, Z = 4

== Physical properties ==
Lavendulan is a blue or greenish blue translucent mineral, with a vitreous to waxy luster, satiny in aggregates, and a light blue streak. It occurs as thin botryoidal crusts of minute radiating fibers or as thin rectangular, pseudo-orthorhombic plates, with cleavage in three directions, nearly perfect perpendicular to the b crystal axis, and distinct perpendicular to the a and c axes. Twinning is common. The mineral is brittle, with an uneven fracture. It is quite soft, with hardness 2.5, between gypsum and calcite, and relatively dense; its specific gravity is 3.84, close to that of topaz, and much denser than quartz (specific gravity 2.5 to 2.7). It is easily soluble in hydrochloric acid.

== Optical properties ==
The refractive index varies with the direction of propagation of the light, and varies between 1.64 and 1.75. This is quite high, between topaz and ruby. Lavendulan is biaxial (−), and most sources quote values for three refractive indices, for light travelling parallel to the three crystal axes. One source, however, gives lavendulan as nearly uniaxial (−), and quotes only two refractive indices, for the ordinary and extraordinary rays.

- N_{x} = 1.645 N_{y} = 1.715 N_{z} = 1.725
- N_{x} = 1.660 N_{y} = 1.715 N_{z} = 1.734
- N_{x} = 1.66 N_{y} = 1.715 N_{z} = 1.734
- N_{ω} = 1.748 N_{ε} = 1.645.

Lavendulan is pleochroic, with O = pale blue to pale greenish blue and E = blue to greenish blue.

== Environment ==
Lavendulan is a rare secondary mineral in the oxidised zone of some copper-arsenic deposits.

== Type locality ==
A lavender blue mineral was discovered in 1837 by Johann F. A. Breithaupt in Annaberg in the Ore Mountains, which is a mountainous region spanning the Czech Republic and Germany. The mineral was named "lavendulan" after the color, and Annaberg was the designated type locality. In 1853, Vogel found a specimen of lavendulan from Jáchymov, also in the Ore Mountains, which was similar in appearance and characteristics to the material from Annaberg. In 1877 Goldsmith examined some specimens of a turquoise blue arsenate of copper from the cobalt deposits of San Juan, Chile, and announced that they were also lavendulan.

Nearly fifty years later, In 1924, William Foshag announced that the Chilean material was entirely distinct from that from Jáchymov, and he determined that it was a new mineral, and gave it the name freirinite, from the locality, the Blanca Mine, Freirina, Huasca Province, Atacama Region, Chile.

In 1957, however, Claude Guillemin found that lavendulan and freirinite from the type localities gave identical x-ray powder patterns, and freirinite was discredited as a mineral species. Yet another fifty years passed, and in 2007 Geister et al. re-examined Breithaupt's type specimen and found that it was a mixture unrelated to modern lavendulan. The second locality where lavendulan was found is in the Czech Republic, so the type locality of the species was changed to there, namely Jáchymov, Ore Mountains, Karlovy Vary Region. The type material is held at the Mining Academy, Freiberg, Germany, reference 20944.

== Occurrences ==
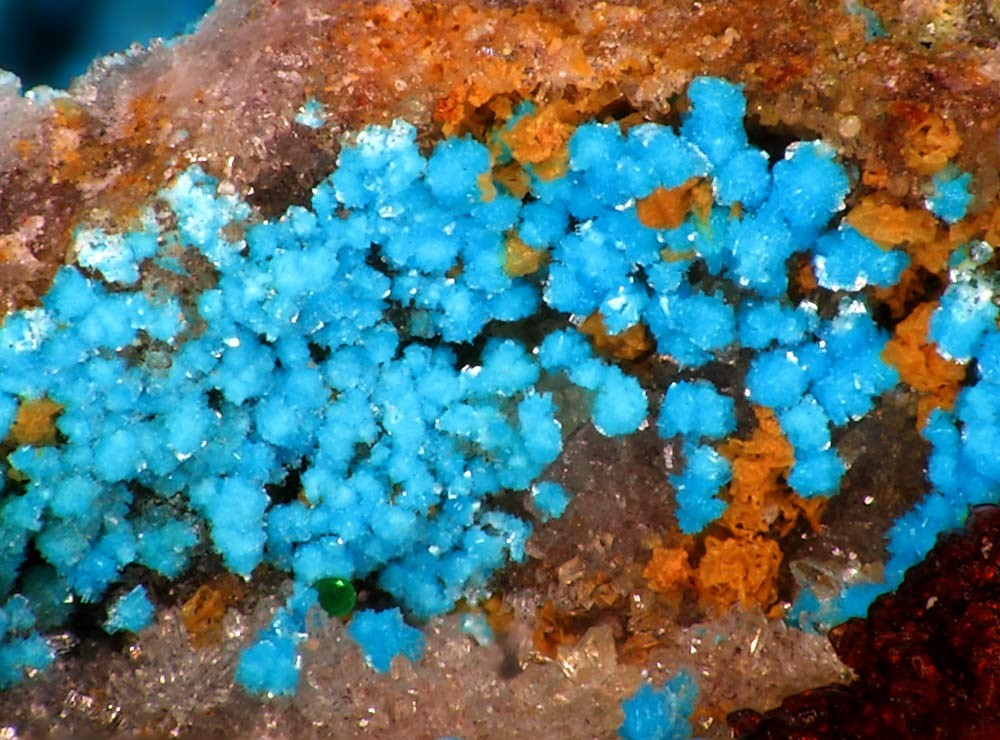
Lavendulan from Maria Josefa Mine, Rodalquilar, Almeria, Spain

At the type locality, lavendulan occurs associated with erythrite and a cobalt molybdate originally called pateraite, but now discredited. At San Juan, Chile, it is associated with erythrite, cuprite, malachite and cobaltian wad. At the Cap Garonne Mine, Pradet, Var, Provence-Alpes-Côte d'Azur, France, associated minerals are chalcophyllite, cyanotrichite, parnauite, mansfieldite, olivenite, tennantite, covellite, chalcanthite, antlerite, brochantite and geminite. It also occurs at Tsumeb, Namibia, associated with cuprian adamite, conichalcite, o'danielite, tsumcorite, fahleite, quartz, calcite and gypsum.
