= Chalcophyllite =

Rare secondary copper arsenate mineral

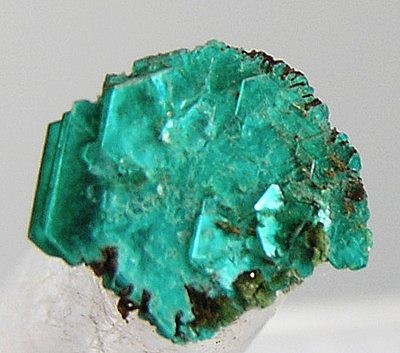
- Chalcophyllite from the Ting Tang Mine, Carharrack, Cornwall, England. Photo by Rob Lavinsky

General
- Category: Arsenate minerals
- Formula: Cu_{18}Al_{2}(AsO_{4})_{4}(SO_{4})_{3}(OH)_{24}·36(H_{2}O) or Cu_{18}Al_{2}(AsO_{4})_{3}(SO_{4})_{3}(OH)_{27}·33(H_{2}O)
- IMA symbol: Chp
- Strunz classification: 8.DF.30
- Dana classification: 43.5.14.1
- Crystal system: Trigonal
- Crystal class: Rhomboedral (3̅); H-M symbol: (3̅)
- Space group: R3̅

Identification
- Color: Blue-green to emerald-green
- Crystal habit: Crystals platy and six-sided, also as rosettes, drusy, foliated or massive.
- Twinning: On {1010} as twin plane.
- Cleavage: Perfect on {0001}
- Fracture: Irregular
- Mohs scale hardness: 2
- Luster: Vitreous to subadamantine, pearly on {0001}
- Streak: Pale green
- Diaphaneity: Transparent to translucent
- Specific gravity: 2.67 to 2.69 or 2.4 to 2.66
- Optical properties: Uniaxial (−)
- Refractive index: n_{ω} = 1.618 to 1.632, n_{ε} = 1.552 to 1.575
- Pleochroism: O blue-green, E almost colorless
- Solubility: Soluble in acids and in ammonia
- Other characteristics: Can be partially dehydrated. Alters to chrysocolla. Nonfluorescent, not radioactive

Chalcophyllite is a rare secondary copper arsenate mineral occurring in the oxidized zones of some arsenic-bearing copper deposits. It was first described from material collected in Germany. At one time chalcophyllite from Wheal Tamar in Cornwall, England, was called tamarite, but this name is now discredited (not to be confused with the amphibole mineral taramite, which is quite different). At Wheal Gorland a specimen exhibiting partial replacement of liriconite, Cu_{2}Al(AsO_{4})(OH)_{4}·(4H_{2}O), by chalcophyllite has been found. The mineral is named from the Greek, chalco "copper" and fyllon, "leaf", in allusion to its composition and platy structure. It is a classic Cornish mineral that can be confused with tabular spangolite.

== Formula ==
Two different formulae are quoted in the literature for chalcophyllite, Cu_{18}Al_{2}(AsO_{4})_{4}(SO_{4})_{3}(OH)_{24}·36(H_{2}O) (molar mass 3098 g) and Cu_{18}Al_{2}(AsO_{4})_{3}(SO_{4})_{3}(OH)_{27}·33(H_{2}O) (molar mass 2956 g). The difference reflects the fact that the water content varies at room temperature based on relative humidity.

== Unit cell ==
Chalcophyllite crystallizes in the trigonal crystal class, 3 2/m with space group R 3m or 3̅ with space group R 3̅. Some authors choose a unit cell with three formula units per cell (Z = 3), and some a smaller unit cell with only 1.5 formula units per cell (Z = 1.5). For the larger unit cell a = 10.77 Å, c = 57.5 Å, Z = 3. For the smaller unit cell c is only half as long, a = 10.756 Å, c = 28.678 Å, Z = 1.5.

== Crystal habit ==
Crystals are platy, six-sided and flattened perpendicular to the c crystal axis, and may be striated triangularly on these flattened faces. It may form rosettes, or be drusy, foliated or massive.

== Physical properties ==
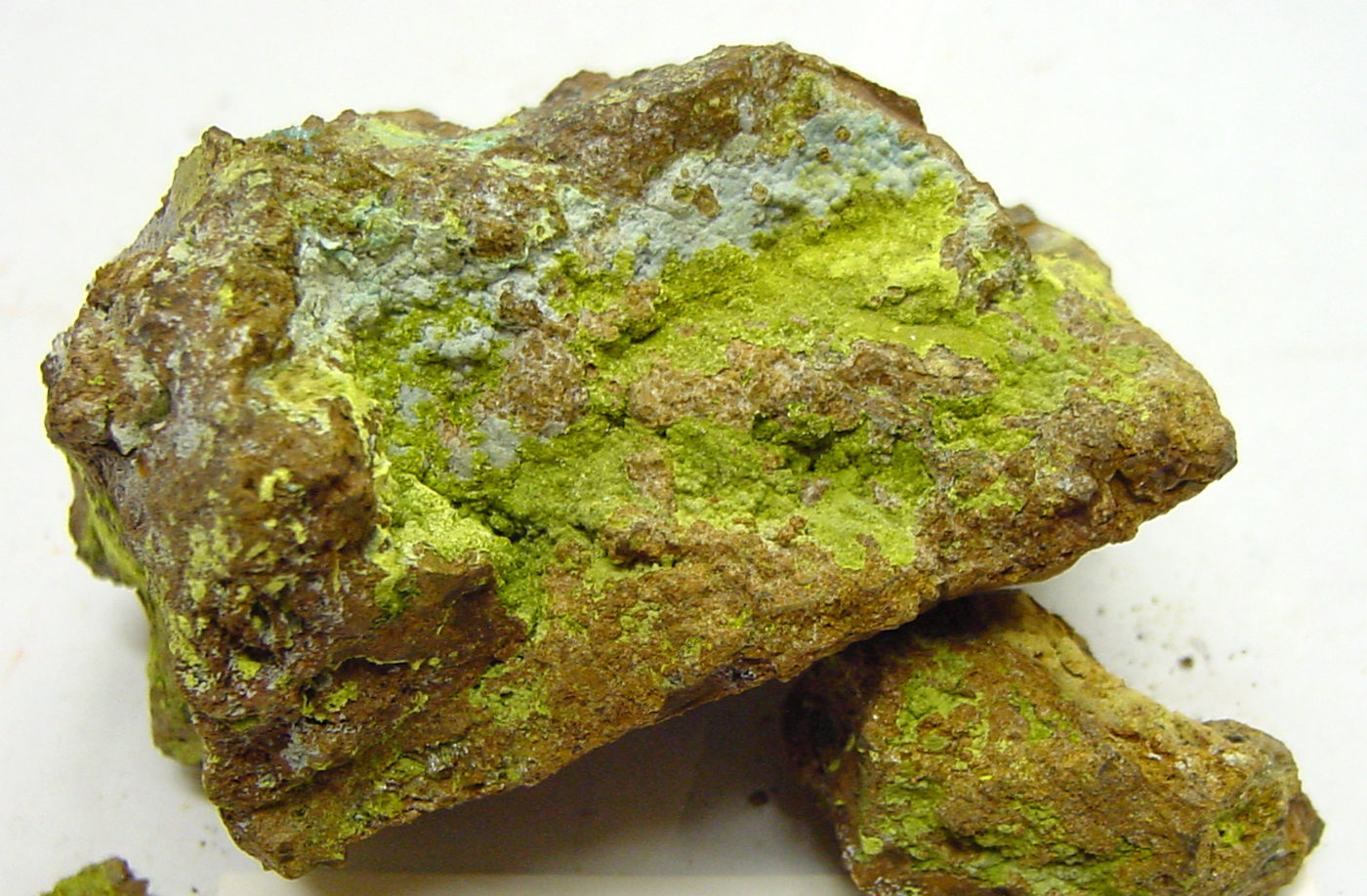
Chalcophyllite from Lemhi County, Idaho

Cleavage is perfect perpendicular to the c crystal axis, and twinning occurs with {1010} as the twin plane. Fracture is irregular. The mineral is soft, with hardness only 2, the same as gypsum. Specific gravity is generally given in the range 2.67 to 2.69, but Webmineral has 2.4 to 2.66. Chalcophyllite is soluble in acids and in ammonia. It is not fluorescent, nor radioactive. The water content varies at room temperature based on relative humidity. Chalcophyllite alters to chrysocolla, which is a copper-aluminium silicate with the formula (Cu,Al)_{2}H_{2}Si_{2}O_{5}(OH)_{4}·n(H_{2}O).

== Optical properties ==
Many copper minerals are blue or green in color; chalcophyllite is blue-green to emerald-green, with a pale green streak and vitreous to subadamantine luster, pearly on {0001}. Crystals are transparent to translucent. It is uniaxial (−) with refractive indices n_{ω} = 1.618 to 1.632 and n_{ε} = 1.552 to 1.575. Indices of refraction vary markedly depending on the relative humidity since the water content varies at ambient temperature. It is pleochroic with O blue-green and E almost colorless.

== Environment ==
Chalcophyllite is an uncommon secondary mineral occurring in the oxidized zones of some arsenic-bearing hydrothermal copper deposits. Associated minerals include azurite, malachite, brochantite, chrysocolla, spangolite, connellite, cuprite, cyanotrichite, strashimirite, parnauite, lavendulan, cornubite, langite, clinoclase, pharmacosiderite and mansfieldite. The type material is conserved at the Mining Academy, Freiberg, Germany. Notable occurrences include the Majuba Hill Mine, Antelope District, Nevada, US and Cornwall, including Wheal Gorland, UK.

== See also ==
- List of minerals
