= Clara Pit =

Mine in the Black Forest, Germany

Coordinates: 48.37975°N 8.22865°E

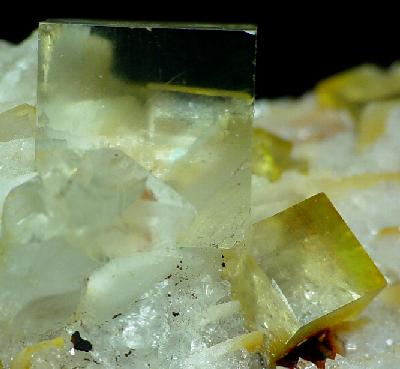
- 1.2 cm, colourless and transparent fluorite alongside baryte from the Clara Pit

Location
- Location: Oberwolfach

History
- Opened: 1898
- Active: Grube Clara
- Closed: open

Owner
- Company: Sachtleben Bergbau GmbH und Co. KG

The Clara Pit (German: Grube Clara) or Clara Mine is a working mine in Oberwolfach in the Black Forest in Germany in which the industrial minerals, baryte and fluorspar are mined.

== Importance ==
The pit is well known because, to date, over 375 different minerals have been found here (as at November 2004), including several that are very rare. The portal of the mine is located in the upper part of the Rankach valley. The processing plant is near Wolfach-Kirnbach in the Kinzig valley. Since 1898, the Clara Pit has mined over 3 million tonnes of baryte and over 2 million tonnes of fluorspar. Baryte is used inter alia in sound attenuation, radiation protection and the deep mining industry. Fluorspar or fluorite is used in the metal industry as a plasticiser (e.g. in welding electrodes) in the glass and ceramics industry and in the chemical industry for the production of hydrofluoric acid.

The pit, which is operated by the firm of Sachtleben Bergbau is the last active mine of the many that were once worked in the Black Forest.

Its most common minerals are azurite, baryte, chrysocolla, claraite, cornwallite, fluorite, goethite, clinoclase, copper, malachite, pyrite, pyromorphite, mimetite, stolzite, silver und scorodite.

== Mineral tailings ==
On the mineral tailings site of the Clara Pit in Wolfach-Kirnbach the various minerals may be looked for in separate raw mineral ore spoil heaps.

== Museum ==
In the Oberwolfach Mining and Mineral Museum in the village of Kirche over 200 minerals from the pit are displayed.

== Geology ==
The fissures in the mine are part of the Friedrich Christian Herrensegen Fault Zone in the Black Forest Gneiss Complex.

== Type localities ==
The Clara Pit has given its name to the mineral, claraite and is also the type locality for the following minerals: agardite-(Ce), arsenbrackebuschite, arsenocrandallite, arsenogorceixite, arsenogoyazite, bariopharmacosiderite, benauite, bismutostibiconite, claraite, cualstibite, phosphofibrite, phyllotungstite, rankachite, rhabdophane-(Ce), tungstibite, uranotungstite.
