= Lemanskiite =

Mineral

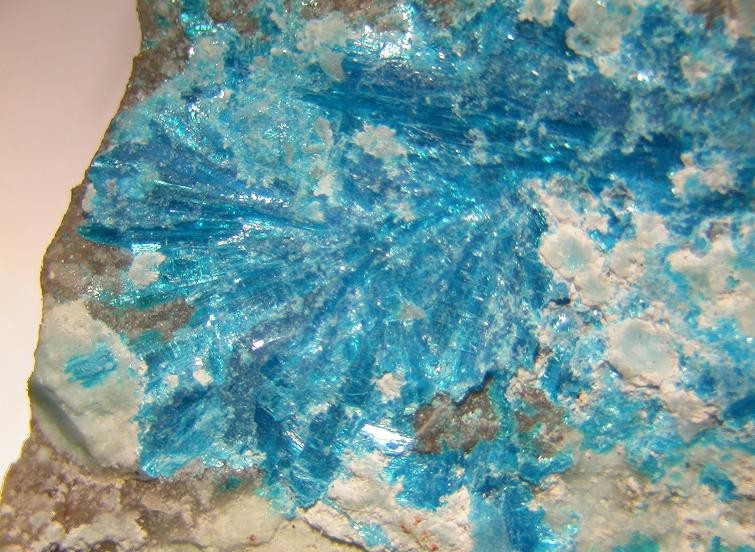

General
- Category: Arsenate minerals
- Formula: NaCaCu_{5}(AsO_{4})_{4}Cl·3H_{2}O
- IMA symbol: Lmk
- Strunz classification: 4/K.01-10
- Crystal system: Monoclinic
- Space group: P2_{1}/m
- Unit cell: a = 9.9758 Å, b=, c = 36.714 Å; β=; Z = 8

Identification
- Formula mass: 1060.88
- Color: Dark sky blue
- Crystal habit: Aggregates, rosette
- Cleavage: Perfect (001)
- Fracture: Irregular
- Tenacity: Brittle
- Mohs scale hardness: ~2.5
- Luster: Vitreous
- Streak: light blue
- Diaphaneity: Transparent
- Density: 3.78 g/cm^{3}
- Dispersion: v >> r strong
- Absorption spectra: Strong 900 cm^{−1}

Lemanskiite is a mineral that was first discovered in a mine at Abundancia mine, El Guanaco mining district, Chile, with the ideal formula of NaCaCu_{5}(AsO_{4})_{4}Cl·3H_{2}O. Originally, this mineral was discovered as being dimorphus with lavendulan, but in 2018 it was revised to only have 3 water molecules. Lemanskiite typically occurs as rosette-shaped aggregates of thin lamellar or needle-shaped aggregates, such as lammerite. Lemanskiite is dark sky blue with a light blue streak, it is brittle with an excellent cleavage plane. It was found on a dumping site in the abandoned Abundancia mine, El Guanaco mining district, Region II, Antofagasta Province, Chile The new mineral has been named after Chester S. Lemanski, Jr. This mineral and name were then approved by the Commission on New Minerals and Mineral Names of the International Mineralogical Association.

== Location, occurrence, and paragenesis ==
The Abundancia gold mine, El Guanaco mining district, is located south of Cerro La Estrella. The quartz veins contain several sulfides, mostly enargite, and it is associated with coarse grains and crystals of dark green lammerite. Other associated minerals include green crystals of olivenite, gray crystals of mansfieldite, white grains of senarmontite, and with a mixture from the crandallite group. Its intergrowths indicate very acid conditions of origin, characteristics of epithermal deposits.

== Physical properties ==
Lemanskiite normally forms with a habit of very large nodules up to five centimeters long; it can also form with veins of quartz. Lemanskiite has two different types of occurrences, needle-shaped and rosette-shaped aggregates. The needle-shaped aggregates are very thin plate-like individual crystals with a length of 0.8 mm and have a thickness of 10 μm. The rosette-shaped aggregates are thin, lamellar, subparallel intergrowths with very thin individual domains. Lemanskiite comes in a dark sky blue color. The mineral has also been found to be translucent. Lemanskiite has a hardness of around 2.5 on the Mohs scale, and has a density of 3.78 g/cm^{3}. It has excellent cleavage parallel to the largest face visible which is (001), has a brittle tenacity, has a light blue streak, and has a vitreous luster.

== Optical properties ==
Lemanskiite is uniaxial negative. The refractive indices ω = 1.749(2) and ε = 1.647(2), and It has high surface relief. It has strong pleochroism with a O value of dark green-blue and an E value of light blue-green (light turquoise).

== Chemical properties ==
Lemanskiite is a hydrous copper, calcium, and sodium chlorarsenate. The idealized formula is NaCaCu_{5}(AsO_{4})_{4}Cl·3H_{2}O. The empirical formula of this mineral, calculated on the basis of 20 O + Cl is Na_{0.98}(Ca_{0.98}Sr_{0.03})_{Σ1.01}Cu_{5.07}As_{3.97}O_{15.97}Cl_{1.03}•3H_{2}O. Lemanskiite is no longer a dimorph of lanendulan due to the lower H_{2}O content, as it was discovered in 2018, to actually less hydrated.

== Crystal structure ==
Lemanskiite is a member of the lavendulan group, and has a crystal structure that is based on heteropolyhedral layers parallel to (100). The heteropolyherdal layer are represented as Cu^{2+}-centered polyhedra and AsO_{4} tetrahedra. This new structural type being formed, shows clusters of four-edge shared copper fivefold polyhedra forming distorted tetragonal pyramids, with a chlorine being the shared apex. However, even though lemanskiite is a member of the lavendulan group, it differs in that the fourth vertex in each of the AsO_{4} is linked a copper-centered without a copper fivefold polyhedra cluster. Due to this, this copper site is instead a centered tetragonal pyramid with the oxygen atom of water molecule at a distant fifth apex CuO_{4}(H_{2}O).

== Chemical composition ==
Oxide	wt%
Na_{2}O	2.92
K_{2}O	0.02
CaO	5.32
SrO	0.26
CuO	38.99
As_{2}O_{5}	44.03
Cl	3.54
H_{2}O	5.22
Total	99.50

== X-ray crystallography ==
A single of lemanskiite, with excellent cleavage along the (001) plane, was examined with a XCalibur CCD diffractometer. Lemanskiite is in the monoclinic crystal system in the space group P2_{1}/m. The study of lemanskiite, performed at room temperature, produced the following data for a single unit cell of the crystal: a = 9.250(2) Å, b = 10.0058(10) Å, c = 10.0412(17) Å; β = 97.37°, V = 921.7(3) Å^{3}. The powder X-ray diffraction data of lemanskiite was analyzed on a Rigaku R-AXIS RAPID II diffractometer utilizing CoK_{a} radiation (λ = 1.79021 Å) in the Debye-Sherrer geometry (d = 127.4 mm). The collected data was integrated to account for several weak reflections in the data set. The final collected data of the two minerals in the powdered sample was 97.9% lemanskiite and 2.1% quartz.

== See also ==
List of Minerals
