= Cyanotrichite =

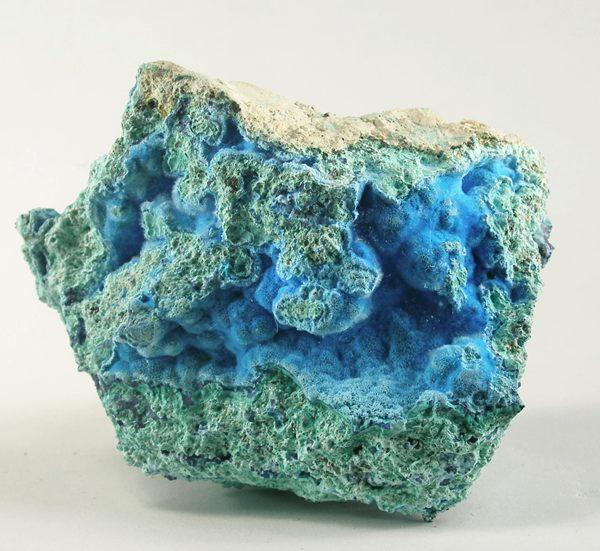
- Radiating sprays of cyanotrichite needles on matrix from the old Grand Canyon Mine now within Grand Canyon National Park (size: 3.8 × 3.7 × 1.2 cm)

General
- Category: Sulfate minerals
- Formula: Cu_{4}Al_{2}[(OH)_{12}|SO_{4}]·2H_{2}O
- IMA symbol: Cya
- Strunz classification: 7.DE.10
- Crystal system: Monoclinic
- Crystal class: Prismatic (2/m) (same H-M symbol)
- Space group: C2/m
- Unit cell: a = 10.16 Å, b = 12.61 Å, c = 2.9 Å; Z = 1

Identification
- Color: Sky-blue, azure-blue
- Crystal habit: Acicular crystals and fibrous aggregates; incrustations
- Fracture: Uneven
- Mohs scale hardness: 1–3
- Luster: Silky
- Streak: Light blue
- Diaphaneity: Transparent to translucent
- Specific gravity: 2.76
- Optical properties: Biaxial (+)
- Refractive index: n_{α} = 1.588 n_{β} = 1.617 n_{γ} = 1.655
- Birefringence: δ = 0.067
- Pleochroism: X = colorless; Y = pale blue; Z = bright blue
- 2V angle: Measured: 82°

Major varieties
- Polianite: pseudomorphic after manganite

Cyanotrichite is a hydrous copper aluminium sulfate mineral with formula Cu_{4}Al_{2}[(OH)_{12}|SO_{4}]·2H_{2}O, also known as lettsomite. Cyanotrichite forms velvety radial acicular crystal aggregates of extremely fine fibers. It crystallizes in the monoclinic system and forms translucent bright blue acicular crystal clusters or drusey coatings. The Mohs hardness is 2 and the specific gravity ranges from 2.74 to 2.95. Refractive indices are nα = 1.588 nβ = 1.617 nγ = 1.655.

== Occurrence and discovery ==
It is an oxidation product of primary copper mineralization in a weathering environment with abundant aluminium and sulfate. Associated minerals include brochantite, spangolite, chalcophyllite, olivenite, tyrolite, parnauite, azurite and malachite.

The main deposits are Cap la Garrone in the Var (France), Romania and Arizona (US).

It was first described in 1839 from Moldova Nouă, Banat, Romania. The name is from Greek kyaneos for "blue" and triches for "hair" referring to the typical color and habit. Its earlier name, Lettsomite, is taken from the name of William Garrow Lettsom (1805–1887), co-author of the 1858 Manual of the Mineralogy of Great Britain and Ireland.
