= Lavendulan group =

The Lavendulan group is a grouping of minerals containing copper and Chloride bearing arsenate and phosphate minerals.

== Lavendulan group members ==
Members of the Lavendulan group include:

- Phosphates:
  - Sampleite: NaCaCu_{5}(PO_{4})_{4}Cl·5H_{2}O
- Arsenates:
  - Lavendulan: NaCaCu_{5}(AsO_{4})_{4}Cl·5H_{2}O
  - Zdenĕkite: NaPbCu_{5}(AsO_{4})_{4}Cl·5H_{2}O

=== Related minerals ===
- Lemanskiite (NaCaCu_{5}(AsO_{4})_{4}Cl·3H_{2}O) is the trihydrate of Lavendulan, further showing a different morphology.
