= Kernowite =

Copper iron arsenate mineral

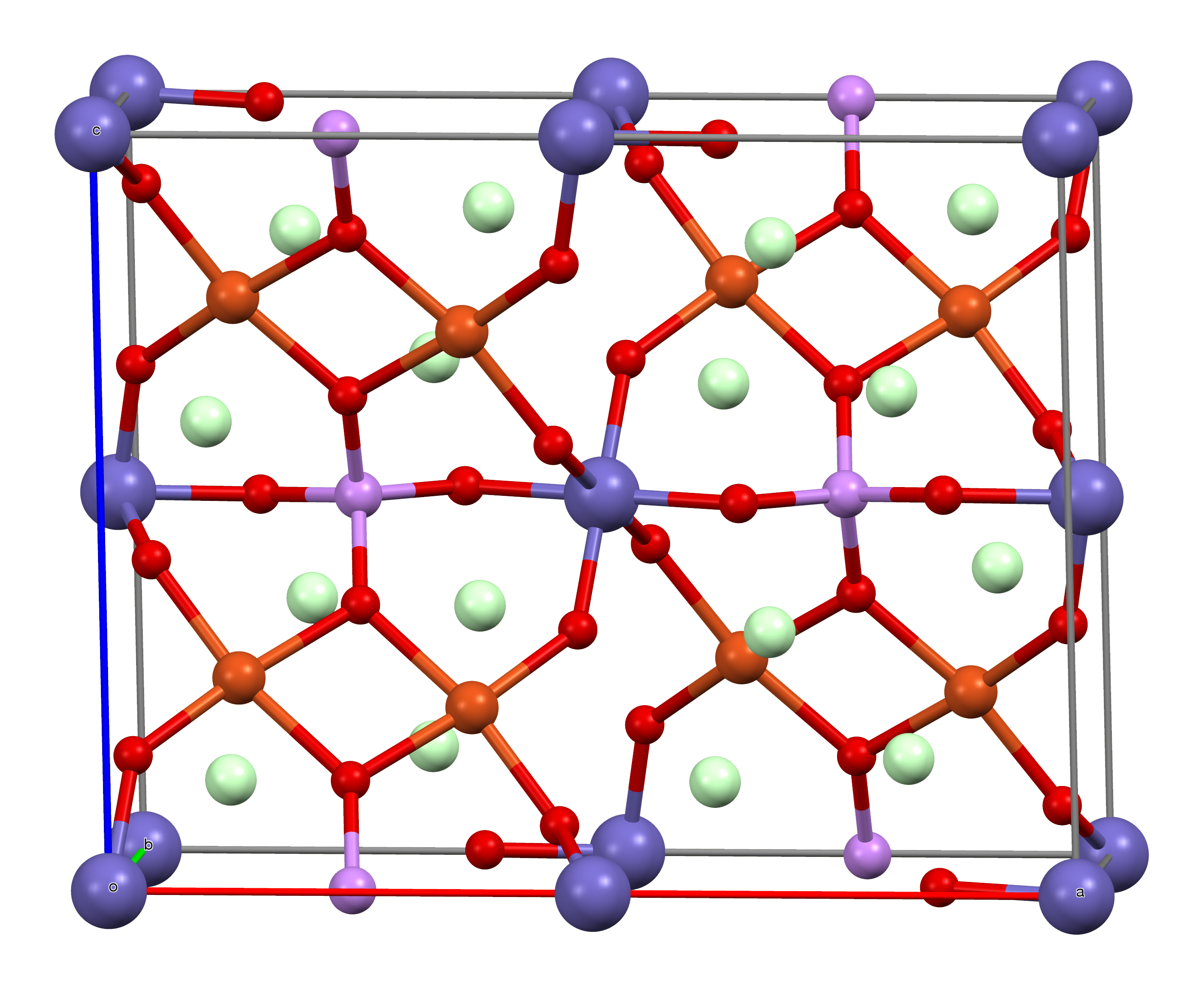
- Unit cell of kernowite, based on X-ray crystallography of the isostructural mineral liroconite.

General
- Category: Arsenate minerals
- Formula: Cu_{2}Fe(AsO_{4})(OH)_{4}·4H_{2}O
- Crystal system: Monoclinic

Kernowite is a mineral which was first described in 2020. It is named for Cornwall, which in the Cornish language is Kernow.

== Description ==
Kernowite is a complex arsenate mineral with the composition Cu_{2}Fe(AsO_{4}(OH))_{4}·4H_{2}O. It was first described in 2020, and is closely related to liroconite, containing iron in the place of aluminium, making it green rather than blue. Its name is derived from Kernow, the name of Cornwall in the Cornish language, after being discovered in a rock mined c.1800 in the Wheal Gorland mine, St Day, Cornwall.

== See also ==
- Cornwallite – a mineral also named after Cornwall
