= Vogue, Cornwall =

Coordinates: 50.239°N 5.193°W

Vogue: Cornish: Fog
- Location within Cornwall
- OS grid reference: SW724425
- Civil parish: St Day
- Unitary authority: Cornwall
- Ceremonial county: Cornwall
- Region: South West
- Country: England
- Sovereign state: United Kingdom

Vogue (Cornish: Fog, meaning blowing house or furnace) is a hamlet in the parish of St Day, Cornwall, England.

== Mining industry ==
At Vogue there was a mine called Wheal an Vogue alias Wheal an Byan, operational from the 17th century to the 19th century, and there were several stamping mills there, called Vogue Stamps, Tollan Vogue Stamps and the Lower Stamps, built circa 1700. The name Vogue itself is the Cornish word for a medieval smelting furnace or blowing house.

== Pub ==
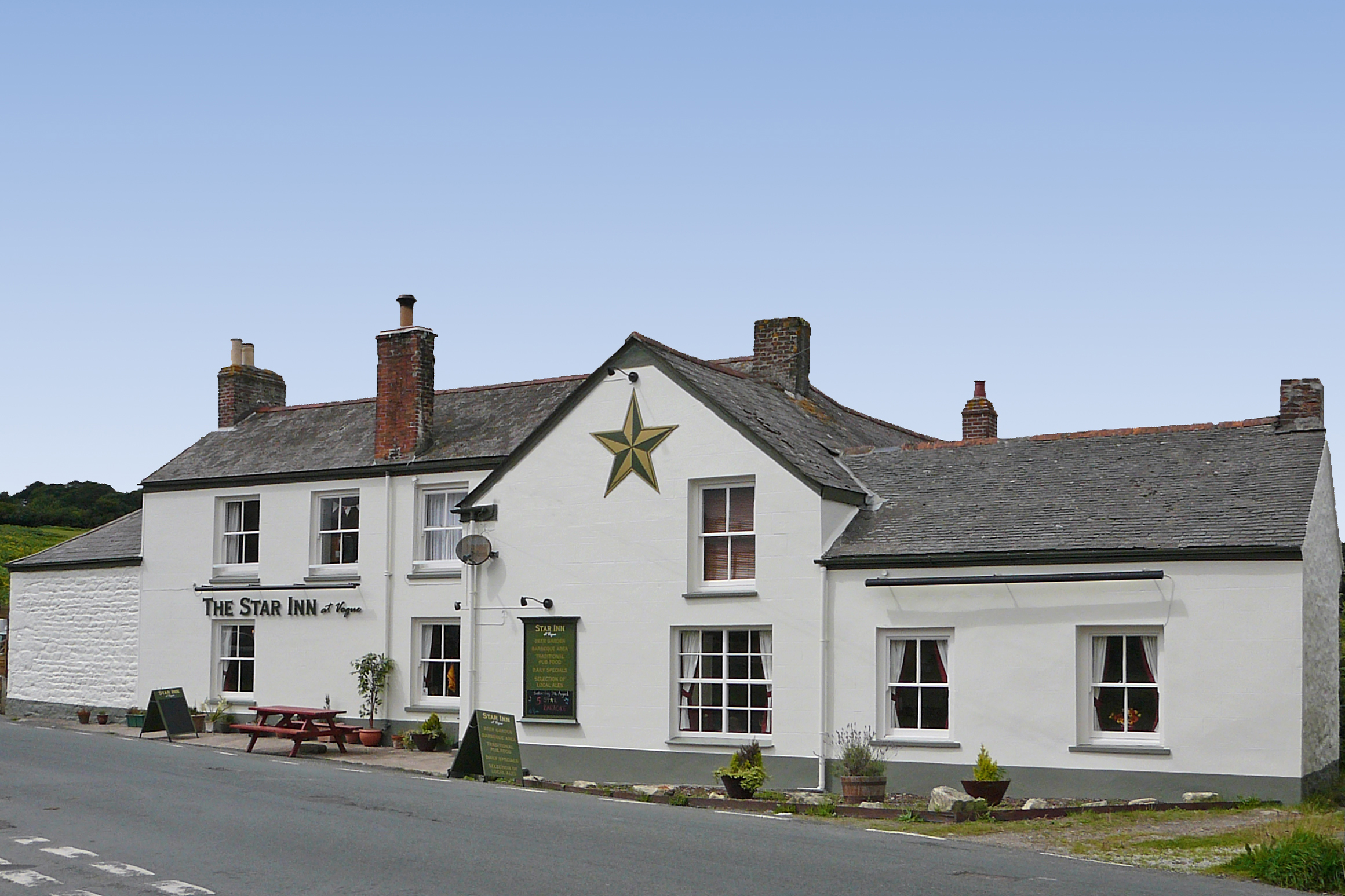
The Star Inn at Vogue

In March 2022, a public house in the village, called "The Star Inn at Vogue", received a cease and desist letter from Condé Nast, owners of the magazine Vogue, asking them to change the pub's name because "as far as the general public is concerned a connection between your business and ours is likely to be inferred". The pub's owners declined to do so. Condé Nast later apologised, saying that "further research by our team would have identified that we did not need to send such a letter on this occasion."

== Cornish wrestling ==
There were many Cornish wrestling tournaments held at the Star Inn for prizes during the 1800s and 1900s.
