= Andrewsite =

Discredited mineral

Andrewsite is a now discredited mineral originally reported at the Wheal Phoenix mine, near Liskeard in Cornwall. It was named for Thomas Andrews FRS, the English chemist.

It has been shown to be a mixture of hentschelite and rockbridgeite, with minor chalcosiderite.
