= Pseudomalachite =

Phosphate mineral

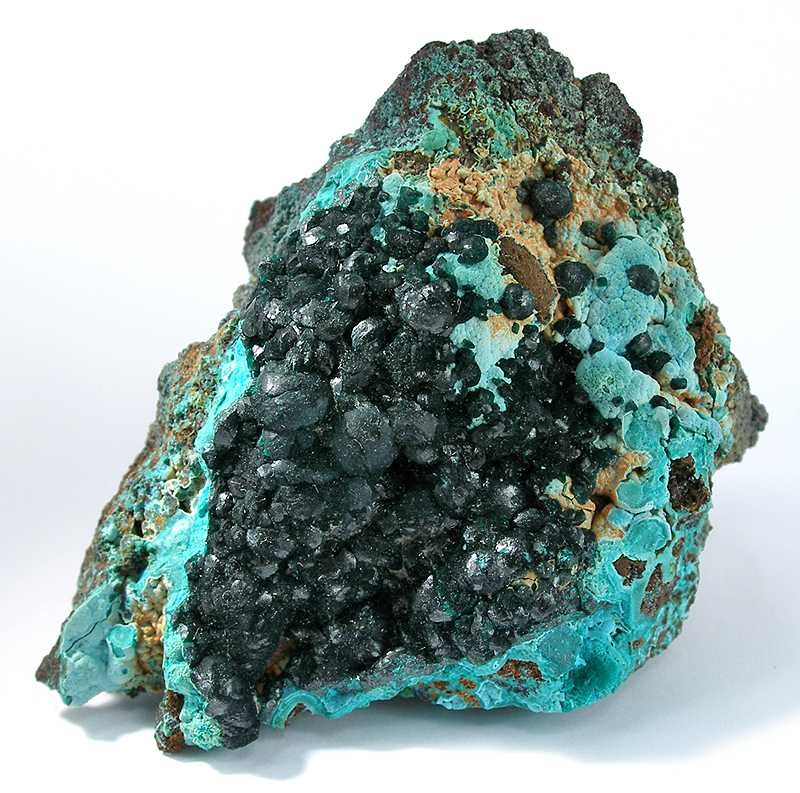

General
- Category: Phosphate minerals
- Formula: Cu_{5}(PO_{4})_{2}(OH)_{4}
- IMA symbol: Pmlc
- Strunz classification: 8.BD.05
- Dana classification: 41.04.03.01
- Crystal system: Monoclinic
- Crystal class: Prismatic (2/m) (same H-M symbol)
- Space group: P2_{1}/c
- Unit cell: a = 4.47 Å, b = 5.75 Å, c = 17.05 Å; β = 91.06°; Z = 2

Identification
- Formula mass: 575.7 g/mol
- Color: Dark emerald green to blackish green
- Crystal habit: Crystals, which are rare, are prismatic, usually with uneven faces. Pseudomalachite is commonly compact, reniform or botryoidal, or it may be fibrous or in crusts and films.
- Twinning: On {100}
- Cleavage: Perfect on {100}, distinct on {010}
- Fracture: Splintery or conchoidal
- Mohs scale hardness: 4.5–5
- Luster: Vitreous
- Streak: Blue green, paler than the mineral
- Diaphaneity: Translucent to subtranslucent
- Specific gravity: (Measured) 4.15 to 4.35
- Optical properties: Biaxial (−)
- Refractive index: n_{α} = 1.791 n_{β} = 1.856 n_{γ} = 1.867
- Birefringence: δ = 0.076
- Pleochroism: Weak; X = bluish green to pale green; Y = yellowish green; Z = deep bluish green to blue-green
- 2V angle: 48°
- Dispersion: Strong r<v. Also biaxial (+) r>v
- Solubility: Soluble in acids but without effervescence (in contrast to malachite which effervesces with warm HCl)
- Other characteristics: Not fluorescent, not radioactive

Pseudomalachite is a phosphate of copper with hydroxyl, named from the Greek for "false" and "malachite", because of its similarity in appearance to the carbonate mineral malachite, Cu_{2}(CO_{3})(OH)_{2}. Both are green coloured secondary minerals found in oxidised zones of copper deposits, often associated with each other. Pseudomalachite is polymorphous with reichenbachite and ludjibaite. It was discovered in 1813. Prior to 1950 it was thought that dihydrite, lunnite, ehlite, tagilite and prasin were separate mineral species, but Berry analysed specimens labelled with these names from several museums, and found that they were in fact pseudomalachite. The old names are no longer recognised by the IMA.

== Type locality ==
The type locality is the Virneberg Mine, Rheinbreitbach, Westerwald, Rhineland-Palatinate, Germany. This is an area of ancient copper mining dating back to Roman times, and worked intermittently up until 1872. The type material is held at the Mining Academy, Freiberg, Germany.

== Structure ==
The copper ions are co-ordinated by six oxygen ions to form distorted octahedra. These octahedra are linked by sharing edges to form two distinct types of infinite chains, parallel to b. The chains are linked alternately, again by sharing octahedral edges, to form sheets parallel to the bc plane. Distorted phosphate tetrahedra link the sheets, and there is some doubt about the exact position of the hydrogen ions in the structure.

== Environment ==
It is a secondary mineral found in the oxidised zones of copper ore deposits. Associated with libethenite at several localities in New South Wales, Australia, and at the Chino Mine, New Mexico, US. Other associated minerals are apatite, azurite, chalcedony, chrysocolla, cornetite, cuprite, malachite, pyromorphite, tenorite, and iron oxyhydroxides.

== Distribution ==
Pseudomalachite has been reported from Argentina, Australia, Austria, Belgium, Brazil, Canada, Chile, Czech Republic, Democratic Republic of Congo, France, Germany, Ireland, Israel, Italy, Japan, Kazakhstan, Madagascar, Mexico, Namibia, Norway, Poland, Portugal, Republic of Congo, Romania, Russia, Slovakia, South Africa, Spain, UK, US and Zambia.
