= Wheal Gorland =

Former metalliferous mine in Cornwall, England

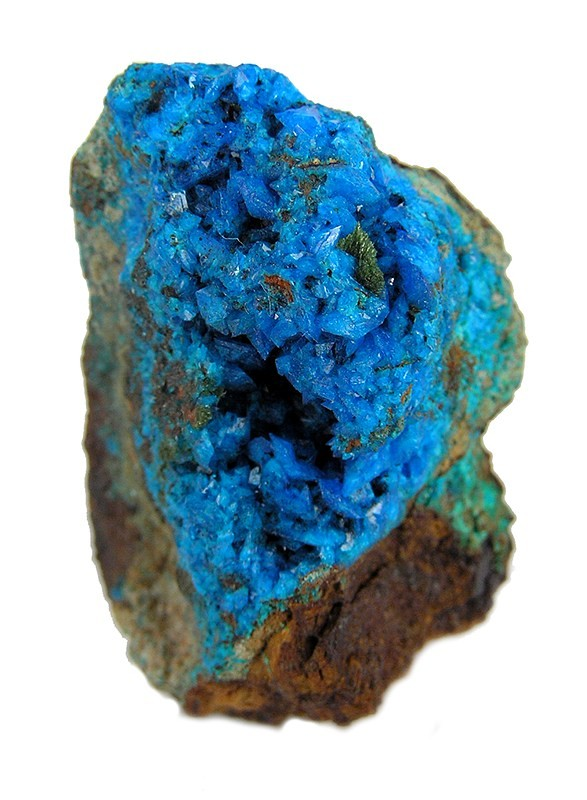
- Liroconite from Wheal Gorland, its type locality

- Location in Cornwall
- Location: St Day, Cornwall, England; 50°14′30″N 5°11′02″W
- Products: Copper, tin, arsenic and tungsten
- Opened: 1792, 1906
- Closed: 1864, 1909

Wheal Gorland was a metalliferous mine located just to the north-east of the village of St Day, Cornwall, in England, United Kingdom. It was one of the most important Cornish mines of the late 18th and early 19th centuries, both for the quantity of ore it produced and for the wide variety of uncommon secondary copper minerals found there as a result of supergene enrichment. It is the type locality for the minerals chenevixite, clinoclase, cornwallite, kernowite and liroconite.

== History ==
The production of the mine was very inconsistent because of the sporadic distribution of its rich ore-bodies: in 1833 George Abbot wrote that it had made profits of over £300,000, produced 1,400 tons of ore per annum, and ranked third, in terms of profits, just behind Dolcoath mine and Consolidated Mines. However, in 1865 Thomas Spargo wrote "now part of St. Day United; idle".

In the early 1790s Wheal Gorland was connected to the Great County Adit and its own existing shallow adits were adapted to drain into this deeper adit. Records show that between 1815 and 1851 the mine produced 40,750 tons of 7½% copper ore, 15 tons of black tin, and 18 tons of arsenic. Much fluorspar was also produced, and gold was reputedly found in the gossan. Records from 1836 show 86 people working at the mine, 53 men, 12 women and 21 children. In 1852 the mine was taken over by the St. Day United Group of mines and it became the main site for maintenance of the Great County Adit, but by 1864 it had been abandoned.

The mine was reopened in 1906 when Edgar Allen and Company reworked the stopes and the dumps for tin and tungsten ores. It sold 164 tons of tungsten ore and 18 tons of black tin before closing, for the last time, in 1909.

Since 1988 the site has been designated as a Site of Special Scientific Interest because of the variety and quality of lead and copper minerals that have been found in the mine dumps. A condition summary compiled on 21 July 2010 reported that the site was in an ″unfavourable declining condition″ because growth of scrubland vegetation was encroaching on to the waste dumps and hindering future excavations in search of minerals for scientific study. The summary further states that the vegetation on the remaining mine dump may also be affecting the minerals themselves, as formation of new soil horizons could affect chemical processes within the dump.

== Mineral Statistics ==
From Robert Hunt's Mineral Statistics of the United Kingdom.

Copper Production (from ticketing records; 1801-1853)
Year(s)	Ore (Tons)	Metal (Tons)	Value (£)	Comment
1801	435.00	39.80	3782.75	Cu est., 6 months only
1802	639.00	63.63	5411.25	Cu est., c 6 months only
1803	881.00	80.54	8119.83	Cu est., c 8 months only
1804	1536.00	123.62	13531.88	Cu est
1805	2242.00	164.81	22443.80	Cu est
1806	2293.00	169.95	16495.40	..
1807	2016.00	159.50	13857.63	Cu partly est
1808	1640.00	151.12	10515.98	Cu est
1809	1198.00	78.01	8185.58	Cu est
1810	1395.00	87.11	7822.83	..
1811	1485.00	82.94	6411.23	..
1812	1438.00	81.65	5695.58	..
1813	1102.00	76.65	6384.83	..
1814	1937.00	86.01	7007.60	..
1815	1394.00	102.06	8221.45	Fluorspar sold at copper ticketings not included
1816	1177.00	85.74	5402.05	Fluorspar sold at copper ticketings not included
1817	1077.00	84.08	6479.90	Fluorspar sold at copper ticketings not included
1818	1491.00	110.75	11288.85	Fluorspar sold at copper ticketings not included
1819	1611.00	124.13	11427.40	..
1820	1568.00	138.90	11363.73	..
1821	1203.00	105.46	7806.60	..
1822	1412.00	144.91	11229.63	..
1823	1386.00	127.34	10432.48	..
1824	1769.00	150.96	12604.23	..
1825	2180.00	155.20	15059.80	..
1826	2986.00	241.83	17943.00	Fluorspar not included
1827	2847.00	214.52	16455.73	Fluorspar not included
1828	2885.00	201.80	15606.30	Fluorspar not included
1829	2190.00	161.47	11974.30	Fluorspar not included
1830	2099.00	164.05	11507.73	Fluorspar not included
1831	1158.00	100.69	6966.85	Fluorspar not included
1832	1238.00	108.70	8163.05	..
1833	1771.00	107.01	8357.83	..
1834	953.00	75.93	5913.60	..
1835	796.00	70.53	5369.18	..
1836	684.00	61.80	5949.95	..
1837	576.00	50.94	3785.08	..
1838	477.00	42.59	3362.03	..
1839	503.00	45.96	3414.15	..
1840	457.00	42.74	3510.75	..
1841	354.00	30.56	2739.83	..
1842	598.00	43.30	3268.35	..
1843	581.00	39.70	2833.40	..
1844	444.00	32.21	2288.20	..
1845	366.00	23.11	1652.43	..
1846	144.00	9.96	676.98	..
1851	93.00	8.19	571.85	From Mineral Statistics
1852	27.00	1.90	160.40	From Alfred Jenkin's tables
1853	8.00	0.42	46.80	..

Tin Production (1888-1919)
Year(s)	Black (Tons)	Stuff (Tons)	Value (£)
1888	no-details	..	..
1889	13.00	308.00	660.00
1890	..	439.00	624.00
1891	..	167.00	200.00
1892	..	60.00	52.00
1893	no-details	..	..
1898	..	154.00	66.00
1899	..	25.00	70.00
1900	..	14.00	13.00
1908	5.90	..	406.00
1909	11.90	..	851.00
1910	13.00	..	1,430.00
1911	3.00	..	327.00
1917	0.25	..	64.00
1918	0.45	..	84.00
1919	no-details	..	..

Arsenic Production (1874-1919)
Year(s)	Ore (Tons)	Value (£)
1874	5.30	5.00
1876	12.30	52.00
1893	no-details	..
1906	4.00	22.00
1907	17.00	353.00
1908	24.00	197.00
1909	56.60	497.00
1910	15.00	90.00
1911	16.00	84.00
1918	no detailed return	..

Tungsten Production (1899-1918)
Year(s)	Ore (Tons)	Value (£)
1899	20.50	6.00
1906	26.70	2,025.00
1907	29.40	3,620.00
1908	36.80	2,334.00
1909	70.50	6,051.00
1910	34.00	2,924.00
1911	11.00	1,158.00
1917	0.60	109.00
1918	0.25	25.00

Employment (1888-1918)
Year(s)	Total	Overground	Underground
1888	7	..	7
1889	16	1	15
1890	14	1	13
1891	6	1	5
1892	3	1	2
1898-1899	2	..	2
1900	1	..	1
1905	24	20	4
1906	54	37	17
1907	80	51	29
1908	88	59	29
1909	99	54	45
1910	66	39	27
1911-1912	61	36	25
1916	2	..	2
1917	2	..	2
1918	2	..	2

== See also ==
- Mining in Cornwall and Devon
- Consolidated Mines
- Poldice mine
- Wheal Jane
