= St Day =

Civil parish and village in Cornwall, England, United Kingdom

Coordinates: 50.239°N 5.184°W

St Day: Cornish: Sen Day
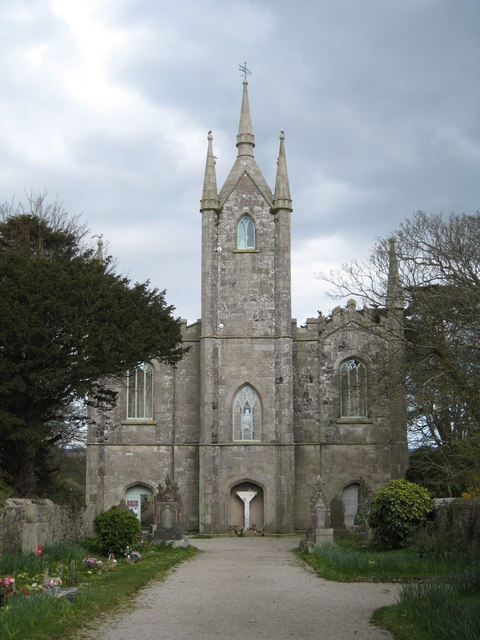
- St Day old church

- Location within Cornwall
- Interactive map of St Day
- OS grid reference: SW730425
- Civil parish: St Day
- Unitary authority: Cornwall
- Ceremonial county: Cornwall
- Region: South West
- Country: England
- Sovereign state: United Kingdom
- Post town: REDRUTH
- Postcode district: TR16
- Dialling code: 01209
- Police: Devon and Cornwall
- Fire: Cornwall
- Ambulance: South Western
- UK Parliament: Camborne and Redruth

St Day (Cornish: Sen Day) is a civil parish and village in Cornwall, England, United Kingdom. It is positioned between the village of Chacewater and the town of Redruth. The electoral ward St Day and Lanner had a population of 4,473 according to the 2011 census.

St Day is in an area that was historically known for mining, encompassing places such as Poldice, Tolcarne, Todpool, Creegbrawse and Crofthandy. The village gained significant wealth from mining activities. It holds a central position within the Cornwall and West Devon Mining Landscape, which is a designated World Heritage Site. This site includes other notable locations such as St Agnes, Chacewater, Chapel Porth and Porthtowan.

== Industrial history ==
St Day served as a hub for the wealthiest and arguably the most renowned copper mining district globally from the 16th century to the 1830s. The population, wealth and activity in St Day declined steadily from about 1870 onwards, today the population is smaller than in 1841. It is now essentially a residential village.

The Wheal Gorland mine is the type locality for the minerals: chenevixite, clinoclase, cornwallite, kernowite, and liroconite.

The population of St Day was 1,821 at the census 2011

== Annual events ==
St Day Feast takes place during the summer in the village and includes, among other things, two formal street dances reminiscent of those in Helston. One of the dances is specifically for children and involves the participation of students from St Day and Carharrack Primary School.

== Sport ==
A St Day mine site has been used for short-oval stock car racing for many years. Stock car drivers from Cornwall have won eleven World Championships.

=== Cornish wrestling ===
There were many Cornish wrestling tournaments for prizes during the 1800s and 1900s, including feast day. Tournaments were held at various venues including the:

- King's Arms Inn at Fair Meadow
- Market House Inn
- Lion Inn
- Field opposite the hotel
- Park Field

See also Wrestling in Vogue.

== Parish church ==
The parish was originally a chapelry of Gwennap but became independent in 1835. In the 13th century there was a chapel dedicated to the Holy Trinity and even earlier there had been a chapel dedicated to St Day which was a great centre of pilgrimage. The saint commemorated here is probably the Breton Saint Dei. St Dei is commemorated on January 18 but the parish feast is at Trinity-tide since the church's dedication is to the Holy Trinity.

The Sans Day Carol or St Day Carol is one of the many Cornish Christmas carols written in the 19th century. This carol and its melody were first transcribed from the singing of Thomas Beard who lived in this parish.
