= Arthurite =

Arsenate mineral

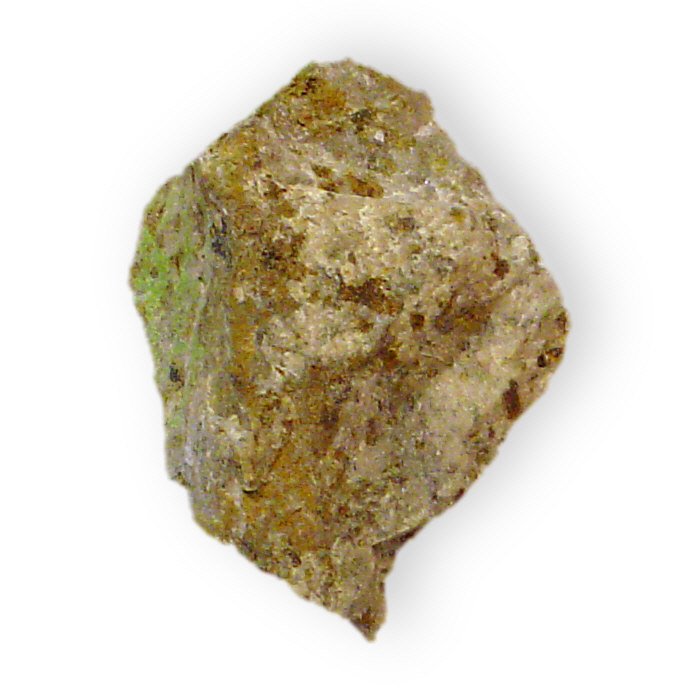

General
- Category: Arsenate minerals
- Formula: CuFe_{2}^{3+}[(OH,O)(AsO_{4},PO_{4},SO_{4})]_{2}·4H_{2}O
- IMA symbol: Atu
- Strunz classification: 8.DC.15
- Crystal system: Monoclinic
- Crystal class: Prismatic (2/m) (same H-M symbol)
- Space group: P2_{1}/c
- Unit cell: a = 10.189(2), b = 9.649(2) c = 5.598(1) [Å] β = 92.16(2)°; Z = 2

Identification
- Color: Apple-green to bluish-green
- Crystal habit: Acicular, prismatic, spherical
- Mohs scale hardness: 3–4
- Luster: vitreous
- Streak: not reported
- Density: D(measured) = ~3.2; D(calculated) = 3.29
- Optical properties: Biaxial (+), may be biaxial (–)
- Pleochroism: X = colorless to pale green; Y = gray-green; Z = olive-green
- 2V angle: ~90°
- Dispersion: r > v
- Absorption spectra: Z > Y > X. α = 1.736 β = 1.767 γ = 1.796
- Other characteristics: Opacity: transparent to translucent

Arthurite is a mineral composed of divalent copper and iron ions in combination with trivalent arsenate, phosphate and sulfate ions with hydrogen and oxygen. Initially discovered by Sir Arthur Russell in 1954 at Hingston Down Consols mine in Calstock, Cornwall, England, arthurite is formed as a resultant mineral in the oxidation region of some copper deposits by the variation of enargite or arsenopyrite. The chemical formula of Arthurite is CuFe_{2}^{3+}(AsO_{4},PO_{4},SO_{4})_{2}(O,OH)_{2}·4H_{2}O.

Arthurite is named after Arthur W. G. Kingsbury (1906–1968), a British mineralogist, and Sir Arthur Russell (1878–1964), a collector of minerals.

== Introduction ==
Arthurite was determined to be a uniquely new mineral by R.J. Davis and M.H. Hey in 1964 after its initial discovery. A second specimen was confirmed by A.H Clark and R.H. Sillitoe (1969) from Potrerillos, Atacama Province, Chile in 1969. Subsequently, several other arthurite-like minerals have been discovered. There are variations in which the copper (Cu) ions are replaced with cobalt (Co), in the case of cobaltarthurite, manganese (Mn) replaces Cu in the case of earlshannonite, iron (Fe) in the case of bendadaite and whitmoreite and zinc (Zn) in the case of ojuelaite. Arthurite is the copper-dominant end-member of the arthurite group.

== Composition ==
The theoretical chemical formula of Arthurite was originally determined to be Cu_{2}Fe_{4}(AsO_{4})_{3}(O,OH)_{7}•6H_{2}O. The breakdown of the composition of arthurite in weight percent oxides is given in Table 1.

Table 1. Chemical composition of Arthurite in weight percent oxides

| Element | Oxide | Theoretical Percentage | Recalculated Percentage |
|---|---|---|---|
| Copper | CuO | 16.00 | 14.5 |
| Iron | Fe_{2}O_{3} | 32.12 | 30.1 |
| Arsenic | As_{2}O_{5} | 34.67 | 34.8 |
| Hydrogen | H_{2}O | 17.21 | 20.6 |
| Sum | | 96.54 | 100 |

Arthurite crystallizes from an aqueous solution with whichever applicable anions are accessible in the solution. These available anions may be carbonate, arsenate, sulphate and phosphate. Some other minerals belonging to the arthurite group are cobaltarthurite, Co^{2+}Fe^{3+}_{2}(AsO_{4})_{2}(OH)_{2}•4H_{2}O, whitmoreite Fe^{2+}Fe^{3+}_{2}(PO_{4})_{2}(OH)_{2}·4H_{2}O, ojuelaite, ZnFe_{2}(AsO_{4})_{2}(OH)_{2}·4H_{2}O, earlshannonite, (Mn,Fe)Fe_{2}(PO_{4})_{2}(OH)_{2}·4H_{2}O and bendadaite, Fe^{2+}Fe^{3+}_{2}(AsO_{4})_{2}(OH)_{2}·4H_{2}O. The optimal compositions of the members of the arthurite group can be represented by A^{2+}Fe^{3+}_{2}(XO_{4})_{2}(OH)_{2}·4H_{2}O and are summarized in Table 2.

Table 2. Compositional breakdown of the arthurite group members

| Mineral | A-site | X-site | Reference |
|---|---|---|---|
| arthurite | Cu^{2+} | As^{5+} | |
| cobaltarthurite | Co^{2+} | As^{5+} | |
| whitmoreite | Fe^{2+} | As^{5+} | |
| ojuelaite | Zn^{2+} | P^{5+} | |
| earlshannonite | Mn^{2+}, Fe^{2+} | P^{5+} | |
| bendadaite | Fe^{2+} | P^{5+} | |

== Structure ==
Arthurite is of the monoclinic space group: P2_{1/c} with a = 10.189(2)Å, b = 9.649(2)Å, c = 5.598(1)Å and β = 92.16(2). The coordination polyhedron of the Cu^{2+} ion is clearly tetragonally lengthened as compared to whitmoreite with the Phosphorus (P) and Arsenic (As). Figure 1 shows the crystal structure of arthurite.

== Physical properties ==
Table 3. General and physical properties of arthurite

| Attribute | Data |
|---|---|
| Chemical formula | CuFe_{2}^{3+}(AsO_{4},PO_{4},SO_{4})_{2}(O,OH)_{2}•4H_{2}O |
| Color | apple-green to bluish green |
| Opacity | transparent to translucent |
| Habit | acicular, prismatic, spherical |
| Hardness | 3–4 (Mohs scale) |
| Luster | Vitreous |
| Optical Class | Biaxial (+), may be biaxial (–) |
| Pleochroism | X = colorless to pale green; Y = gray-green; Z = olive-green |
| Orientation | Y = b; Z ^ c = 10 |
| Absorption | Z > Y > X. α = 1.736 β = 1.767 γ = 1.796 |
| Density | D(meas.) = ~3.2 D(calc.) = 3.29 |
| Space group | P21/c. a = 10.189(2) b = 9.649(2) c = 5.598(1) β = 92.16(2)° Z = 2 |
| 2V calculation | ~90° |

== Geologic occurrence ==
The first specimen on record was sent to the British Museum of Natural History, Department of Mineralogy by Sir Arthur Russell in 1954. The sample specimen was collected by Sir Russell from Hingston Down Consols mine in Calstock, Cornwall, England. A second sample was found in 1966 in the Potrerillos copper deposit, Atacama Province, northern Chile. Each of these locations have porphyritic copper deposits where circulating groundwater interacts with the cooling porphyritic intrusions and their fluids to form copper-bearing minerals and copper ore deposits. The copper ore found at the Chilean site was composed mainly of massive djurleite deposits that strongly oxidized to form goethite, minor cuprite and malachite. The arthurite formed as thin (0.1 – 0.5 mm) and sparsely coated areas growing along the inner walls of minor fractures splitting through malachite-rich encased djurleite forms.

== Biographic sketch ==
Arthurite is named after two people, Arthur William Gerald Kingsbury and Sir Arthur Edward Ian Montagu Russell. Arthur Kingsbury was the son of a farmer in East Meon, Hampshire, England. He attended Bradfield College in Berkshire prior to an apprenticeship at a London law firm. He passed the bar exam in 1929 and became a solicitor at Sherborne and then later Crewkerne in the West of England. He began collecting minerals in 1927. After the war he accepted a position as a research assistant in the mineralogy department of the Oxford University Museum where he added 50 species to the list of minerals known to occur in Great Britain. Sir Arthur Edward Ian Montagu Russell was born in 1878 and became the 6th Baronet of Swallowfield Park Reading when his older brother died in 1944. Sir Arthur attended the prestigious Eton College and then studied chemistry at King's College, London. During his life he amassed an amazing collection of minerals, many from the collections of others, but also from his own field work. When Sir Arthur died in 1964 his collection of 12,000 mineral specimens went to The Natural History Museum in London with the stipulation that the collection not be dispersed, but remain as a British regional collection.
