= Sampleite =

Phosphate mineral

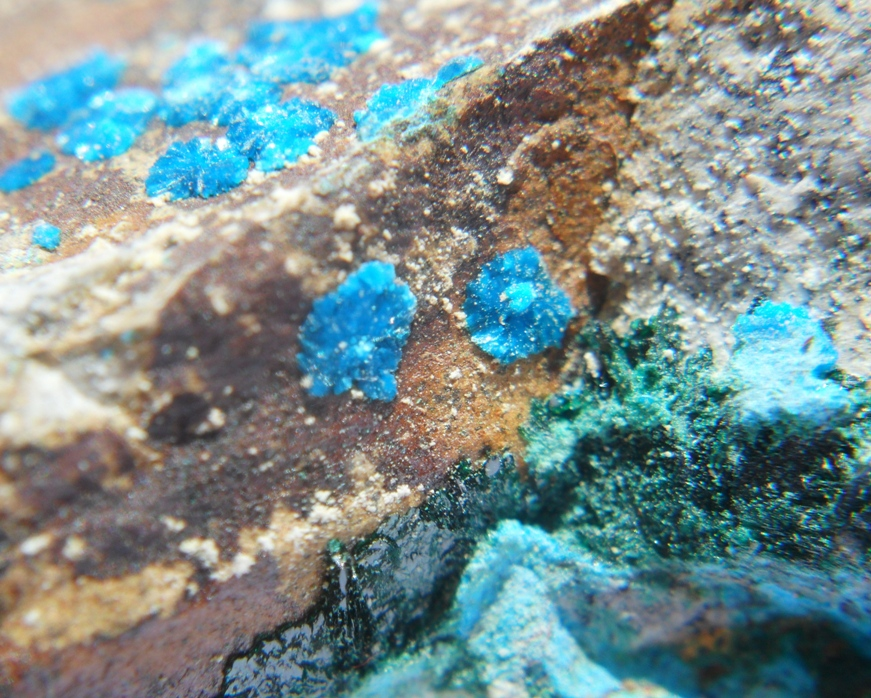

General
- Category: Phosphate minerals
- Formula: NaCaCu_{5}(PO_{4})_{4}Cl•5(H_{2}O)
- IMA symbol: Smp
- Strunz classification: 8.DG.05
- Crystal system: Monoclinic
- Crystal class: Prismatic (2/m) (same H-M symbol)
- Space group: P2_{1}/n or P2_{1}/c
- Unit cell: a = 9.7 Å, b = 38.4 Å c = 9.65 Å; β = 90.07°; Z = 4

Identification
- Formula mass: 875.95 g/mol
- Color: Light blue to blue-green
- Crystal habit: Aggregates, lath, rosette
- Cleavage: Perfect on {010}; good on {100} and {001}
- Mohs scale hardness: 4
- Luster: Pearly
- Streak: Light Blue
- Diaphaneity: Transparent
- Specific gravity: 3.2
- Optical properties: Biaxial (−)
- Refractive index: n_{α} = 1.629 n_{β} = 1.677 n_{γ} = 1.679
- Birefringence: δ = 0.050
- Pleochroism: X = deep blue, blue-green; Y = light blue, turquoise blue; Z = turquoise-blue, colorless
- 2V angle: Measured: 5° to 23°

Sampleite has a general formula of NaCaCu_{5}(PO_{4})_{4}Cl·5(H_{2}O). It was first described in 1942 for an occurrence in Chuquicamata, Chile and was named after Mat Sample, a mine superintendent for the Chile Exploration Company.

Sampleite is monoclinic. It belongs to the space group P2_{1}/n or P2_{1}/c. In a thin section it has a high surface relief and will have sharp boundaries with the surrounding medium. Sampleite is anisotropic and has visible pleochroism and birefringence.

It is characteristically found in earthy crusts in a highly sericitized rock and is present in highly oxidized conditions near the surface. When it occurs as micaceous rosettes and aggregates it can be associated with dendrites of manganese and iron oxides. Sampleite appears to be the most recent mineral deposited with the exception of gypsum.
