= Tyrolite =

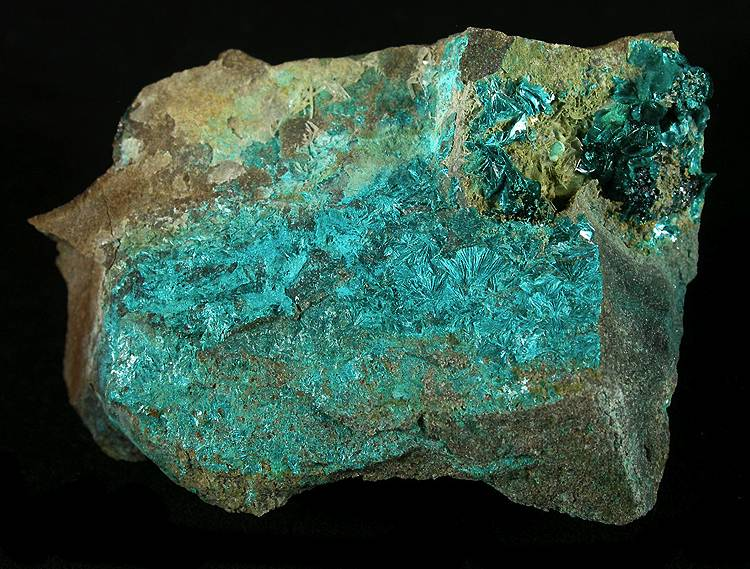

General
- Category: Arsenate and carbonate minerals
- Formula: CaCu_{5}(AsO_{4})_{2}CO_{3}(OH)_{4}·6H_{2}O
- IMA symbol: Tyl
- Strunz classification: 8.DM.10
- Crystal system: Orthorhombic
- Crystal class: Prismatic (2/m) (same H-M symbol)
- Space group: P2/c (no. 13) or C2/c (no. 15)

Identification
- Color: Blue to green
- Crystal habit: Radial or botryoidal
- Mohs scale hardness: 1.5–2.0
- Luster: Vitreous
- Diaphaneity: Translucent
- Specific gravity: 3.1–3.2
- Refractive index: nα = 1.694 nβ = 1.726 nγ = 1.730

Tyrolite is a hydrous calcium copper arsenate carbonate mineral with the formula CaCu_{5}(AsO_{4})_{2}CO_{3}(OH)_{4}⋅6H_{2}O. Tyrolite forms glassy, blue to green orthorhombic radial crystals and botryoidal masses. It has a Mohs hardness of 1.5–2.0 and a specific gravity of 3.1–3.2. It is translucent with refractive indices of nα = 1.694, nβ = 1.726, and nγ = 1.730.

It is a secondary mineral formed by the weathering of associated copper and arsenic minerals. It was first described in 1845 for an occurrence in Schwaz, Tyrol, Austria.

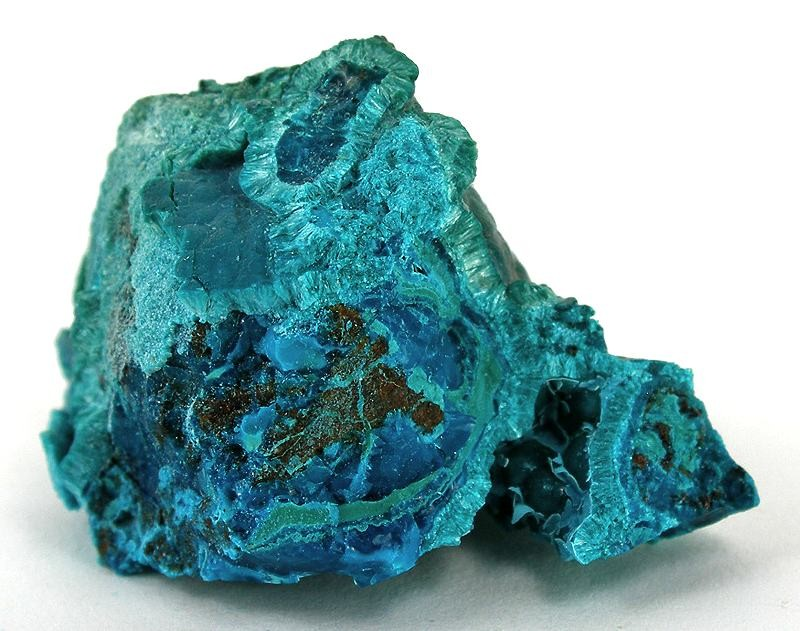
Chrysocolla on tyrolite and clinotyrolite specimen (4.0 cm × 2.6 cm × 2.6 cm (1.6 in × 1.0 in × 1.0 in)); from San Simon Mine in Santa Rosa-Huantajaya District, Iquique Province, Chile. (Click image for details of the mineral chemistry.)

TYROLITE, AZURITE FROM ZAPATCHITZA DEPOSIT, WESTERN STARA PLANINA, BULGARIA - COLL. Y. MINTCHEVA-STEFANOVA AT SOFIA UNIVERSITY "SAINT KLIMENT OHRIDSKI" MUSEUM OF MINERALOGY, PETROLOGY AND MINERAL RESOURCES
