= Parnauite =

Arsenate-sulfate mineral

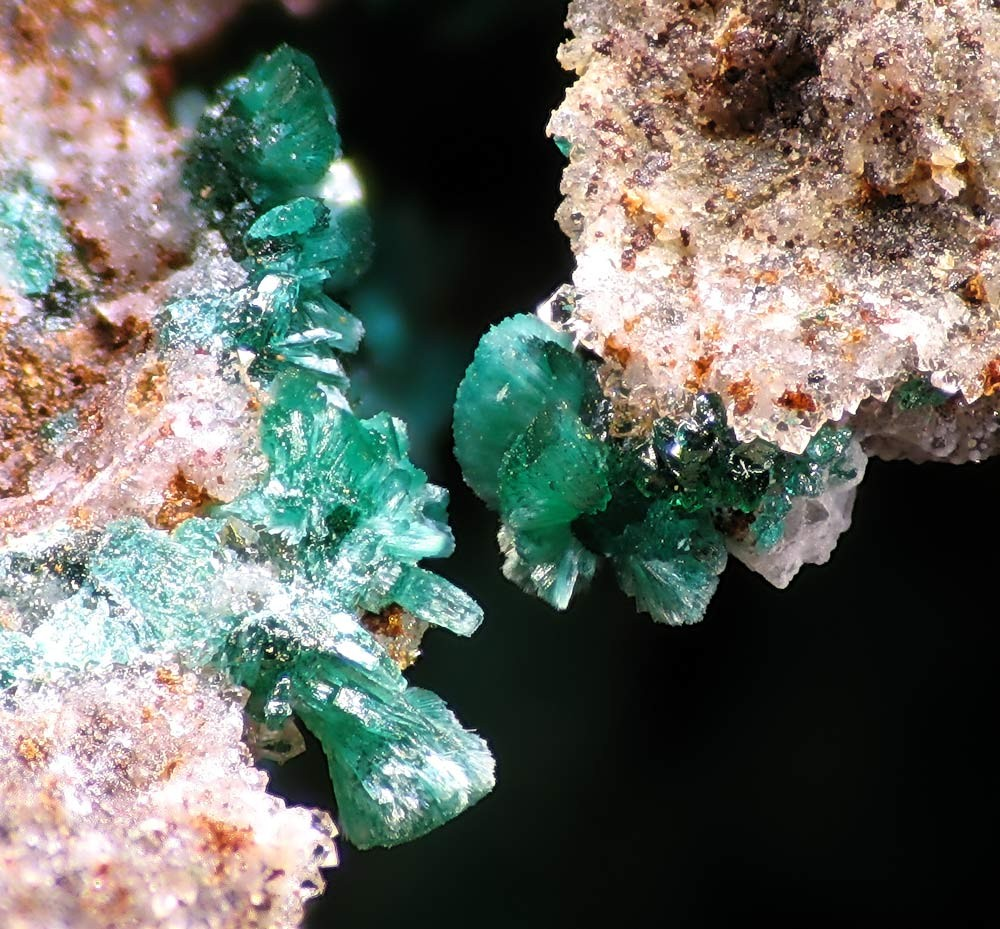
- Parnauite

General
- Category: Arsenate minerals
- Formula: Cu_{9}(AsO_{4})_{2}(SO_{4})(OH)_{10} · 7H_{2}O
- IMA symbol: Pna
- Strunz classification: 8.DF.35
- Dana classification: 43.5.13.1
- Crystal system: Orthorhombic
- Unit cell: 641.15 Å³ (calculated)

Identification
- Color: Pale blue, green, dark green, blue-green, yellow-green
- Crystal habit: Fans and rosettes of lath-like crystals; fibrous; scaly crusts
- Cleavage: Good
- Mohs scale hardness: 2
- Streak: Greenish white
- Specific gravity: 3.09
- Optical properties: Biaxial (−)
- Refractive index: nα = 1.680(3), nβ = 1.704(3), nγ = 1.712(3)
- Birefringence: δ = 0.032
- Pleochroism: Weak
- 2V angle: Measured: 60°(5); calculated: 58°
- Dispersion: r > v (strong)
- Extinction: Optic plane parallel to {100}. X = b, Y = a, Z = c.
- Ultraviolet fluorescence: None
- Common impurities: P, C, Al

Parnauite is a very rare secondary copper arsenate–sulfate mineral. It forms near the Earth's surface in oxidized zones of various copper deposits. These copper minerals are altered by oxygen-rich water and new minerals grow as a thin coatings or small crystal clusters. Parnauite is typically blue-green to green and commonly occurs as tiny bladed crystals in fan-shaped sprays or rosettes. It may also appear as scaly crusts or crystal-like surface films.

== Discovery ==
Parnauite was discovered in 1978 from the Majuba Hill Mine (Antelope Mining District), Pershing County, Nevada. Another new copper arsenate, Goudeyite was also discovered from the same location. This shows that oxidation at Majuba Hill produces an unusually diverse set of secondary copper minerals.

Parnauite was named in honour of U.S. mineral collector John L. "Jack" Parnau. He is credited with collecting many different minerals from Majuba Hill that were later studied and found to be completely new minerals.

Parnauite is also in institutional collections, including the University of California, Santa Barbara, California, and the National Museum of Natural History, Smithsonian Institution in Washington, DC.

Majuba Hill's lithology is composed of small igneous intrusions, often described as a volcanic plugs. It's made up of porphyritic rhyolite and several types of breccia. These minerals helps explain why parnauite forms there. These igneous intrusions were emplaced into older sedimentary strata that is largely made up of shale.

The deposit contains copper and tin mineralization. In many parts of the mine, the ore is strongly oxidized, meaning the original ore minerals have been chemically altered by oxygen-rich water near the surface. This oxidation produces a wide range of secondary copper minerals.

== Chemistry and properties ==
Parnauite is a hydrated copper arsenate–sulfate with the formula Cu_{9}(AsO_{4})_{2}(SO_{4})(OH)_{10}·7H_{2}O. It is made mostly of copper, with arsenic and sulfur bound into oxygen-rich groups, hydroxides, and water molecules.

Under polarized light, parnauite is biaxial negative with weak pleochroism (a slight color change with viewing direction). Because fibrous parnauite can resemble other blue-green secondary copper minerals, identification often requires laboratory testing such as X-ray diffraction.

== Extent ==
Parnauite is very rare and is known only in a relatively small number of locations worldwide. Reported occurrences include:

- Majuba Hill Mine, the Burrus Mine, Nevada
- Grandview Mine, Arizona.
- Small amounts in Colorado and Utah
- Cap Garonne mine in France
- varies locations in the Black Forest in Germany
- Clara Mine in Ľubietová, Slovakia
- The Tynagh mine in County Galway, Ireland
- Several mines in Cornwall and Wales
- Tsumeb area in Namibia.
