= Chrysocolla =

Phyllosilicate mineral

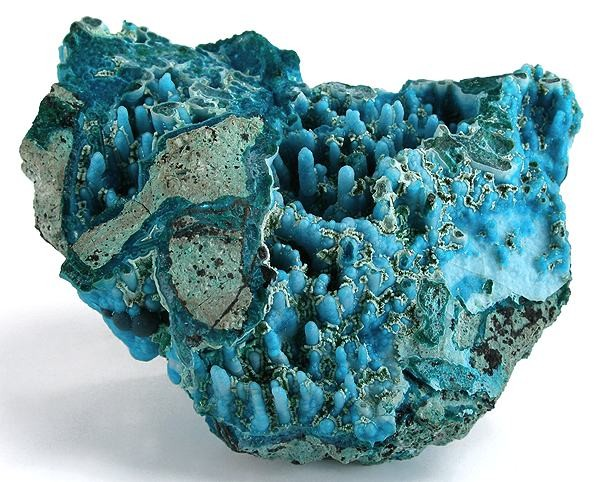
- Chrysocolla specimen from Ray mine, in the Scott Mountain area of Mineral Creek District, Pinal County, Arizona, US

General
- Category: Phyllosilicate minerals
- Formula: Cu_{2 − x}Al_{x}(H_{2}Si_{2}O_{5})(OH)_{4}·nH_{2}O (x < 1)
- IMA symbol: Ccl
- Strunz classification: 9.ED.20
- Crystal system: Orthorhombic; Unknown space group
- Unit cell: a = 5.7 Å, b = 8.9 Å, c = 6.7 Å; Z = 1

Identification
- Color: Blue, cyan (blue-green), green, dark blue to black, brown, rarely yellow
- Crystal habit: Massive, nodular, botryoidal
- Cleavage: none
- Fracture: Irregular/uneven, sub-conchoidal
- Tenacity: Brittle to sectile
- Mohs scale hardness: 2.5–3.5 (7 for chrysocolla chalcedony, high-silica content)
- Luster: Vitreous to dull
- Streak: White to a blue-green color
- Diaphaneity: Translucent to opaque
- Specific gravity: 1.9–2.4
- Optical properties: Biaxial (−)
- Refractive index: n_{α} = 1.575–1.585 n_{β} = 1.597 n_{γ} = 1.598–1.635
- Birefringence: δ = 0.023–0.050

Chrysocolla (/ˌkrɪsəˈkɒlə/ KRIS-ə-KOL-ə) is a hydrous copper phyllosilicate mineral and mineraloid with the formula Cu_{2 – x}Al_{x}(H_{2}Si_{2}O_{5})(OH)_{4}⋅nH_{2}O (x < 1) or (Cu, Al)_{2}H_{2}Si_{2}O_{5}(OH)_{4}⋅nH_{2}O).

The structure of the mineral has been questioned, as a 2006 spectrographic study suggest material identified as chrysocolla may be a mixture of the copper hydroxide spertiniite and chalcedony.

Chrysocolla typically forms amorphously.

== History ==
The name chrysocolla comes from the Ancient Greek χρυσός (khrusós) and κολλα (kolla), meaning "gold" and "glue" respectively, in allusion to the name of the material used to solder gold. The word was first used by Theophrastus in 315 BC.

== Geology ==
Chrysocolla has a cyan (blue-green) color and is a minor ore of copper, having a hardness of 2.5 to 7.0. It is of secondary origin and forms in the oxidation zones of copper ore bodies. Associated minerals are quartz, limonite, azurite, malachite, cuprite, and other secondary copper minerals. It is typically found as botryoidal or rounded masses and crusts, or vein fillings.

A 2006 study has produced evidence that chrysocolla may be a microscopic mixture of the copper hydroxide mineral spertiniite, amorphous silica and water.

== Jewelry ==
Due to being somewhat more common than turquoise, its wide availability, and vivid, beautiful blue and blue-green colors, chrysocolla has been popular for use as a gemstone for carvings and ornamental use since antiquity. It is often used in silversmithing and goldsmithing in place of turquoise and is relatively easy to work and shape. Chrysocolla exhibits a wide range of Mohs hardness ranging from 2 through 7, which is dependent on the amount of silica incorporated into the stone when it is forming. Generally, dark navy blue chrysocolla is too soft to be used in jewelry, while cyan, green, and blue-green chrysocolla can have a hardness approaching 6, similar to turquoise. Chrysocolla chalcedony is a heavily silicified form of chrysocolla that forms in quartz deposits and can be very hard and approach a hardness of 7.

== Gallery ==
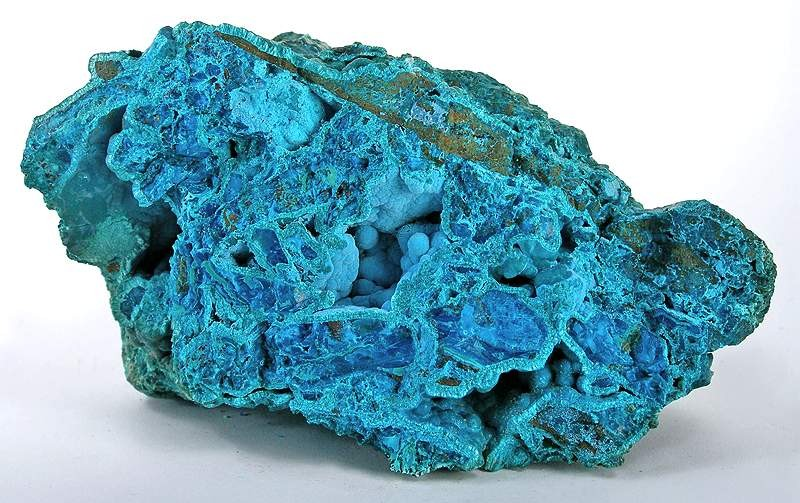
Powder-blue chrysocolla as stalactitic growths and as a thin carpet in vugs inside a boulder of nearly solid tyrolite, from the San Simon Mine, Iquique Province, Chile (size: 14.1 cm × 8.0 cm × 7.8 cm (5.6 in × 3.1 in × 3.1 in))

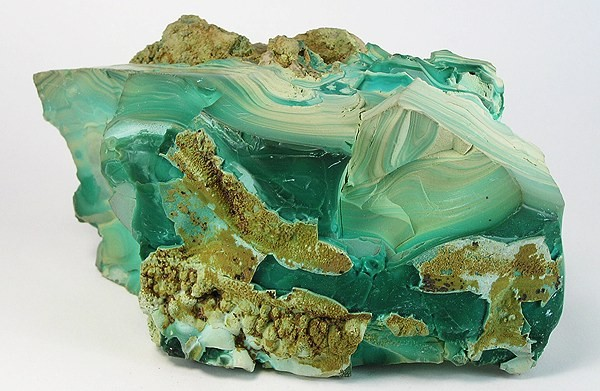
Banded white to blue green chrysocolla, from Bisbee, Arizona (size: 12.2 cm × 5.5 cm × 5.2 cm (4.8 in × 2.2 in × 2.0 in))

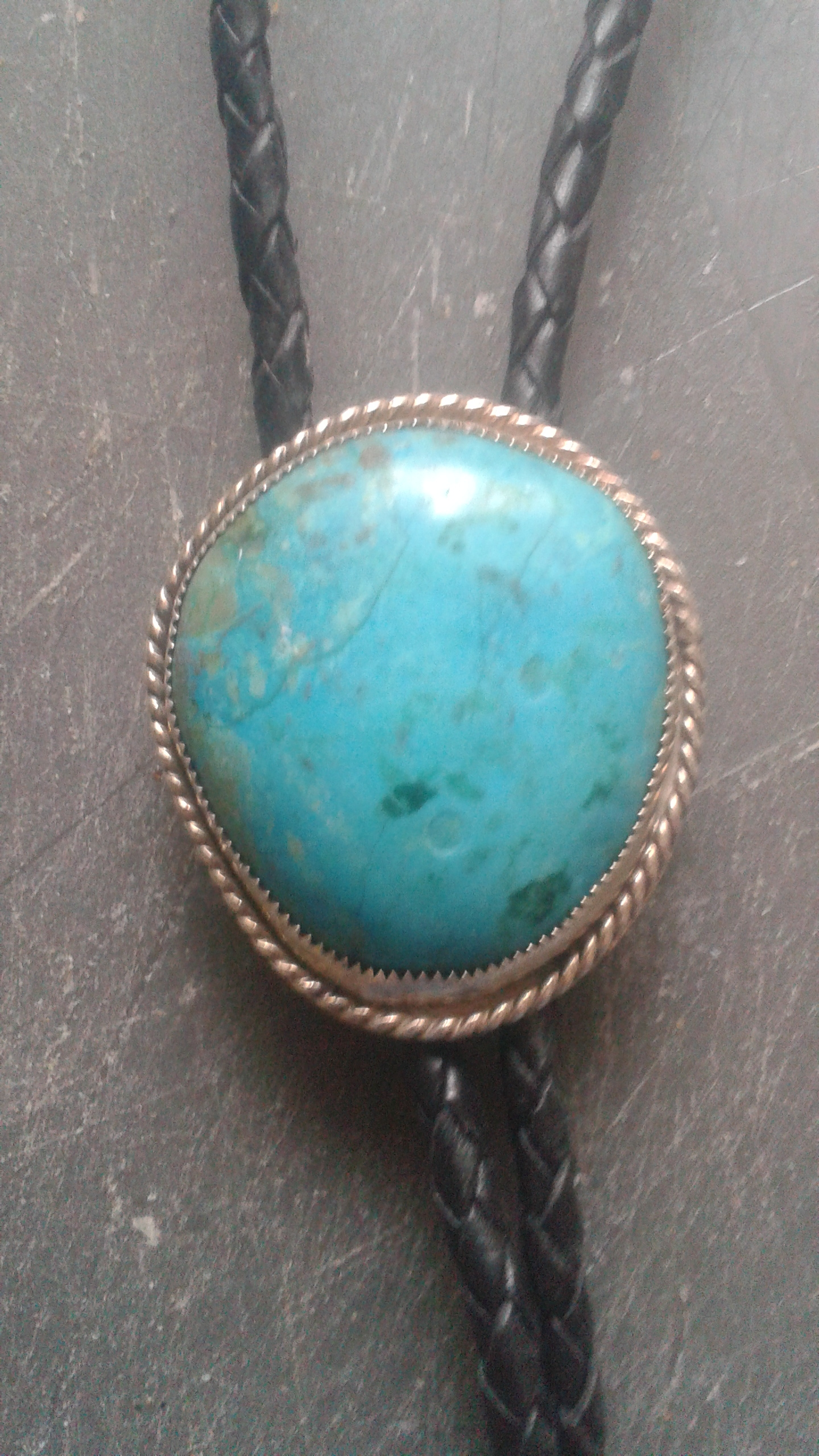
Chrysocolla and silver bolo tie. This chrysocolla specimen is from the Kennecot Copper Mine in Bingham Canyon, West Valley City, Utah.

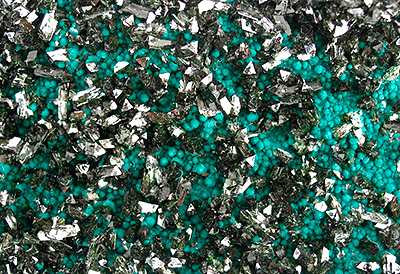
Brochantite (emerald green) and chrysocolla, from the Rokana Mine, Zambian Copperbelt

== See also ==
- Chrysocolla (gold-solder)
