= Clinoclase =

Hydrous copper arsenate mineral

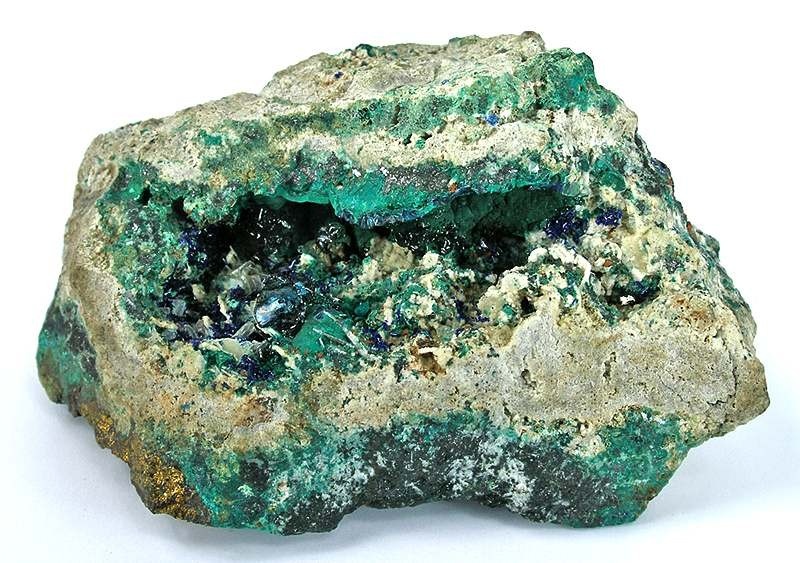
- A sample of clinoclase

General
- Category: Arsenate minerals
- Formula: Cu_{3}AsO_{4}(OH)_{3}
- IMA symbol: Cno
- Strunz classification: 8.BE.20
- Crystal system: Monoclinic
- Crystal class: Prismatic (2/m) (same H-M symbol)
- Space group: P2_{1}/c

Identification

Clinoclase is a hydrous copper arsenate mineral, Cu_{3}AsO_{4}(OH)_{3}. Clinoclase is a rare secondary copper mineral and forms acicular crystals in the fractured weathered zone above copper sulfide deposits. It occurs in vitreous, translucent dark blue to dark greenish blue colored crystals and botryoidal masses. The crystal system is monoclinic 2/m. It has a hardness of 2.5–3 and a relative density of 4.3. Associated minerals include malachite, olivenite, quartz, limonite, adamite, azurite, and brochantite among others.

Clinoclase was discovered in 1830 in the county of Cornwall in England. Found at Broken Hill New South Wales, Australia and associated with copper ore deposits in Arizona, California, Montana, New Mexico, Nevada, and Utah in the United States. Also found in France, Germany, Czech Republic, Austria, Romania, Russia, and the Democratic Republic of the Congo.

Abichite is another name for clinoclase.

The type locality for clinoclase is the Wheal Gorland mine at St Day, Cornwall in the United Kingdom.

== See also ==
- List of minerals
