= Cuprite =

Oxide mineral

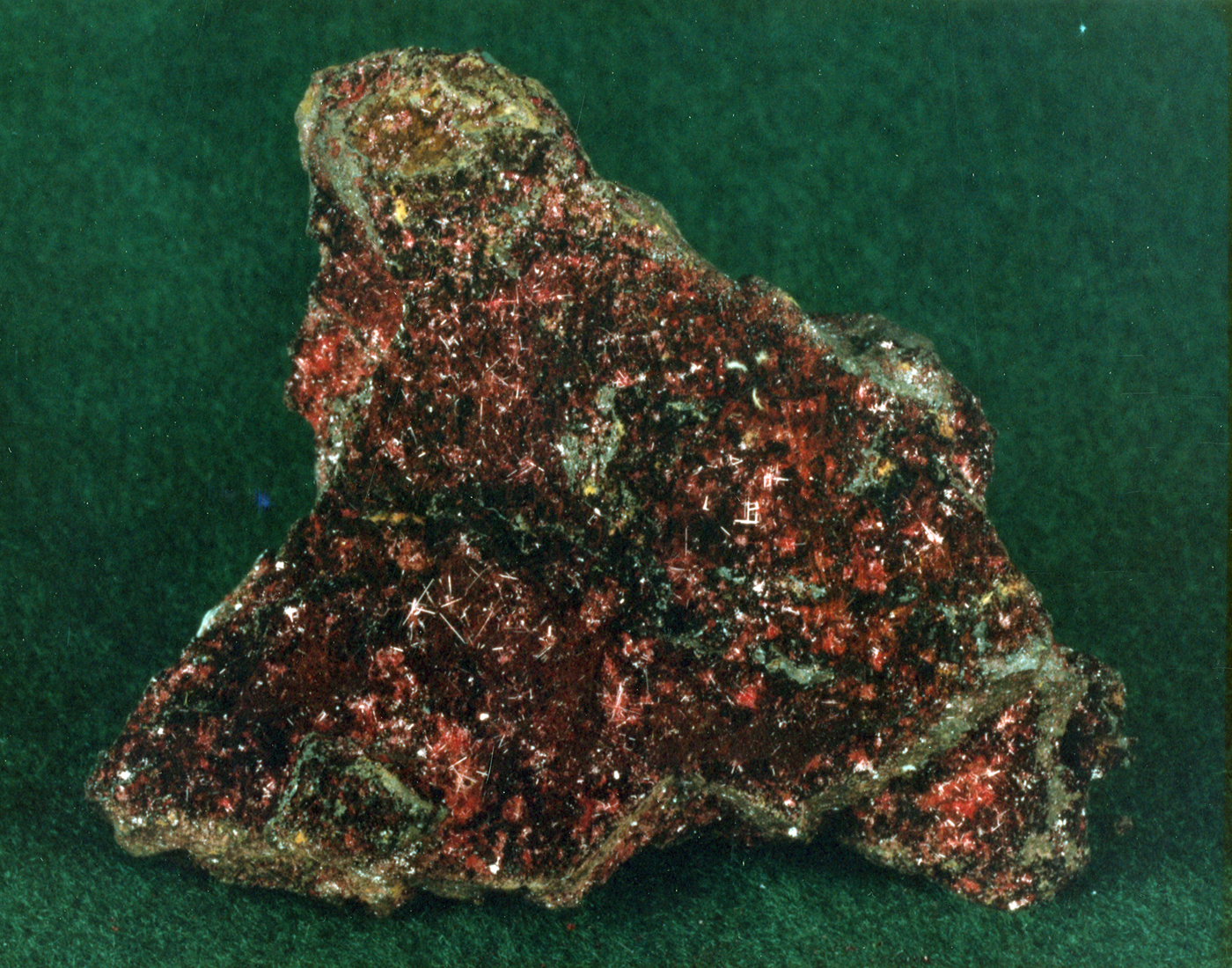
- Cuprite from Morenci, Arizona

General
- Category: Oxide mineral
- Formula: Cu_{2}O
- IMA symbol: Cpr
- Strunz classification: 4.AA.10
- Dana classification: 4.1.1.1
- Crystal system: Cubic
- Crystal class: Hexoctahedral (m3̅m); H-M symbol: (4/m 3̅ 2/m)
- Space group: Pn3̅m
- Unit cell: a = 4.2685 Å; V = 77.77 Å^{3}; Z = 2

Identification
- Color: Dark red to cochineal red, sometimes almost black
- Crystal habit: Cubic, octahedral, and dodecahedral crystals; as hairlike capillary forms, earthy, compact granular and massive
- Twinning: Penetration twins
- Cleavage: Fair in four directions forming octahedrons
- Fracture: Conchoidal to uneven
- Tenacity: Brittle
- Mohs scale hardness: 3.5 to 4
- Luster: Adamantine, sub-metallic, earthy
- Streak: Shining metallic brownish-red
- Diaphaneity: Transparent, translucent
- Specific gravity: 6.14
- Optical properties: Isotropic
- Refractive index: n = 2.849
- Pleochroism: Visible

Cuprite is an oxide mineral composed of copper(I) oxide Cu_{2}O, and is a minor ore of copper.

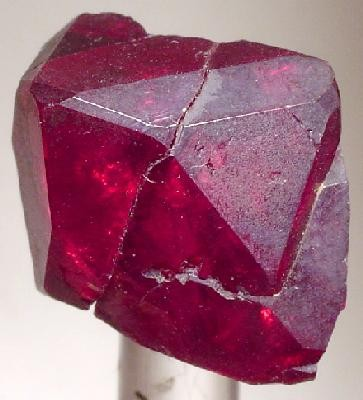
Cuprite from Tsumeb Mine (size:2.3 x 2.1 x 1.2 cm

Its dark crystals with red internal reflections are in the isometric system hexoctahedral class, appearing as cubic, octahedral, or dodecahedral forms, or in combinations. Penetration twins frequently occur. In spite of its nice color, it is rarely used for jewelry because of its low Mohs hardness of 3.5 to 4. It has a relatively high specific gravity of 6.1, imperfect cleavage and is brittle to conchoidal fracture. The luster is sub-metallic to brilliant adamantine. The "chalcotrichite" (from Ancient Greek: χαλκός θρίξ, literally "copper hair", or "plush copper ore") variety typically shows greatly elongated (parallel to [001]) capillary or needle like crystals forms.

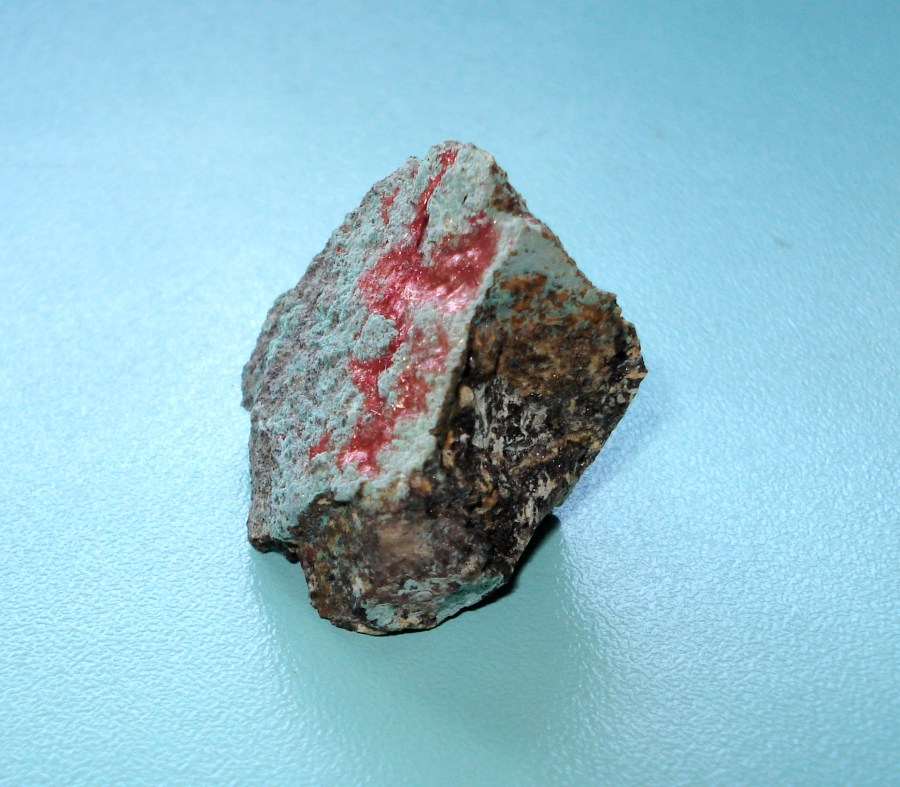
Chalcotrichite from Ray, Arizona

It is a secondary mineral which forms in the oxidized zone of copper sulfide deposits. It frequently occurs in association with native copper, azurite, chrysocolla, malachite, tenorite and a variety of iron oxide minerals. It is known as ruby copper due to its distinctive red color.

Cuprite was first described by Wilhelm Karl Ritter von Haidinger in 1845 and the name derives from the Latin cuprum for its copper content.

Cuprite is found in the Ural Mountains, Altai Mountains, and Sardinia, and in more isolated locations in Cornwall, France, Arizona, Chile, Bolivia, and Namibia.

== As a gemstone ==
Though almost all crystals of cuprite are far too small to yield faceted gemstones, one unique deposit from Onganja in Seeis, Namibia, which was discovered in the 1970s, has produced crystals which were both large and gem quality. Virtually every faceted stone over one carat (0.2 g) in weight is from this single deposit, which has long since been mined out. The number of faceted gems over two carats (0.4 g) is difficult to estimate, but according to Joel Arem, one-time curator for the Smithsonian National Gem and Mineral Collection in Washington, D.C., faceted cuprite of any size is considered one of the most collectible and spectacular gems in existence, with its deep garnet coloring and higher brilliance than a diamond. Only the gem's soft nature prevents it from being among the most valuable jewelry stones.

== See also ==
- Bornite
- Tennantite
- Tenorite CuO
- Tetrahedrite
