= Olivenite =

Copper arsenate mineral

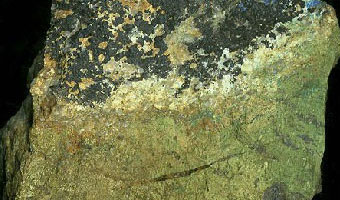
- Olivenite, Špania Dolina, Slovakia

General
- Category: Arsenate minerals
- Formula: Cu_{2}AsO_{4}OH
- IMA symbol: Oli
- Strunz classification: 8.BB.30
- Dana classification: 41.06.06.01
- Crystal system: Monoclinic
- Crystal class: Prismatic (2/m) (same H-M symbol)
- Space group: P2_{1}/n

Identification
- Color: Olive green to yellow or brown, gray-green, grayish white
- Crystal habit: Fibrous, globular and reniform; granular, earthy, massive
- Twinning: On {010}
- Cleavage: {101}, {110}, indistinct
- Fracture: Conchoidal to irregular
- Mohs scale hardness: 3
- Luster: Adamantine to vitreous, pearly to silky if fibrous
- Streak: Olive-green to brown
- Diaphaneity: Translucent to opaque
- Specific gravity: 4.46
- Optical properties: Biaxial (+/−)
- Refractive index: nα = 1.747 – 1.780 nβ = 1.788 – 1.820 nγ = 1.829 – 1.865
- Birefringence: δ = 0.082 – 0.085
- Pleochroism: Weak green and yellow
- 2V angle: Measured: 80° to 90°, Calculated: 46° to 84°
- Dispersion: strong r > v or r < v

Olivenite is a copper arsenate mineral, formula Cu_{2}AsO_{4}OH. It crystallizes in the monoclinic system (pseudo-orthorhombic), and is sometimes found in small brilliant crystals of simple prismatic habit terminated by domal faces. More commonly, it occurs as globular aggregates of acicular crystals, these fibrous forms often having a velvety luster; sometimes it is lamellar in structure, or soft and earthy.

A characteristic feature, and one to which the name alludes (German, Olivenerz, of A. G. Werner, 1789), is the olive-green color, which varies in shade from blackish-green in the crystals to almost white in the finely fibrous variety known as woodcopper. The hardness is 3, and the specific gravity is 4.3. The mineral was formerly found in some abundance, associated with limonite and quartz, in the upper workings in the copper mines of the St Day district in Cornwall; also near Redruth, and in the Tintic Mining District in Utah. It is a mineral of secondary origin, a result of the oxidation of copper ores and arsenopyrite.

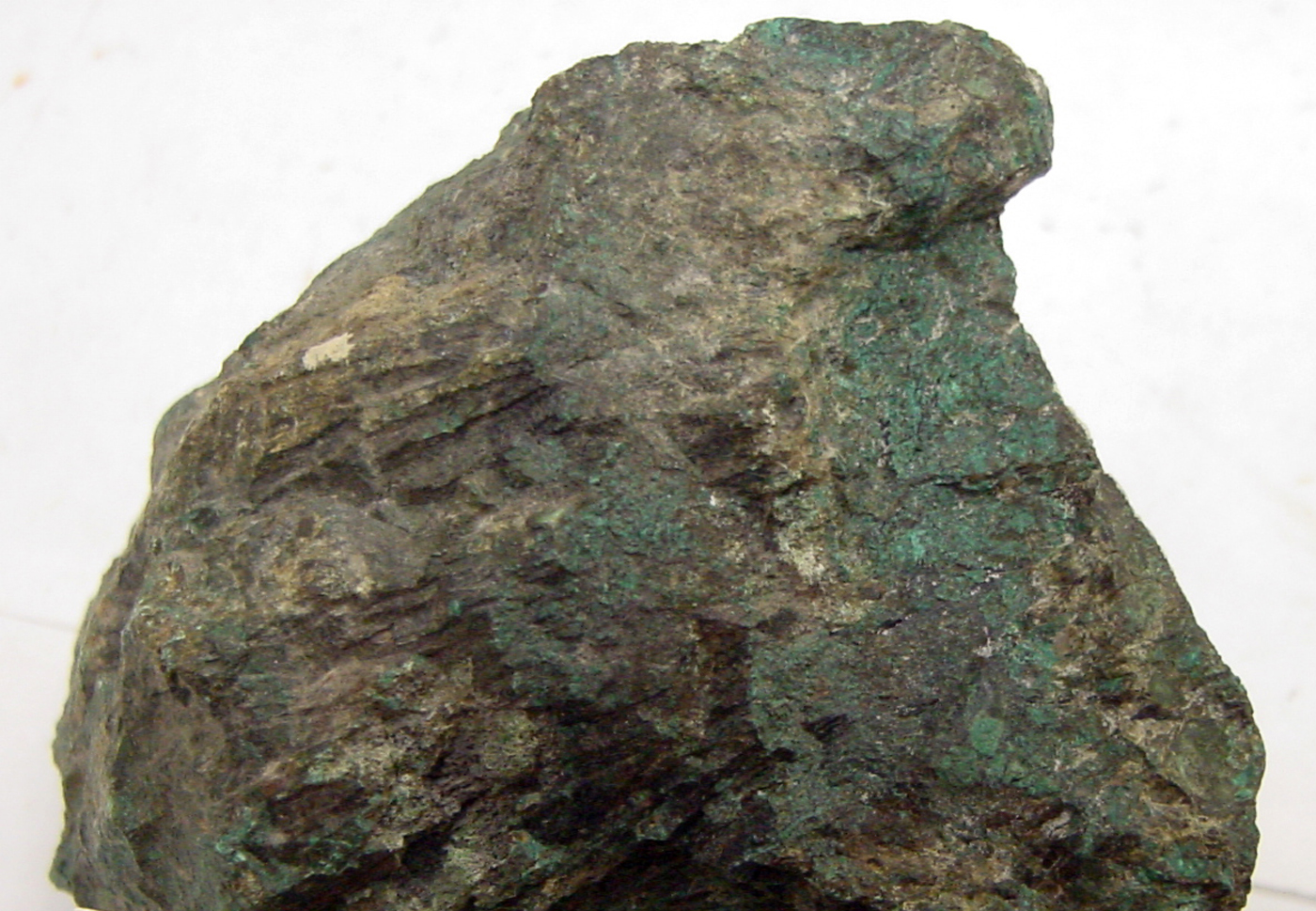
Olivenite from Mammoth Mine, Tintic, Utah

The arsenic of olivenite is sometimes partly replaced by a small amount of phosphorus, and in the species libethenite we have the corresponding copper phosphate Cu_{2}PO_{4}OH. This is found as small dark green crystals resembling olivenite at Ľubietová in the Slovak Republic, and in small amount also in Cornwall. Other members of this isomorphous group of minerals are adamite, Zn_{2}AsO_{4}OH, and eveite, Mn_{2}AsO_{4}OH.
