= Carbon Mineral Challenge =

Citizen science project

The Carbon Mineral Challenge is a citizen science project dedicated to accelerating the discovery of carbon-bearing minerals. The program launched in 2015 December with sponsorship from the Deep Carbon Observatory. The project ended in 2019 September, with 31 new carbon-bearing minerals found from 27 locations.

== Background ==
Mineralogist Robert Hazen and his colleagues pioneered the concept of mineral evolution to explain how life and geology have intertwined throughout Earth's multi-billion year past. As part of that research, the group developed a model that combines the locations and distributions of known minerals to predict the number of unknown carbon minerals on Earth. The method is similar to statistical methods used in biology. Hazen and his group predicted that 145 carbon minerals remain undiscovered on Earth.

A paper supporting the research, "Carbon Mineral Ecology", was published by American Mineralogist in 2015, and the Carbon Mineral Challenge was announced in 2015 at the American Geophysical Union Fall Meeting in San Francisco. Geochemist Daniel Hummer (Southern Illinois University) is the project lead.

Carbon is the focus of the project due to the element's importance to life on Earth and how little is known about it.

== Research Method ==
The research behind the Carbon Mineral Challenge is based on a type of analysis called large number of rare events (LNRE) modeling. To arrive at their total of 145 previously undescribed carbon minerals, Hazen and his colleagues, including mathematician Grethe Hystad of Purdue University-Calumet, focused on diversity-distribution relationships of the 403 known carbon-bearing minerals. Using 82,922 pieces of data about mineral species and localities, tabulated in mindat.org (as of 1 January 2015), the researchers found that all carbon-bearing minerals, as well as subsets containing carbon with hydrogen, calcium, sodium, or oxygen, conform to LNRE distributions. This method of analysis is often used in microbiology to estimate new species.

Hazen likens this method of modeling to reading a book. "Some words you read over and over throughout, such as 'and' and 'the.' These common words are everywhere and easy to spot," says Hazen. "On the other hand, there are words that may appear only one or two times in an entire book. Earth's missing minerals are like these rare words; we haven't found them yet because they formed only in very few places and in very small quantities."

The researchers note that 145 is a minimum estimate of undiscovered carbon-bearing minerals for two reasons. First, the calculation is based on the assumption that minerals will continue to be discovered using exactly the same procedures. However, new techniques and emerging technology are expected to boost the rate of discovery. Second, the data from mindat.org underreports the numbers of rarest minerals found at exactly one or two localities; a bias that results in lower estimates of undiscovered minerals.

Hazen and his colleagues continue to explore big-data mineralogy in a project called "The Co-Evolution of the Geo- and Biospheres: An Integrated Program for Data-Driven, Abductive Discovery in the Earth Sciences".

== How the Project Works ==
To register a new carbon mineral with the project, mineralogists are asked to adhere to the protocol outlined by the International Mineralogical Association Commission on New Minerals, Nomenclature and Classification. Once a carbon mineral is approved by that body, the team responsible for the mineral's discovery submits their finding via a form on the project's website. As of December 2015 there were 405 known and catalogued carbon minerals.

The project focuses both on new discoveries in the field and analyses of samples already in storage in museums and other institutions. Thirty-one new carbon minerals have been described since the project's launch. While two minerals, abellaite and parisite-(La), have chemistry that was predicted by the research team, there have been some unexpected finds, including the mineral leószilárdite, a uranyl carbonate, and tinnunculite which is an organic mineral.

The mineral analysis by Hazen and his colleagues provides some clues about promising locations to look for new carbon minerals and predicts their chemical makeup

== List of new minerals found ==
The following new minerals were found by the project:

- Abellaite
- Akopovaite
- Alterite
- Aravaite
- Braunerite
- Davidbrownite-(NH4)
- Edscottite
- Ewingite
- Fiemmeite
- Lazaraskeite
- Léoszilárdite
- Marchettiite
- Markeyite
- Marklite
- Metauroxite
- Meyrowitzite
- Middlebackite
- Natromarkeyite
- Paddlewheelite
- Parisite-(La)
- Phoxite
- Pseudomarkeyite
- Ramazzoite
- Roymillerite
- Šlikite
- Somersetite
- Stracherite
- Tinnunculite
- Triazolite
- Uroxite
- Wampenite

== See also ==
- Abiogenesis – Life arising from non-living matter
- Amateur geology – Non-professional study and collecting of rocks and minerals
- International Mineralogical Association – Scientific organization promoting mineralogy
- List of minerals recognized by the International Mineralogical Association
- Mineral collecting – Hobby of systematically collecting, identifying and displaying mineral specimens
- Mineral ecology – Chemical elements essential for life
