= Classification of organic minerals =

List of IMA recognized minerals and groupings

Some organic compounds are valid minerals, recognized by the CNMNC (IMA).

== Nickel–Strunz classification −10- Organic compounds ==
- Abbreviations:
  - "*" – discredited (IMA/CNMNC status).
  - "?" – questionable/doubtful (IMA/CNMNC status).
- Nickel–Strunz code scheme: NN.XY.##x
  - NN: Nickel–Strunz mineral class number
  - X: Nickel–Strunz mineral division letter
  - Y: Nickel–Strunz mineral family letter
  - ##x: Nickel–Strunz mineral/group number, x add-on letter

=== Class: organic compounds ===
- 10.A Salts of organic acids
  - 10.AA Formates, Acetates, etc.: 05 formicaite, 10 dashkovaite, 20 acetamide, 25 calclacite, 30 paceite, 35 hoganite
  - 10.AB Oxalates: 05 humboldtine, 05 lindbergite; 10 glushinskite, 15 moolooite, 20 stepanovite, 25 minguzzite, 30 wheatleyite, 35 zhemchuzhnikovite, 40 weddellite, 45 whewellite, 50 caoxite, 55 oxammite, 60 natroxalate, 65 coskrenite-(Ce), 70 levinsonite-(Y), 75 zugshunstite-(Ce), 80 novgorodovaite
  - 10.AC Benzene Salts: 05 mellite, 10 earlandite, 15 pigotite?
  - 10.AD Cyanates: 05 julienite*, 10 kafehydrocyanite*
- 10.B Hydrocarbons
  - 10.BA Hydrocarbons: 05 fichtelite, 10 hartite, 15 dinite*, 20 idrialite, 25 kratochvilite, 30 karpatite, 35 phylloretine?, 40 ravatite, 45 simonellite, 50 evenkite
- 10.C Miscellaneous organic minerals
  - 10.C amber*
  - 10.CA Miscellaneous organic materials: 05 refikite, 10 flagstaffite, 15 hoelite, 20 abelsonite, 25 kladnoite; 30 tinnunculite, 30 guanine; 35 urea, 40 uricite
