= Wampenite =

Rare organic mineral

General
- Category: Organic mineral
- Formula: C_{18}H_{16}
- IMA symbol: Wpn
- Crystal system: Monoclinic
- Crystal class: Prismatic (2/m) (same H-M symbol)
- Space group: P2_{1}/a
- Unit cell: a = 6.73 Å, b = 8.69 Å c = 23.71 Å, β = 90.12^{o} (approximated)

Identification

Wampenite is a rare organic mineral with the formula C_{18}H_{16}, found in Wampen, Fichtelgebirge, Bavaria, Germany.

== Similar minerals ==
Although structurally unique, chemically wampenite is similar to other minerals, like fichtelite, kratochvílite, ravatite, phylloretine, and simonellite.
