= Classification of minerals =

The classification of minerals is a process of determining to which of several groups minerals belong based on their chemical characteristics. Since the 1950s, this classification has been carried out by the International Mineralogical Association, which classifies minerals into the following broad classes:

- Classification of non-silicate minerals
- Classification of silicate minerals
- Classification of organic minerals

== See also ==
- List of minerals
