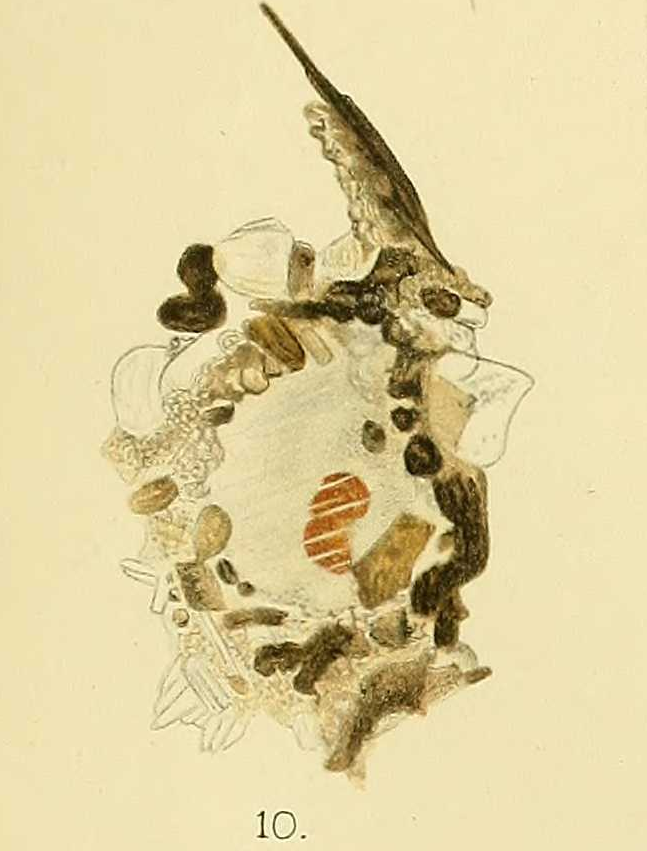
- Iridia diaphana

Scientific classification
- Domain: Eukaryota
- Clade: Sar
- Clade: Rhizaria
- Phylum: Retaria
- Subphylum: Foraminifera
- Class: Monothalamea
- Order: Astrorhizida
- Family: Saccamminidae
- Subfamily: Tholosininae
- Genus: Iridia; Heron-Allen & Earland, 1914

Type species
- Iridia diaphana Heron-Allen & Earland, 1914

Species
- Iridia convexa; Iridia diaphana; Iridia lucida; Iridia serialis

= Iridia =

Genus of foraminifera

Iridia is a genus of foraminifera belonging to the subfamily Tholosininae. It contains four species. The first species, I. diaphana, was discovered in the Querimba archipelago by scientists Edward Heron-Allen and Arthur Earland, who first described the genus in 1914.
