= Oxalate sulfate =

Mixed anion compounds

Oxalate sulfates are mixed anion compounds containing oxalate and sulfate. They are mostly transparent, and any colour comes from the cations.

Related compounds include the sulfite oxalates and oxalate selenates.

== Production ==
Oxalate sulfates may be deposited from a solution in water of the metal anions and sulfate with oxalic acid when evaporated. Crystals formed this way may be hydrates.

== Properties ==
Many crystal forms are non-centrosymmetric and have non-linear optical properties.

When heated, oxalate sulfates will first dehydrate, and then give off carbon dioxide.

== List ==
name	formula	system	space group	unit cell Å	volume	density	comment	ref
lithium sulfate monohydrate oxalate	?	triclinic	P1	a = 3.4014 b = 5.0397 c = 6.120 α = 78.62° β= 84.95° γ = 81.14°	101.45		band gap 4.57 eV dielectric constant 29.7 stable below 83 °C piezoelectric coefficient 6pC/N	
homopiperazinium dimagnesium dioxalate sulfate dihydrate	C_{5}H_{14}N_{2}•Mg_{2}•[C_{2}O_{4}]_{2}•SO_{4}•2H_{2}O	monoclinic	Ia	a=11.5673 b=27.3352 c=16.6097 β=95.255° Z=12	5229.8	1.749	colourless	
piperazinium magnesium oxalate sulfate hydrate	C_{4}H_{12}N_{2}•Mg•[C_{2}O_{4}]•SO_{4}•H_{2}O	monoclinic	P2_{1}/c	a=12.7330 b=8.9240 c=11.8172 β=115.502° Z=4	1211.95	1.724	colourless	
potassium sulphato oxalate	?	triclinic		a = 6.37 b = 7.03 c = 10.61 α = 93.96 ̊ β = 101.37 ̊ γ = 100.1 ̊			colourless > 300 nm; SHG 1.6×KDP	
bapp = 1,4-bis(3-aminopropyl)piperazine	(H_{4}bapp)_{0.5}·VO(SO_{4})(C_{2}O_{4})	triclinic	P1̅	a=6.2031 b=8.6599 c=12.1853 α=77.130° β=76.207° γ=82.987°				
bipy=4,4′-bipyridine; (μ_{2}-Oxalato-O,O',O'',O''')-tetrakis(2,2'-bipyridine)-di-chromium(iii) disulfate 2,2'-bipyridine solvate monohydrate	[Cr_{2}(bipy)_{4}(C_{2}O_{4})](SO_{4})·(bipy)_{0.5}·H_{2}O	triclinic	P1̅	a=11.610 b=12.668 c=17.155 α=77.297° β=83.957° γ=85.458°				
depa = 3-(diethylamino)propylamine	H_{2}depa⋅Mn_{2}(SO_{4})(C_{2}O_{4})_{2}(H_{2}O)⋅H_{2}O	orthorhombic	Pbca	a=14.6293 b=15.6671 c=17.3579				
hpip = homopiperazine	H_{2}hpip·Mn_{2}(SO_{4})(C_{2}O_{4})_{2}(H_{2}O)	orthorhombic	P2_{1}2_{1}2_{1}	a=9.9066 b=12.4496 c=13.6640				
pip = piperazine; piperazinediium (μ-oxalato)-bis(μ-sulfato)-diaqua-di-manganese(ii) dihydrate	H_{2}pip·Mn_{2}(SO_{4})_{2}(C_{2}O_{4})(H_{2}O)_{4}	triclinic	P1̅	a 6.6501(4)Å b 7.7034(4)Å c 9.6810(5)Å, α 69.850(4)° β 70.553(5)° γ 83.921(4)°				
ipa = 3,3′-iminobis(N,N-dimethylpropylamine) bis(3-dimethylammoniopropyl)ammonium pentakis(μ-oxalato)-bis(μ-sulfato)-tetra-manganese(ii) dihydrate	H_{3}ipa⋅Mn_{2}(SO_{4})(C_{2}O_{4})_{2.5}·H_{2}O	triclinic	P1̅	a 9.9379(6)Å b 11.2423(6)Å c 11.6390(7)Å, α 86.793(5)° β 81.644(5)° γ 74.481(5)°				
dpta = dipropylenetriamine; bis(3-ammoniopropyl)ammonium tris(μ-oxalato)-bis(μ-sulfato)-bis(sulfato)-hexa-aqua-tetra-manganese(ii)	H_{3}dpta⋅Mn_{2}(SO_{4})_{2}(C_{2}O_{4})_{1.5}(H_{2}O)_{3}	triclinic	P1̅	a 8.6819(3)Å b 10.1689(3)Å c 13.7456(5)Å, α 70.197(3)° β 73.406(3)° γ 87.636(3)°				
dmen = N,N-dimethylethylenediamine	H_{2}dmen·Mn(SO_{4})(C_{2}O_{4})	monoclinic	P2_{1}/n	a=9.8603 b=12.6525 c=10.0837 β=113.002°				
bis(N,N-dimethylpropane-1,3-diaminium) bis(μ-oxalato)-bis(μ-sulfato)-di-manganese		triclinic	P1̅	a=8.5307 b=9.0432 c=9.6913 α=69.632° β=64.639° γ=88.148°				
butane-1,4-diaminium bis(μ-oxalato)-(μ-sulfato)-aqua-di-manganese		triclinic	P1̅	a=8.5468 b=10.0050 c=10.6532 α=75.445° β=79.787° γ=71.848°				
	Na_{2}Fe(C_{2}O_{4})SO_{4}⋅H_{2}O						orange; most air sensitive	
(μ-oxalato)-(μ-sulfato)-iron-di-potassium	K_{2}[Fe(C_{2}O_{4})(SO_{4})]	monoclinic	P2_{1}/c	a=5.8735 b=10.2169 c=13.1491 β=91.226°				
tris(μ-oxalato)-bis(μ-sulfato)-tri-iron-tetra-potassium	K_{4}[Fe_{3}(C_{2}O_{4})_{3}(SO_{4})_{2}]	monoclinic	P2_{1}/c	a 13.739 b 5.496 c 12.774 β 97.677°				
acid oxalo-bisulfate of roseocobalt ??	Co_{2}(HN_{3})_{10}(C_{2}O_{4})(SO_{4})_{2} ·H_{2}O·H_{2}C_{2}O_{4}						speculative	
	[Co(NH_{3})_{4}(C_{2}O_{4})]_{2}SO_{4}·2H_{2}O							
	[Co(NH_{3})_{4}(C_{2}O_{4})]_{2}S_{2}O6							
tris(μ-aqua)-tris(μ-oxalato)-tris(μ-sulfato)-tri-cobalt-hexa-sodium	Na_{2}[Co(C_{2}O_{4})(SO_{4})]·H_{2}O	hexagonal	P6̅_{2}m	a=10.2322 c=6.4774				
tris(μ-oxalato)-bis(μ-sulfato)-bis(2-((2-aminoethyl)amino)ethanaminium)-tetraaqua-tetra-cobalt		triclinic	P1̅	a=8.6065 b=9.5595 c=9.5987 α=77.884° β=82.744° γ=87.356°				
bis(μ-oxalato)-bis(μ-sulfato)-bis(4-(2-aminoethyl)piperazin-1-ium)-tri-cobalt		triclinic	P1̅	a=8.4331 b=9.4691 c=9.5144 α=71.522° β=64.356° γ=89.622°				
1,4-dimethylpiperazinedi-ium bis(μ-oxalato)-hepta-aqua-tri-cobalt bis(sulfate)	(H_{2}dmp)(SO_{4})_{3}Co_{3}(C_{2}O_{4})_{2}(H_{2}O)_{7}	orthorhombic	Pnma	a=11.1050 b=16.4221 c=13.9815			violet	
Bis[tris(oxamide dioxime-^{2}N,N')cobalt(III)] oxalate bis(sulfate) dodecahydrate	[Co(C_{2}H_{6}N_{4}O_{2})_{3}]_{2}(C_{2}O_{4})(SO_{4})_{2}12H_{2}O	triclinic	P1̅	a = 9.430 b = 11.782 c = 12.812 α = 65.494° β = 83.088° γ = 86.735° Z=1	1285.7	1.698	at 193K; red	
homopiperazinium dizinc dioxalate sulfate hydrate	C_{5}H_{14}N_{2}•Zn_{2}•[C_{2}O_{4}]_{2}•SO_{4}•H_{2}O	monoclinic	P2_{1}	a=15.8356 b=13.5022 c=15.9578 β=109.075° Z=8	3224.7	2.154	colourless	
homopiperazinium dizinc dioxalate sulfate dihydrate	C_{5}H_{14}N_{2}•Zn_{2}•[C_{2}O_{4}]_{2}•SO_{4}•2H_{2}O	monoclinic	Ia	a=11.5681 b=27.1755 c=16.5979 β=94.946° Z=12	5198.4	2.074	colourless	
bis(4-(2-aminoethyl)piperazin-1-ium)-bis(μ-oxalato)-bis(μ-sulfato)-tri-zinc		triclinic	P1̅	a=8.407 b=9.523 c=9.543 α=108.39° β=115.52° γ=90.17°				
1,4-dimethylpiperazinedi-ium bis(sulfate) bis(μ-oxalato)-hepta-aqua-tri-zinc	(H_{2}dmp)(SO_{4})_{3}Zn_{3}(C_{2}O_{4})_{2}(H_{2}O)_{7}	orthorhombic	Pnma	a 11.1058 b 16.3449 c 14.0064			colourless	
	(Hgly)_{2}·Zn(SO_{4})(C_{2}O_{4})	monoclinic	C2	a 19.1509 b 5.4000 c 12.8206 β 102.878°				
	RbFe(SO_{4})(C_{2}O_{4})_{0.5}·H_{2}O	monoclinic	P2_{1}/c	a = 7.9193, b = 9.4907, c = 8.8090, β = 95.180°, Z = 4				
bis(μ_{3}-sulfato)-bis(μ_{2}-oxalato)-diaqua-di-yttrium diammonium	[NH_{4}][Y(H_{2}O)(SO_{4})(C_{2}O_{4})]	monoclinic	P2_{1}/n	a=6.534 b=8.527 c=13.745 β=92.87°				
bis(μ_{3}-Sulfato-O,O,O',O'',O''')-(μ_{2}-oxalato-O,O',O'',O''')-(μ_{2}-piperazine-diium-1,4-diacetato-O,O')-diaqua-di-yttrium(iii)	Y_{2}(H_{2}pda)(C_{2}O_{4})(SO_{4})_{2}(H_{2}O)_{2}]	monoclinic	C2/c	a 19.392 b 6.2757 c 16.999 β 108.279°				
levinsonite-(Y)	(Y,Nd,Ce)Al(SO_{4})_{2}(C_{2}O_{4}) · 12H_{2}O	monoclinic	P2/n	a = 10.289 Å, b = 9.234, c = 11.015 β = 108.50°	992.4	2.181	Biaxial (+) Refractive index: n_{α} = 1.480 n_{β} = 1.490 n_{γ} = 1.550	
thfa = tetrahydrofurfurylamine; bis(tetrahydrofurfurylammonium) tris(μ-oxalato)-(μ-sulfato)-di-indium(iii) dihydrate	(Hthfa)_{2}·In_{2}(SO_{4})(C_{2}O_{4})_{3}·2H_{2}O	monoclinic	P2_{1}/c	a=10.7581 b=12.9985 c=19.9093 β=92.876°				
bapp = N,N′-bis(3-aminopropyl)piperazine	H_{4}bapp·[In_{2}(SO_{4})_{3}(C_{2}O_{4})_{2}(H_{2}O)_{2}]·H_{2}O	monoclinic	I2/a	a=13.8931 b=14.6792 c=15.2418 β=111.153°				
bis(1-ethylpiperazinedi-ium) tris(μ-oxalato)-bis(sulfato)-di-indium	H_{2}epip·[In_{2}(SO_{4})_{2}(C_{2}O_{4})_{3}]	tetragonal	I4_{1}/a	a=26.0767 c=8.9467			colourless	
Piperazinediium bis(μ_{2}-oxalato-O,O',O'',O''')-bis(μ_{2}-sulfato-O,O')-diaqua-di-indium dihydrate	[C_{4}N_{2}H_{12}]_{0.5}InSO_{4}C_{2}O_{4}·2H_{2}O	monoclinic	P2_{1}/c	a=6.478 b=11.067 c=14.317 β=100.302°				
	Hgly·In(SO_{4})(C_{2}O_{4})(gly)	monoclinic	P2_{1}	a 6.5179(2)Å b 10.9928(3)Å c 18.0301(6)Å, α 90° β 93.9700(10)°				
	CsMn(SO_{4})(C_{2}O_{4})_{0.5}·H_{2}O	monoclinic	P2_{1}/c	a = 8.065, b = 9.610, c = 9.219, β = 94.564°, Z = 4				
	CsFe(SO_{4})(C_{2}O_{4})_{0.5}·H_{2}O	monoclinic	P2_{1}/c	a = 7.9377, b = 9.5757, c = 9.1474, β = 96.104°, Z = 4				
	La_{2}(C_{2}O_{4})(SO_{4})_{2}(H_{2}O)_{3}	monoclinic	P2_{1}/n	a=9.838 b=9.817 c=13.111 β=104.258°				
bis(μ_{3}-sulfato)-bis(μ_{2}-oxalato)-diaqua-di-lanthanum diammonium	[NH_{4}][La(H_{2}O)(SO_{4})(C_{2}O_{4})]	monoclinic	P2_{1}/n	a=6.629 b=8.673 c=13.867 β=93.35°				
(μ_{4}-Piperazine-diium-1,4-diacetato-O,O',O'',O''')-bis(μ_{3}-sulfato-O,O',O'')-(μ_{2}-oxalato-O,O',O'',O''')-diaqua-di-cerium(iii) dihydrate	Ce_{2}(H_{2}pda)(C_{2}O_{4})(SO_{4})_{2}(H_{2}O)_{2} · 2H_{2}O	monoclinic	C2/c	a 19.353 b 6.836 c 16.400 β 94.312°				
coskrenite-(Ce)	(Ce,Nd,La)_{2}(C_{2}O_{4})(SO_{4})_{2} · 12H_{2}O	triclinic		a = 6.007(1) Å, b = 8.368(2) Å, c = 9.189(2) Å α = 99.90(2)°, β = 105.55(2)°, γ = 107.71(2)°		2.881	Biaxial (-) refractive indices: n_{α} = 1.544 n_{β} = 1.578 n_{γ} = 1.602; Birefringence: δ = 0.058	
zugshunstite-(Ce)	(Ce,Nd,La)Al(SO_{4})_{2}(C_{2}O_{4}) · 12H_{2}O	Monoclinic	C2/c	a = 8.718 b = 18.313 c = 13.128 β = 93.90°	2091	2.121	Large REE; pink in incandescent light; blue in fluorescent light; Biaxial (+) refractive index: n_{α} = 1.455 n_{β} = 1.485 n_{γ} = 1.528;	
(μ_{4}-Piperazine-diium-1,4-diacetato-O,O',O'',O''')-bis(μ_{3}-sulfato-O,O',O'')-(μ_{2}-oxalato-O,O',O'',O''')-diaqua-di-praseodymium(iii) dihydrate	Pr_{2}(H_{2}pda)(C_{2}O_{4})(SO_{4})_{2}(H_{2}O)_{2} · 2H_{2}O	monoclinic	C2/c	a 19.295 b 6.8100 c 16.377 β 94.369°				
heptakis(μ-oxalato)-bis(μ-sulfato)-tetradecaaqua-hexa-neodymium dihydrate	Nd_{6}(SO_{4})_{2}(C_{2}O_{4})_{7}(H_{2}O)_{14}·H_{2}O	triclinic	P1̅	a=6.0817 b=11.8807 c=16.0749 α=73.230° β=80.873° γ=88.976°				
N,N'-dimethylethane-1,2-diaminium tetrakis(μ-sulfato)-tris(μ-oxalato)-octaaqua-tetra-neodymium	[C_{4}H_{14}N_{2}]·Nd_{4}(SO_{4})_{4}(C_{2}O_{4})_{3}(H_{2}O)_{8}	triclinic	P1̅	a=7.0649 b=11.2771 c=11.8318 α=67.370° β=80.035° γ=82.821°				
bis(μ_{3}-Sulfato-O,O,O',O'',O''')-(μ_{2}-oxalato-O,O',O'',O''')-(μ_{2}-piperazine-diium-1,4-diacetato-O,O')-diaqua-di-neodymium(iii)	Nd_{2}(H_{2}pda)(C_{2}O_{4})(SO_{4})_{2}(H_{2}O)_{2}]	monoclinic	C2/c	a=19.702 b=6.348 c=17.352 β=109.973°				
bis(1,4-Diazoniabicyclo[2.2.2]octane) tetrakis(μ_{2}-oxalato-O,O',O'',O''')-tetrakis(μ_{2}-sulfato-O,O',O'')-octa-aqua-tetra-neodymium(iii) dihydrate	[C_{6}N_{2}H_{14}][Nd_{2}(C_{2}O_{4})_{2}(SO_{4})_{2}(H_{2}O)_{4}]·H_{2}O	monoclinic	P2_{1}/c	a=8.523 b=28.628 c=9.306 β=96.497°				
(μ_{4}-Piperazine-diium-1,4-diacetato-O,O',O'',O''')-bis(μ_{3}-sulfato-O,O',O'')-(μ_{2}-oxalato-O,O',O'',O''')-diaqua-di-europium(iii) dihydrate	Eu_{2}(H_{2}pda)(C_{2}O_{4})(SO_{4})_{2}(H_{2}O)_{2} · 2H_{2}O	monoclinic	C2/c	a=19.143 b=6.722 c=16.323 β=94.58°				
(μ_{5}-Oxalato)-(μ_{3}-sulfato)-(μ_{2}-aqua)-aqua-europium-silver	AgEu(μ_{5}-C_{2}O_{4})(SO_{4})(H_{2}O)_{2}	monoclinic	P2_{1}/c	a=6.627 b=13.848 c=8.983 β=96.985°				
tetrakis(μ_{2}-oxalato)-bis(μ_{2}-sulfato)-dodeca-aqua-tetra-erbium monohydrate	Er_{4}(SO_{4})_{2}(C_{2}O_{4})_{4}(H_{2}O)_{12}·H_{2}O	monoclinic	P2_{1}/c	a=10.5598 b=12.8404 c=12.0835 β=93.327°				
bis(μ_{3}-sulfato)-bis(μ_{2}-oxalato)-diaqua-di-samarium diammonium	[NH_{4}][Sm(H_{2}O)(SO_{4})(C_{2}O_{4})]	monoclinic	P2_{1}/n	a=6.619 b=8.660 c=13.853 β=93.30°				
(μ_{5}-Oxalato)-(μ_{3}-sulfato)-(μ_{2}-aqua)-aqua-samarium-silver	AgSm(μ_{5}-C_{2}O_{4})(SO_{4})(H_{2}O)_{2}	monoclinic	P2_{1}/c	a=6.630 b=13.829 c=9.001 β=97.128°				
	(NH_{4})[Gd(C_{2}O_{4})(SO_{4})(H_{2}O)]						large magnetocaloric effect	
	K[Gd(C_{2}O_{4})(SO_{4})(H_{2}O)]	monoclinic	P2_{1}/c	a = 6.5849 b = 8.5660 c = 14.7660(2) Å, β = 112.470° Z=4	769.66	3.439	colourless	
potassium aquaterbium(III) oxalate sulfate	KTb(C_{2}O_{4})(SO_{4})(H_{2}O)	monoclinic		a = 6.527 b = 8.507 c = 14.591 β = 112.65° Z=4	747.7		at 113K; colourless	
(μ_{6}-Oxalato)-(μ_{4}-oxalato)-bis(μ_{3}-sulfato)-diaqua-di-silver-di-terbium	AgTb(μ_{4}-C_{2}O_{4})_{0.5}(μ_{6}-C_{2}O_{4})_{0.5}(SO_{4})(H_{2}O)	monoclinic	C2/m	a=13.693 b=6.889 c=9.0885 β=116.73°				
(μ_{6}-Oxalato)-(μ_{4}-oxalato)-bis(μ_{3}-sulfato)-diaqua-di-dysprosium-di-silver	AgDy(μ_{4}-C_{2}O_{4})_{0.5}(μ_{6}-C_{2}O_{4})_{0.5}(SO_{4})(H_{2}O)	monoclinic	C2/m	a=13.683 b=6.881 c=9.080 β=116.731°				
bis(1-ethyl-3-methyl-1H-imidazol-3-ium) (μ-oxalato)-bis(μ-sulfato)-tetraoxo-di-uranium monohydrate		monoclinic	P2_{1}/c	a=11.579 b=17.312 c=13.694 β=108.178°			yellow	
	(NH_{4})_{4}[(UO_{2})_{2}(C_{2}O_{4})(SO_{4})_{2}(NCS)_{2}]⋅6H_{2}O	orthorhombic	Pbam	a = 12.0177 b = 18.6182 c = 6.757 Z=2				
Tetrapotassium bis(μ_{2}-oxalato)-tetraoxo-bis(sulfato)-di-uranium(vi) hexahydrate	K_{2}[UO_{2}(C_{2}O_{4})SO_{4}] · 3H_{2}O	triclinic	P1̅	a=5.743 b=9.544 c=11.845 α=89.49° β=84.95° γ=83.01°				
	K_{4}[(UO_{2})_{2}C_{2}O_{4}(SO_{4})_{2}(NCS)_{2}]	orthorhombic	Pbam	a = 11.5548 b = 7.0847 c = 13.5172 β = 93.130° Z=2	1104.90			
Di-rubidium dioxo-(oxalato-O,O')-(μ_{3}-sulfato)-uranium monohydrate	Rb_{2}[UO_{2}SO_{4}(C_{2}O_{4})] · H_{2}O	orthorhombic	Pna2_{1}	a=9.720 b=17.037 c=6.852				
	Rb_{4}[(UO_{2})_{2}C_{2}O_{4}(SO_{4})_{2}(NCS)_{2}]	orthorhombic	Pbam	a = 11.5854 b = 7.3841 c = 13.9072 β = 95.754 V = Z=2	1183.7			
	Cs_{4}[(UO_{2})_{2}(C_{2}O_{4})(SO_{4})_{2}(NCS)_{2}] · 4H_{2}O	orthorhombic	Pbam	a = 11.6539 b = 18.379 c = 6.7216 Z=2				
Tetracesium dioxo-bis(oxalato-O,O')-(sulfato-O)-uranium(vi) hydrate	Cs_{4}[UO_{2}(C_{2}O_{4})_{2}SO_{4}] · 2.7H_{2}O	orthorhombic	Pbca	a=9.546 b=21.119 c=21.499				
