= Zhemchuzhnikov =

Zhemchuzhnikov (Russian: Жемчужников, from жемчуг meaning pearl) is a Russian masculine surname, its feminine counterpart is Zhemchuzhnikova. It may refer to

- Aleksey Zhemchuzhnikov (1821–1908), Russian poet, dramatist, essayist
- Yuri Zhemchuzhnikov (1885–1957), Russian geologist
