= Uroxite =

General
- Category: Oxalate mineral
- Formula: [(UO_{2})_{2}(C_{2}O_{4})(OH)_{2}(H_{2}O)_{2}]·H_{2}O
- IMA symbol: Urx
- Crystal system: Monoclinic

Identification
- Colour: light yellow
- Crystal habit: An
- Cleavage: {101},{010}
- Mohs scale hardness: 2
- Density: 4.187 g/cm^{3}

Uroxite is an oxalate mineral first discovered as part of the Carbon Mineral Challenge. It is the first discovered uranium-containing organic mineral.
