= Idrialin =

Idrialin is a mineral wax which can be distilled from the mineral idrialite. According to G. Goldschmidt of the Chemical Society of London, it can be extracted by means of xylene, amyl alcohol or turpentine; also without decomposition, by distillation in a current of hydrogen, or carbon dioxide. It is a white crystalline body, very difficultly fusible, boiling above 440 °C (824 °F). Its solution in glacial acetic acid, by oxidation with chromic acid, yielded a red powdery solid and a fatty acid fusing at 62 °C, and exhibiting all the characters of a mixture of palmitic acid and stearic acid.
