= Joan Abella i Creus =

Catalan mineralogist

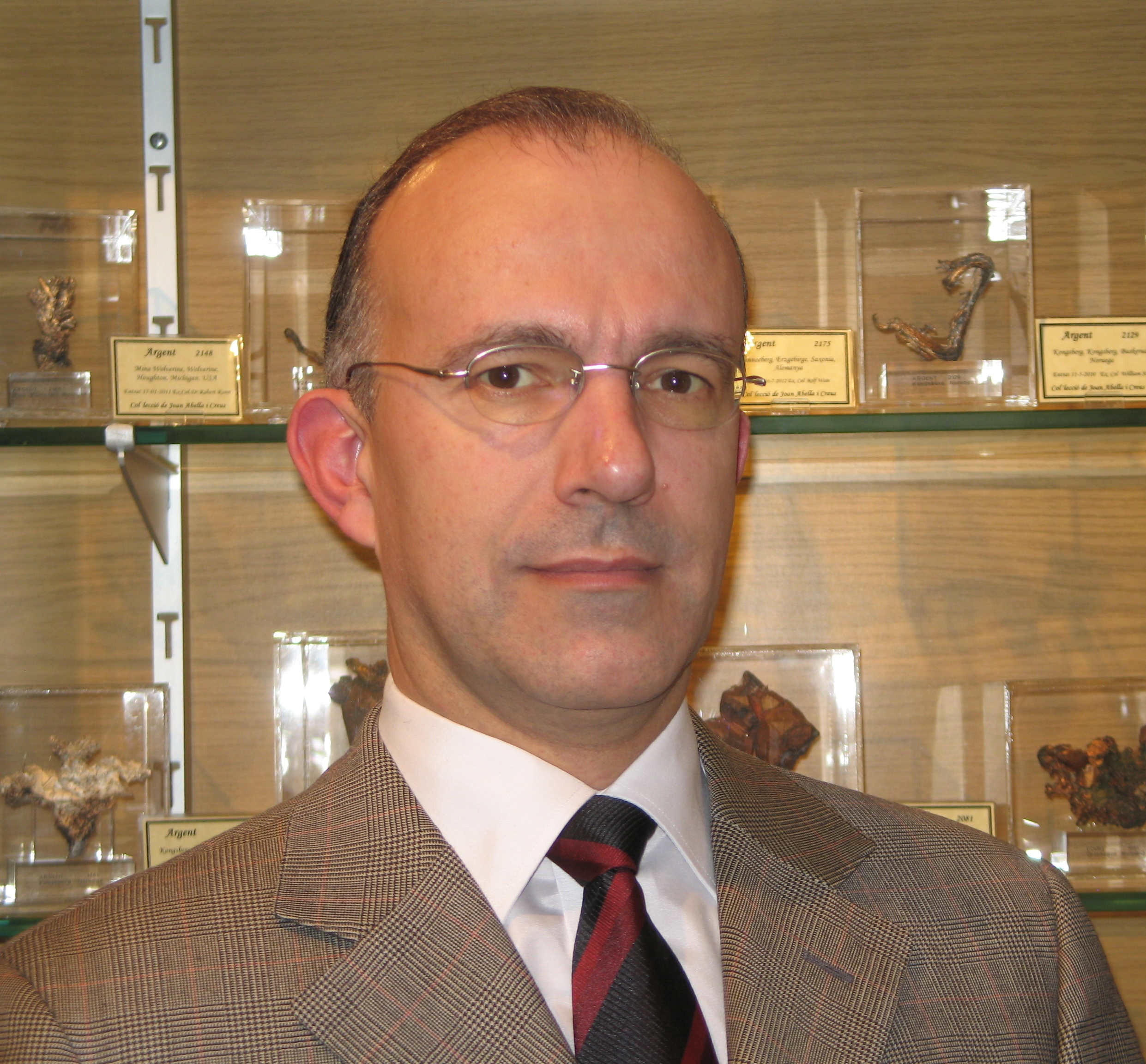
Joan Abella

Joan Abella i Creus (Sabadell, Barcelona, 1968) is a Catalan gemologist and mineralogist who discovered abellaite, a mineral that receives this name in his honor.

== Articles and publications ==
In 2008, he published his first book, "Minerals i Mines de la conca minera de Bellmunt del Priorat", a unique work in the Catalan town of Bellmunt del Priorat, never before described. It consists of three parts: the first is a well-illustrated discussion of the history of mining in the area from the proto-Iberian era to the present. The second part describes most of the important mines, as well as the methods of profit used. The third part is a description of the minerals that have been found there, accompanied by 100 photos of mineral samples from their own collection.

He has also collaborated in the publication of several books, such as "Atlas de Asociaciones Minerales en láminas Prima" by Professor Joan Carles Melgarejo, "Minerales de España" by Joaquín Mollfulleda, "Minerales y Minas de España" by Miguel Calvo, and "Els Minerals de Catalunya" by Eugeni Bareche. He also collaborated on the work "Minerales y Piedras Preciosas", published in Madrid in 1994.

He has written several articles for various magazines specialized in mineralogy, such as the magazine "Mineralogists de Catalunya", published by the "Grup Mineralògic Català", or "Bocamina", published by the Mineralógico Group of Madrid. Does the article "Anthropogenic Silver?" who wrote about the silver of the Balcoll mine in Falset (Tarragona), a mine exploited since the fourteenth century by the Counts of the Mountains of Prades and lords of the Barony of Entenza, which describes as specimens of acantite can be used to create samples of silver wire made by man, it was translated immediately into several other languages. The silver crystals of this place are the best specimens obtained in Spain due to their aesthetic crystallization.

== Discoveries ==
One of the most significant contributions of Abella has been to increase the knowledge of the mineral heritage of the country, for having found, analyzed and published information on a variety of mineral species that had not previously been found in the territory. Some of these minerals are the xanthoconite of the Balcoll mine (Falset), the hopeite of La Cresta mine (Bellmunt del Priorat), the natronambulite of Joaquima mine (also in Bellmunt del Priorat), and arsenuranilite and čejkaite from the Eureka mine (Torre de Cabdella, Lleida). The discovery of this last species in the Torre de Cabdella was the second event in the world. The finding of the breithauptite in the Balcoll mine also stands out, the best crystallized specimens of this species never to date anywhere in the world.

In 2015, the International Mineralogical Association approved as a new species, the abellaite, named in this way in his honor. It was discovered at the Eureka mine, at Castell-estaó (La Torre de Cabdella, Lleida). This discovery was the first type locality in Catalonia, being the first mineral discovered in the territory. The type material, characterized by researchers from the Jaume Almera Earth Sciences Institute (CSIC) and the University of Barcelona, is deposited in the collections of the Museum of Natural Sciences of Barcelona, with the number of shows "MGB 26,350".
