= Middlebackite =

Copper oxalate mineral

General
- Category: Organic mineral
- Formula: Cu_{2}C_{2}O_{4}(OH)_{2}
- IMA symbol: Mbk
- Crystal system: Monoclinic
- Crystal class: 2/m - Prismatic

Identification
- Color: Turquoise

Middlebackite is an organic mineral with the formula Cu_{2}C_{2}O_{4}(OH)_{2}. It was first discovered within a boulder from the Iron Monarch quarry in South Australia in June 1990. Peter Elliott from the University of Adelaide, Australia, identified the structure of the mineral 25 years later. He determined its crystal structure through single-crystal X-ray diffraction using synchrotron radiation. Elliot named the mineral for the Middleback Range where it originated. In 2018 middlebackite was found in Val di Fiemme, Italy, during researches that brought to the discovery of a new mineral named fiemmeite.

== Localities ==
- Australia: Iron Monarch open cut, Iron Knob, Middleback Range, Eyre Peninsula, South Australia
- Italy: Passo di san Lugano, near Carano
