= Carpathite =

Very rare organic mineral

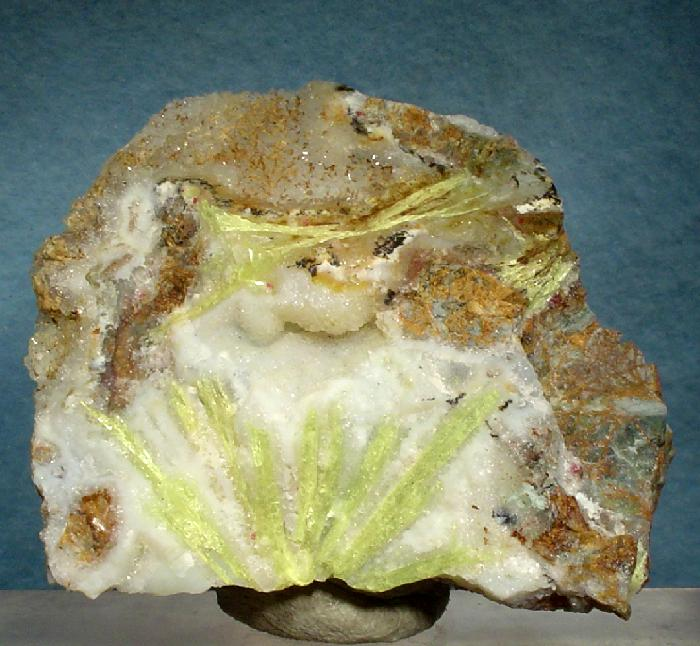
- Carpathite from New Idria District, California USA

General
- Category: Organic mineral
- Formula: C_{24}H_{12}
- IMA symbol: Cpa
- Strunz classification: 10.BA.30
- Crystal system: Monoclinic
- Crystal class: Prismatic (2/m) (same H-M symbol)
- Space group: P2_{1}/c, P2_{1}/n
- Unit cell: a = 1625 pm, b = 463.8 pm, c = 1042 pm; β = 111°10'; Z = 2

Identification
- Color: Yellow, yellowish brown on exposure
- Crystal habit: Acicular to thin tabular in bladed groups and fibrous radiating aggregates
- Cleavage: Perfect on [001], [100] and [2̅01]
- Fracture: Splintery
- Tenacity: Flexible, nearly plastic
- Mohs scale hardness: 1.5
- Luster: Vitreous - adamantine
- Streak: Yellow white
- Diaphaneity: Transparent
- Specific gravity: 1.35
- Optical properties: Biaxial (+/-)
- Refractive index: n_{α} = 1.760 - 1.780 n_{β} = 1.977 - 1.982 n_{γ} = 2.050 - 2.150
- Birefringence: δ = 0.290 - 0.370
- Melting point: 432.8 °C
- Other characteristics: Fluorescent - electric blue to blue-green

Carpathite is a very rare hydrocarbon mineral, consisting of exceptionally pure coronene (C_{24}H_{12}), a polycyclic aromatic hydrocarbon. The name has been spelled karpatite and the mineral was improperly renamed pendletonite.

== Discovery ==
The mineral was first described in 1955 for an occurrence in Transcarpathian Oblast, Ukraine. It was named for the Carpathian Mountains.

In 1967, unaware of the earlier description, Joseph Murdoch analyzed and described a specimen from the Picacho Peak area of San Benito County, California and named it "pendletonite".

== Structure ==
Carpathite has the same crystal structure of pure coronene. The molecules are planar and lie in two sets with roughly perpendicular orientations. Molecules in the same set are parallel and partially offset, with planes 0.3463 nm apart. That is slightly larger than the inter-layer distance of graphite layers (0.335 nm), and much larger than the C-C bond lengths within the molecule (about 0.14 nm). This "corrugated layer" structure is highly resistant to intercalation, which apparently explains the purity of the mineral.

== Occurrence ==
In the Ukraine discovery location, carpathite occurs at the contact zone of a diorite intrusive into argillite within cavities, and is associated with idrialite, amorphous organic material, calcite, barite, quartz, cinnabar, and metacinnabar. It has also been reported in the Presov Region of the Slovak Republic and in the Kamchatka Oblast in Russia.

In the California location, it occurs in centimeter-size veins, associated (and somewhat contemporaneous) with quartz and cinnabar, in a silicified matrix. Crystals are up to 10 × 1 × 1 mm. Carbon isotope ratios and the morphology of the deposit indicate that the coronene was produced from organic matter in oceanic sediment, thermally decomposed, purified through hydrothermal transportation and chemical reactions, and deposition below 250 °C, after the other minerals in the intrusion.
