= Hoelite =

Mineral

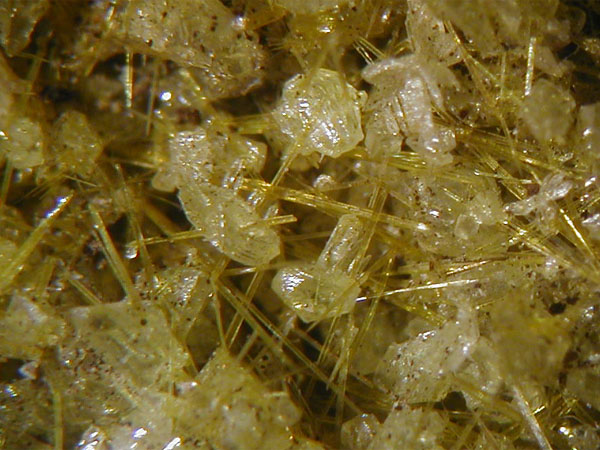
- Yellow acicular crystals of hoelite (picture size: 10 mm)

General
- Category: Organic mineral
- Formula: C_{14}H_{8}O_{2}
- IMA symbol: Hoe
- Strunz classification: 10.CA.15
- Dana classification: 50.4.2.1
- Crystal system: Monoclinic
- Crystal class: Prismatic (2/m) (same H-M symbol)
- Space group: P2_{1}/a
- Unit cell: a = 15.81 Å, b = 3.967 Å c = 7.876 Å; β = 102.67°; Z = 2

Identification
- Color: Yellow, yellowish green
- Crystal habit: Acicular clusters; pseudo-orthorhombic
- Cleavage: Good
- Streak: Light yellow
- Diaphaneity: Semitransparent
- Specific gravity: 1.42
- Optical properties: Biaxial (+)
- Refractive index: n_{α}≈1.75, n_{β}≈1.75, n_{γ}≈2.0

Hoelite is a mineral, discovered in 1922 at Mt. Pyramide, Spitsbergen, Norway and named after Norwegian geologist Adolf Hoel (1879–1964). Its chemical formula is C_{14}H_{8}O_{2} (9,10-anthraquinone).

It is a very rare organic mineral which occurs in coal fire environments in association with sal ammoniac and native sulfur.
