= Meyrowitzite =

Carbonate mineral

General
- Category: Carbonate minerals
- Formula: Ca(UO_{2})(CO_{3})_{2}·5H_{2}O
- IMA symbol: Mey
- Strunz classification: 5.EB
- Crystal system: Monoclinic
- Space group: P2_{1}/n
- Unit cell: a = 12.376(3) Å b = 16.0867(14) Å c = 20.1340(17) Å β = 107.679(13)°

Identification
- Color: Transparent yellow
- Twinning: None
- Cleavage: 1 perfect cleave [-101]
- Fracture: Irregular
- Tenacity: Brittle
- Mohs scale hardness: 2
- Luster: Vitreous
- Streak: Pale yellow
- Density: 2.70(2) g*cm^{3}
- Optical properties: Biaxial (+)
- Pleochroism: Pale yellow
- Ultraviolet fluorescence: Week greenish yellow to moderate greenish blue
- Solubility: Easily soluble in room temperature H_{2}O
- Other characteristics: Radioactive

Meyrowitzite, Ca(UO_{2})(CO_{3})_{2}·5H_{2}O, is a carbonate mineral verified in May 2018 by the Commission of New Minerals, Nomenclature and Classification of the International Mineralogical Association. It is an extremely rare mineral, discovered in the Markey mine Utah, U.S.A. The mineral is a transparent yellow and has blades up to approximately 0.2 mm in length. It is soluble in water or aqueous solutions. Meyrowitzite is named in honor of Robert Meyrowitz (1916–2013), an American analytical chemist. After serving in WW II, he joined the United States Geological Survey (USGS). He was known for developing innovative new methods for analyzing small and difficult to study mineralogical samples along with his formulation of the high-index immersion liquids.

== Occurrence ==
Meyrowitzite was discovered underground in the Markey mine, Red Canyon, Suan Juan County, Utah, U.S.A. It has not been found in any other location. Mineralized channels of meyrowitzite are in the Shinarump Member of the Chinle Formation. The Shinarump member is made up of medium-to coarse-grained sandstone, conglomeratic sandstone beds, and thick siltstone lenses. Ore minerals were deposited as replacements of wood and other organic materials and as disseminations in the enclosing sandstone. Since the closing of the Markey mine, oxidation of primary ores in the humid underground environment has produced a variety of secondary minerals. These secondary minerals are primarily sulfates as efflorescent crusts on the surfaces of mine walls. It is found on calcite-veined asphaltum in association with gypsum, markeyite, and rozenite.

== Properties ==
Meyrowitzite has bladed crystals with a length up to about 0.2 mm. The blades are commonly irregular and radiating outward from a central point. Blades are elongate on [010], flattened on {100} and exhibit the forms {100}, {001}, {101}, {110}, and {011}. There was no twinning observed. It is a transparent yellow with vitreous luster and a very pale yellow streak. It displays variable fluorescence from weak greenish-yellow to moderate greenish blue under a 405 nm laser. It has a hardness of 2 based on Mohs hardness scale. It has brittle tenacity, irregular fracture, and one perfect cleavage on {-101}. The density was measured at 2.70(2) g*cm^-3 by flotation in a methylene iodide and toluene mixture. It is easily soluble in room temperature water. It is optically biaxial (+) with α = 1.520(2), β = 1.528(2), and γ = 1.561(2) measured in white light. The 2V measured using extinction data analyzed with EXCALIBRW is 53.0(6)°; the calculated 2V is 53.3°. The dispersion is weak, r > v. The optical orientation is Z = b, Y ^ a ≈ 19° in obtuse β. Crystals are weakly pleochroic in shades of pale yellow, X ≈ Y < Z. The Gladstone–Dale compatibility, 1 – (KP/KC) is –0.039 (excellent) using the empirical formula, and –0.035 (excellent) using the ideal formula, where k(UO_{3}) = 0.134.

=== Raman spectroscopy ===
Raman spectroscopy is a method of chemical analysis that is non-destructive. The analysis provides detailed information about chemical structure, phase, polymorphy, crystallinity, and molecular interactions. Meyrowitzite's Raman spectroscopy was conducted on a Horiba XploRA PLUS. The spectrum was recorded using a 785 nm diode laser because of significant fluorescence when using a 532 nm diode laser. Meryrowitzites spectrum is similar to that of Zellerites. However, Meyrowitzite's spectrum has a larger number of bands primarily in the UO^{2+}_{2}. This is most likely due to the site-symmetry which for Meyrowitzite is monoclinic and orthorhombic for Zellerite.

=== Chemical analysis ===
Chemical Analysis of Meyrowitzite was performed on a Cameca SX-50 electron microprobe with four wavelength-dispersive spectrometers and using Probe for EPMA software at the University of Utah. The acceleration voltage was 15 keV, with a 10 nA beam current, and a beam diameter of 5μm. The raw X-ray intensities were corrected with a φρ(z) algorithm for the matrix effect. The concentration of the total oxygen and carbon, calculated from the ideal formula, were used in the matrix correction. Because of crystal dehydration, the surfaces suffered and it was impossible to obtain a well-polished crystal surface. The sample was not damaged because of the beam. The H_{2}O and (CO_{2}) amounts were calculated based on the structure determination (2 C and 13 O apfu) due to insufficient material instead of the more common method of direct determination. The empirical formula is Ca_{0.94}(U_{1.00O2})(CO_{3})2·5(H_{2.02O}). The ideal formula is Ca(UO_{2})(CO_{3})_{2}·5H_{2}O, which requires CaO 10.78, UO_{3} 54.98, CO_{2} 16.92, and H_{2}O 17.32, totaling 100 wt%.

=== X-Ray crystallography and structure determination ===
Powder and single-crystal X-ray studies were performed using a Rigaku R-Axis Rapid II curved imaging plate microdiffractometer with monochromatized MoKα radiation. A Gandolfi-like motion was used during the powder study on the φ and ω axes. This was done to randomize the sample which was several crystals thick. Using the JADE 2010 software, d values and intensities were derived by profile fitting. Unit-cell parameters from the powder data using JADE 2010 are a = 12.417(17) Å, b = 16.127(17) Å, c = 20.123(17) Å, β = 107.53(4)°, and V = 3842(7) Å3. Meyrowitzite crystals are relatively poor-quality for single-crystal study. The crystal fragment, measuring 80 × 80 × 30 μm, exhibited substantial mosaicity, some spot streaking, and some extra spots indicative of one or more satellite crystals. This crystal provided usable data to a resolution of .88Å. Structural data were determined with Rigaku CrystalCleal software. This included Lorentz and polarization corrections, and the application of an empirical absorption correction using the multi-scan method with ABSCOR. Rigaku XPlain program determined the space group P21/n, which led to a structural solution using SIR2011. Because of the imperfect crystal fragment, numerous reflections violated the extinction conditions for space group P21/n (n glide) and the commission of five poorly fitting reflections that did not violate the extinction conditions. SHELXL-2013 was used for the refining of the structure. The limited data set allowed refinement with anisotropic displacement parameters for all fully occupied sites, but not for four approximately half-occupied H_{2}O sites (OW14, OW15, OW16, and OW17). It also did not allow the location of H sites in difference Fourier maps.

d-spacing	Intensity
12.11 Å	(100)
9.52 Å	(48)
8.19 Å	(59)
5.96 Å	(68)
5.04 Å	(79)
4.359 Å	(45)
4.057 Å	(32)
3.944 Å	(31)

== Structure ==
Meyrowitzite has a crystal structure based on a unique corrugated uranyl carbonate heteropolyhedral sheet. Meyrowitzite is dimorphous with Zellerite but Zellerites structure is not known. The PXRD patterns for Meyrowitzite and Zellerite are quite different. Although the strongest peaks in the Zellerite pattern are represented in the Meyrowitzite pattern, the four strongest lines in the Meyrowitzite pattern are not in the Zellerite pattern.

There are three U sites in Meyrowitzite's structure. Two (U1 and U2) are surrounded by eight O atoms. This forms a squat UO_{8} hexagonal bipyramid. (U3) is surrounded by seven O atoms forming a squat UO_{7} pentagonal bipyramid. The two short apical bonds of all three bipyramids constitute the UO_{2} 2+ uranyl group. Of the six CO_{3} 2– groups in the structure, three centered by C1, C2, and C3 share alternating equatorial edges of the U1 hexagonal bipyramid, thereby forming the well-known uranyl tricarbonate (UTC) unit. The other three, centered by C4, C5, and C6, share alternating equatorial edges of the U2 hexagonal bipyramid, forming a second UTC unit. The five equatorial corners of the U3 pentagonal bipyramid are shared with O atoms of the C1, C2, C3, C4, and C6 carbonate groups. These linkages create a unique corrugated uranyl carbonate heteropolyhedral sheet parallel to {101}. The U2 UTCs are oriented perpendicular to the plane of the sheet with the unshared corner of the C5 carbonate group pointing away from the sheet. Three Ca atoms (Ca1, Ca2, and Ca3) are eightfold-coordinated to O atoms in the sheets and to OW atoms, although Ca3 is effectively only sevenfold-coordinated because two of its ligands (OW15 and OW16) are only half-occupied. The Ca polyhedra do not link to one another; instead, they share edges and corners with the polyhedra in the uranyl carbonate heteropolyhedral sheets, thereby linking the sheets into a framework. The fully occupied OW9 through OW13 sites and the half-occupied OW14 and OW17 sites are located in the cavities in this framework.

== See also ==
- List of minerals
