= Earlandite =

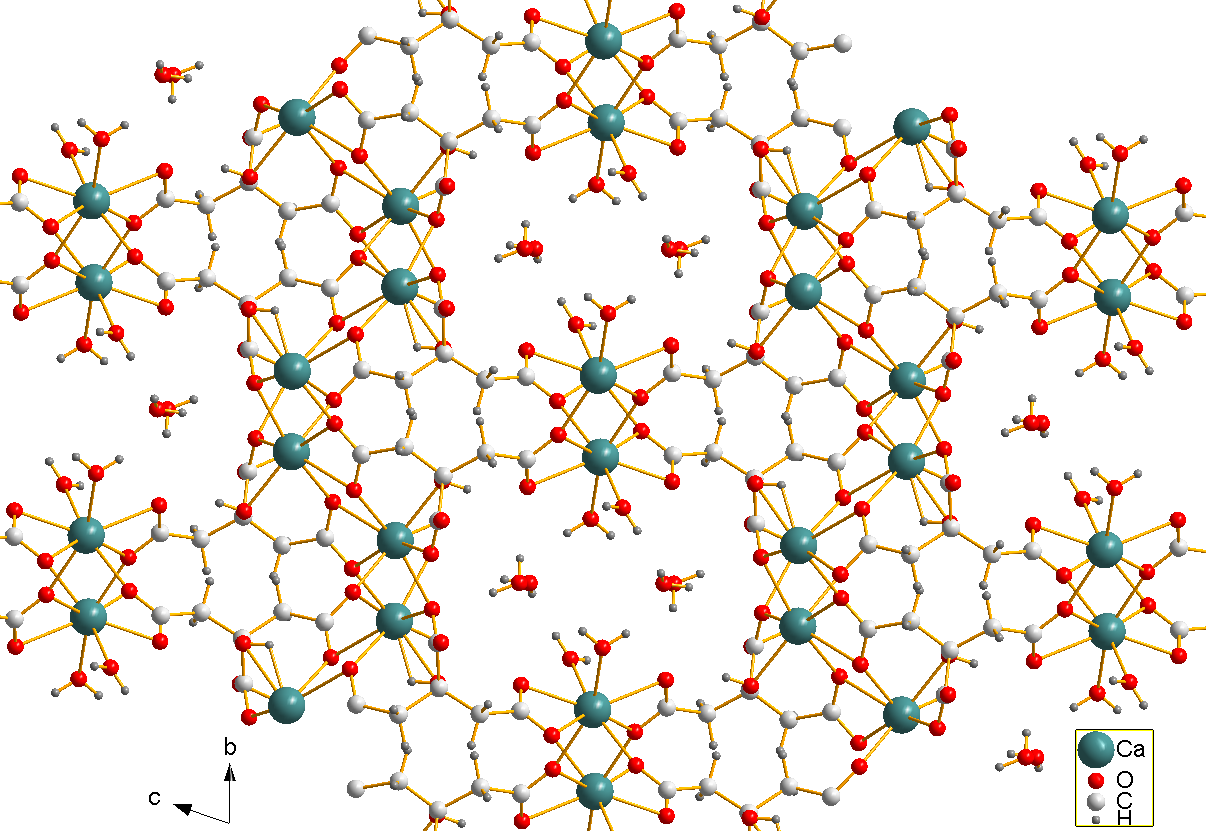

General
- Category: Organic minerals
- Formula: [Ca_{3}(C_{6}H_{5}O_{7})_{2}(H_{2}O)_{2}]·2H_{2}O
- IMA symbol: Ear
- Strunz classification: 10.AC.15
- Crystal system: Triclinic
- Space group: P1̅ (No. 2)
- Unit cell: a = 5.9466(4), b = 10.2247(8) c = 16.6496(13) [Å]; Z = 2

Identification
- Color: White, pale yellow
- Crystal habit: Nodular
- Streak: White
- Diaphaneity: Transparent
- Specific gravity: 1.80–1.95 (measured), 2.00 (calculated)
- Optical properties: Biaxial (+)
- Refractive index: n_{α} = 1.515 n_{β} = 1.530 n_{γ} = 1.580
- Birefringence: δ = 0.065
- 2V angle: 60°
- Diagnostic features: Fine-grained and wart-like nodule crystal habit
- Solubility: Insoluble

Earlandite, [Ca_{3}(C_{6}H_{5}O_{7})_{2}(H_{2}O)_{2}]·2H_{2}O, is the mineral form of calcium citrate tetrahydrate. It was first reported in 1936 and named after the English microscopist and oceanographer Arthur Earland FRSE. Earlandite occurs as warty fine-grained nodules ca. 1 mm in size in bottom sediments of the Weddell Sea, off Antarctica. Its crystal symmetry was first assigned as orthorhombic, then as monoclinic, and finally as triclinic.

== Bibliography ==
- Palache, P.; Berman H.; Frondel, C. (1960). "Dana's System of Mineralogy, Volume II: Halides, Nitrates, Borates, Carbonates, Sulfates, Phosphates, Arsenates, Tungstates, Molybdates, Etc. (Seventh Edition)" John Wiley and Sons, Inc., New York, pp. 1105-1106.
