= Zhemchuzhnikovite =

General
- Category: Minerals
- Formula: NaMg(Al,Fe^{3+})(C_{2}O_{4})_{3}·8H_{2}O

Identification
- Color: Smoky green
- Luster: Vitreous

Zhemchuzhnikovite is an oxalate mineral of organic origin; formula NaMg(Al,Fe^{3+})(C_{2}O_{4})_{3}·8H_{2}O. It forms smoky green crystals with a vitreous lustre and is found in Russian coal mines. It is named after Yury Zhemchuzhnikov (1885–1957), a Russian clay mineralogist.

== See also ==
- List of minerals named after people
