= Marklite =

Hydrated copper carbonate mineral

General
- Category: Carbonate mineral
- Formula: Cu_{5}(CO_{3})_{2}(OH)_{6} · 6H_{2}O
- IMA symbol: Mkl
- Crystal system: Monoclinic
- Crystal class: 2/m - Prismatic

Identification
- Color: Blue

Marklite is a hydrated copper carbonate mineral named after Gregor Markl, a German mineralogist at the University of Tübingen. Markl found the type specimen of marklite in the dumps of the Friedrich-Christian mine in the Black Forest Mountains in southwestern Germany. Markl specializes in crustal petrology and geochemistry and has studied the hydrothermal ore deposits of the Black Forest area. Jakub Plášil of the Institute of Physics at the Academy of Sciences of the Czech Republic and colleagues identified its structure.

Marklite crystals are long, thin blades that reach 0.2 mm in length. The mineral is chemically similar to georgeite, claraite, cuproartinite, azurite, and malachite.

== Localities ==
Germany: Friedrich-Christian Mine, Wildschapbach valley, Schapbach, Black Forest, Baden-Württemberg
