= Indenofluorene =

Class of chemical compounds

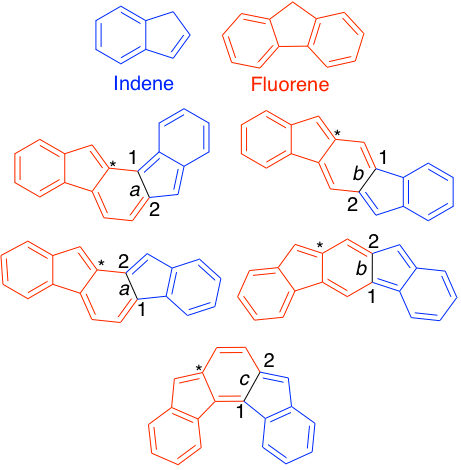
The five regioisomers of indenofluorenes with the linkages highlighted.

An indenofluorene (IF) is any of five hydrocarbons with formula C_{20}H_{12}, whose carbon skeleton is a sequence of five fused rings with 6, 5, 6, 5, and 6 carbon atoms; an arrangement that can be described as the fusion of an indene core and a fluorene core (hence the common name).

The five structural isomers (regioisomers) differ in the way the rings are connected. They have unique properties, applications, and research interests.

The name "indenofluorene" is also commonly used for any derivative of those five compounds (which are then specifically called "parent" or "unsubstituted" IFs), conceptually obtained by substituting other functional groups for some hydrogen atoms, and/or by hydrogenating the methylidene bridges (thus turning them into methylene bridges). Most IF synthesis and research work is done on these derivatives

== History ==
Despite being first synthesized in the late 19th century by Dr. S. Gabriel when he synthesized the substituted indeno [1,2-a] fluorene (shown right), the lack of robust synthesis routes left this family of molecules unexplored until the mid 20th century. After Gabriel, the next major step was the synthesis of the indeno [2,1-a] fluorene in 1939 by Weizmann et al. Next major advances came from Chardonens and Ritter with the synthesis the indeno [1,2-b] fluorene and indeno [2,1-b] fluorene in 1951. Continuing with their work, Chardonens and Ritter, synthesized indeno [1,2-a] fluorene in 1955. The final regioisomer, the indeno [2,1-c] fluorene was synthesized in 1961 by Ginsburg and Altman. Since the fifties and sixties, when these molecules were first being synthesized and discovered, improved synthetic routes and instrumentation have allowed IFs to be explored for uses in organic electronics including organic photovoltaics, organic light emitting diodes, and organic field effect transistors. Even with these advancements, the properties of IFs have remained largely unexplored. This is likely to change, however, as improvements on synthesis and expansion of IF examples continues to be an active area of research.

== Structure and nomenclature ==
There are several conventions for naming IFs currently in use. The preferred version uses a [1,2] or [2,1] to describe if the orientation of the methylene bridges on the 5 member rings are anti ([1,2]) or syn ([2,1]). The a, b, c designation indicates connectivity. a indicates there are no carbons between the indene and the starred fluorene carbon. Similarly, b indicates one carbon and c indicates two carbons.

While indenofluorenes are members of the polycyclic hydrocarbon family, they are not necessarily members of the polycyclic aromatic hydrocarbon family. For example, the fully conjugated versions, shown below, have 20π electrons making them formally anti-aromatic.

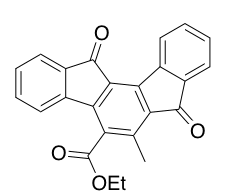
First indenofluorene scaffold synthesized by Dr. Gabriel in 1884. The molecule is a substituted version of the [1,2-a] IF scaffold.

== Stability ==
Because of the instability of parent compounds, most synthesis work and research on indenofluorenes tend to focus on the dione substituted IFs, the fully conjugated IF, or the hydrogenated (methylene bridged) IFs. Even in these molecules, though, stability remains a problem so it is not uncommon to stabilize the core indenofluorene with aromatic or bulky substituents, such as mesityl or triisopropyl silyl. Similarly, the scope of indenofluorenes have been increasing over the decades to include heteroatoms, such as sulfur, within the ring system. Other structural expansions include addition of rings to the outer edges, off the center and expanding the center core.

== Synthesis ==
There is no one way to synthesize each of the regioisomers and new routes are being discovered. Presented here are some of the published ways to get to synthetically useful versions of each IF. Preference was given to the most efficient way to get to the minimally substituted IF.

=== [1,2-a] IF ===
The first [1,2-a] IF scaffold was synthesized by Chardonens and Ritter in 1955. In their publication, they showed two ways to get to the dione of the [1,2-a] IF. The first utilizes an oxidative cleavege followed by a ring closure utilizing concentrated sulfuric acid. Later they developed a route in which they condensed an indenyl ketone with quinolone base. This intermediate was then reacted sodium dichromate to produce the final dione in decent yield. Despite having multiple routes to the dione, the synthesis of the fully conjugated IF remained elusive until 2017.

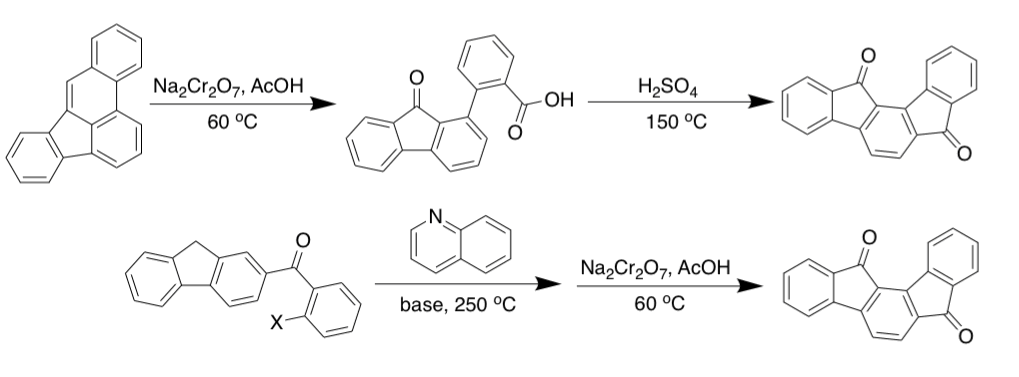

Using the synthesis presented by Chardonens and Ritter, Dressler et al. appended various R- groups at the carbonyl to produce the diol product which was then reduced using a tin chloride catalyst to get to the desired product (below). The pure IF, with no substitution, was not synthesized due to instability.

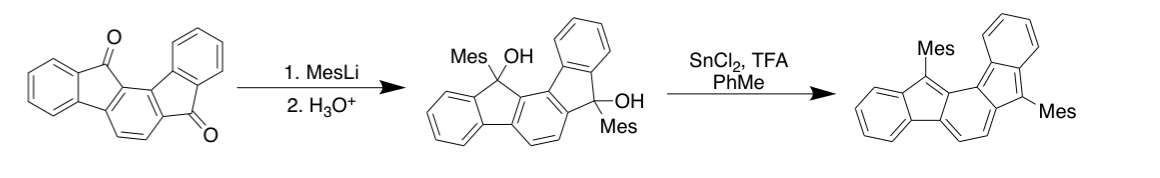

=== [1,2-b] IF ===
The first [1,2-b] IF, reported in 1951 by Deuschel and co-workers, used a route similar to the synthesis below.

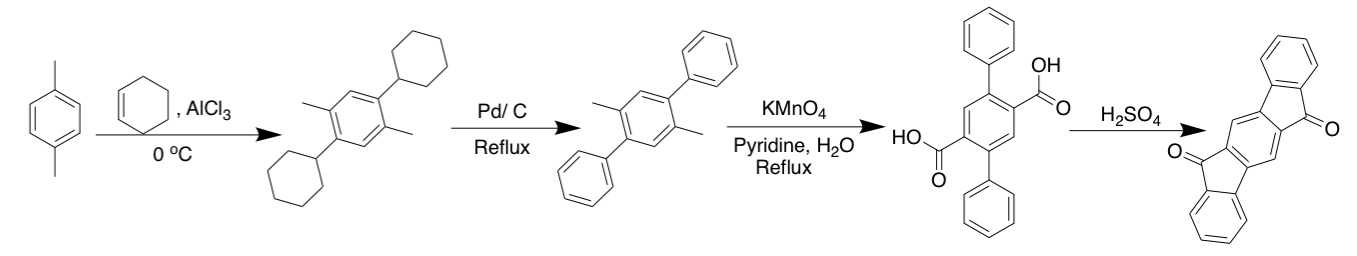

This route produced the diol which could be used to make various derivatives. The collapse method, like the one shown below, was reported by Eglington et al. in 1960. This method successfully produces the parent IF in approximately 60% yield.

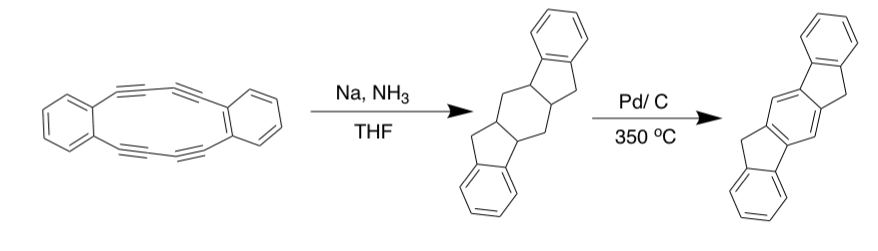

=== [2,1-a] IF ===
The [2,1-a] IF was the second one synthesized, after Gabriel's work, and was published in 1939 by Weizmann. His route is not shown here, as better yielding methods have been developed recently. Arguably the best route to the synthesis of the [2,1-a] IF is based on the work by Thirion et al. where they perform a Diels Alder reaction with 1,4-diphenyl-1,3-butadiene and dimethyl-but-2-ynedioate to build the skeleton of the IF. The center ring is aromatized using palladium on carbon to get to the diester. Saponification is performed to get to the carboxylic acid. Continuation with their route leads to the dione, in low yield, using a hot sulfuric acid closure. From the carboxylic acid, another route can be taken. If triflic acid, trifluoroacetic anhydride, and zinc bromide were added in a sealed reaction vessel to the carboxylic acid then heated, the result would be the desired dione in a 90 + percent yield

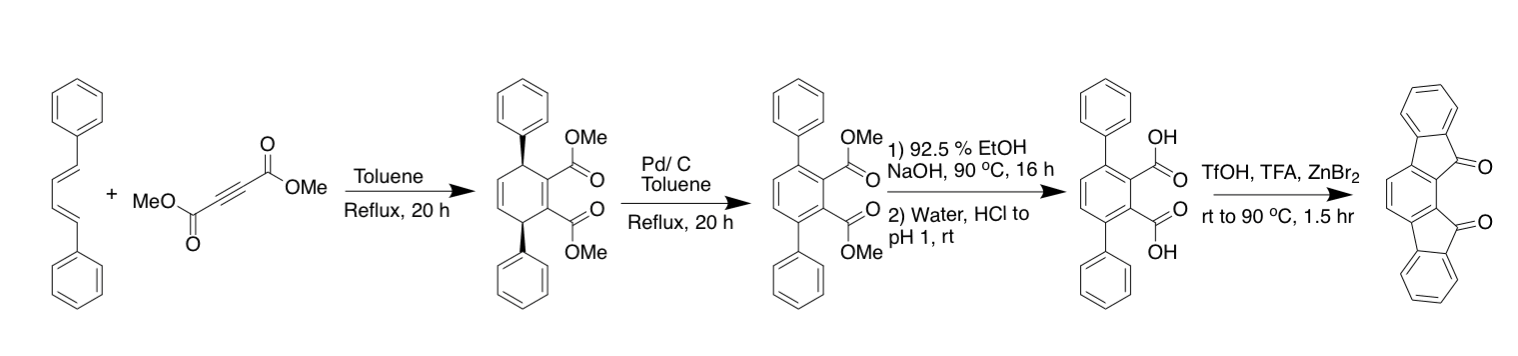

=== [2,1-b] IF ===
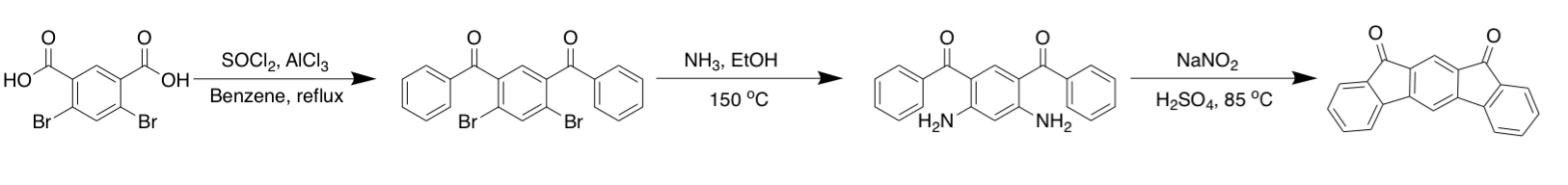

The first account of this scaffold was disclosed in 1951 by Deuschel et al. Chardonnens and Ritter, in 1955, offered the better route (shown above) in 79% yield

=== [2,1-c] IF ===
The [2,1-c] IF isomer was the last to be discovered and was published in 1961 by Ginsburg and Altman with an alternate route presented by Chardonnens and Ritter. Shown below is the original synthesis to the [2,1-c] dione.

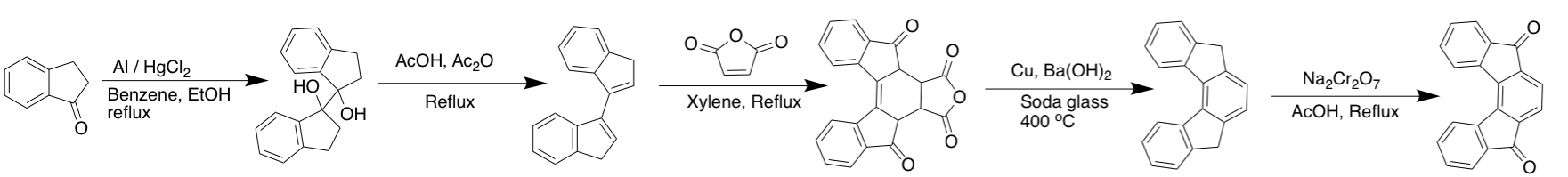

In 2012, the first example of the fully conjugated IF was disclosed by the Haley group at the University of Oregon as an unpublished work

An alternate route, not shown here, was presented by Youngs et al. where they produced the [2,1-c] IF in a collapse method similar to that disclosed by Eglington for the [1,2-b] IF. The yield over the two steps was reported to be 91%

== Properties ==
Properties of indenofluorenes vary significantly between each regioisomer and even within each regioisomer as substitutions change. Presented here are the general trends for each indenofluorene.

=== [1,2-a] IF ===
The properties of this regioisomer are not well known as of this point owing to the lack of synthetic routes. That said, the [1,2-a] IF is the only one that shows centrosymmetry. Dressler et al. recently published a paper on the first fully conjugated [1,2 - a] IF, and within that paper, they found a first reduction potential of -0.67 V

=== [1,2-b] IF ===
The [1,2-b] IF is distinguished from the other regioisomers first by having rotational symmetry. In crystal form, [1,2- b] IFs generally show one dimensional column stacking., however, the stacking can be tuned based on the substitution of the molecule. For example, the addition of fluorine to the molecule resulted in face to face π- stacking. No matter what substitution is present, though, the molecules pack fairly closely with distances of about 3.30 Å

Kamatsu et al., in their work with [1,2-b] IFs, have shown that they behave as n-type semiconductors. The best n-type behavior was shown in the dione of the [1,2-b] IF in which the para positions were substituted with fluorine, which was presented by Yamahita et al. to be 0.17 cm2/Vċs.

Cyclic voltammetry data has shown that various [1,2-b] IFs, can reversibly accept two electrons with the first reduction occurring at -0.8 V. The parent dione has a first reduction potential of -1.19 V, and halogenated versions reduce around -0.6 V. The fully conjugated version, first postulated by Deuschel in the 1950s, is believed to be even better as an electron carrier when compared to the analogus fullerene. This is believed to be due to a low lying LUMO, which was calculated in the Haley Group at the University of Oregon and corroborated by the Tobe group via crystal structure analysis. Confirmation of these low lying LUMOs wis provided by a tips acetylene appended, on the methyl bridges and the center ring, fully conjugated [1,2-b] IF had a first reduction of -0.62 V. The improvement in reduction potential is linked to the fact that the addition of 2 electrons yields an aromatic molecule with increased stability. However, the addition of the steric bulk required to make the molecule stable, lead to a herringbone crystal packing which is not favorable for electron mobility through the crystal.

=== [2,1-a] IF ===
Similar to indeno [1,2 -b] fluorenes, see above, indeno [2,1-a] fluorenes show strong biradical character. This biradical nature is both an advantage, in that it is believed that [2,1-a] IFs will make excellent organic electron carriers, and a curse, owing to the decreased stability of the molecule. The first reduction potential of the fully conjugated mesityl substituted compound is reported to be -1.51 V. Other versions of this IF regioisomer have had first reduction potentials as low as -2.48 V. As such, little work with this regioisomer has been published to-date and its properties remain largely unknown. In 2022, an unsymmetrically disubstituted formally antiaromatic [2,1-a]IF derivative was reported by the Das group that displays strong antiaromaticity of the ortho-quinoidal as-indacene core and a small optical band gap (1.55 eV). S. Das and co-workers reported an unprecedented synthesis of a tetrabenzo-fused [2,1-a]IF derivative bearing cyano-substitution that exhibits experimental evidence of an open-shell singlet ground state with small diradical character despite a small singlet-triplet energy gap. This is reported as a rare observation, as correlations between the structural features and the properties of different diradicaloid systems usually indicate an increased diradical character index as the energy separation between the singlet and triplet states decreases.

=== [2,1-b] IF ===
Similarly to the [2,1 - a] IF, [2,1 - b] IFs show a mirror plain of symmetry and strong biradical character. The first reduction of the fully conjugated methyl appended [2,1 - b] IF occurs at -1.13 V and the second reduction is at -2.03 V.

=== [2,1-c] IF ===
Like the other [2,1-a] isomers, this version also shows mirror plane symmetry, and compared to the [1,2-a]IF, there is some notable progress for this isomer. Fully conjugated formally antiaromatic [2,1-c]IF derivatives were first reported in 2013 by the Haley group, and later in 2020 and 2022 by the Das and Podlech research groups, respectively. In 2023, Das and Pandey et al. reported unsymmetrically disubstituted [2,1-c]IF derivatives as well as the first push-pull [2,1-c]IF derivative. The authors reported ambipolar charge transport for [2,1-c]IF systems, exhibiting balanced hole and electron mobilities on the order of 10^{−3} cm^{2} V^{−1} s^{−1}.

== Applications ==
Overall the applications for IFs are anticipated to be as replacement for fullerenes in organic electronic systems such as OLEDs, OFETs, and OPVCs. However, as IFs have been sparsely studied, to this point, actual applications and integration into products have yet to be achieved. Not all of the IF regioisomers are suited to incorporation into organic electronics mostly owing to difficult synthesis and instability. However, as research progresses, advances in synthesis are sure to be made. Similarly, as molecular libraries expand, trends in stability and electron carrying ability are likely to develop.
