= Levinsonite-(Y) =

Oxalate-sulfate mineral

General
- Category: Minerals
- Formula: (empirical) Y_{0.3}Nd_{0.2}La_{0.1}Sm_{0.1}Gd_{0.1}Al(SO_{4})_{2}(C_{2}O_{4})·12(H_{2}O)
- Strunz classification: 10.AB.70
- Dana classification: 50.01.09.03
- Crystal system: monoclinic

Identification
- Colour: colourless
- Crystal habit: prismatic
- Fracture: brittle, irregular
- Luster: vitreous
- Streak: white
- Density: 2.09

Levinsonite-(Y) is a rare organic mineral named in honor of Alfred A. Levinson (1927-2005), Professor Emeritus of mineralogy at the University of Calgary. It was named in part because of his origination of the internationally used nomenclature for rare-earth minerals, the Levinson modifier, which is a standard in mineralogical nomenclature and allows for the more precise identification and classification of rare-earth minerals.

The type material for Levinsonite-(Y) is kept at the University of Michigan, and the Smithsonian National Museum of Natural History in Washington, D.C.

== Discovery ==
In 1981, T. Dennis Coskren and Robert J. Lauf began investigating a large number of unusual minerals at the Alum Cave Bluff (ACB), Great Smoky Mountains National Park, Tennessee, USA. Coskren and Lauf discovered three new rare-earth element minerals, which have subsequently been named coskrenite-(Ce), levinsonite-(Y), and zugshunstite-(Ce). After submission to the International Mineralogical Association (IMA), the naming of Levinsonite-(Y) was approved by the Commission on New Minerals and Mineral Names and given the IMA number 1996-057.
