= Weddellite =

Mineral form of calcium oxalate dihydrate

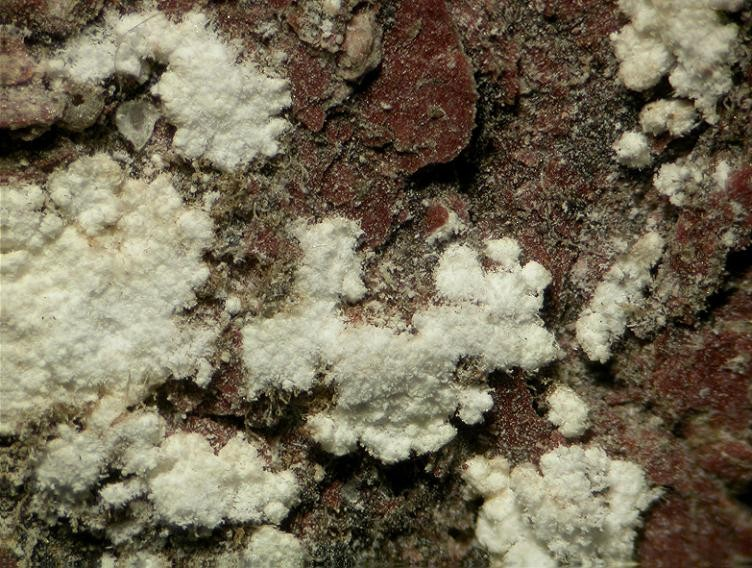
- White weddellite crust from the Cerchiara mine, Borghetto di Vara, Liguria, Italy

General
- Category: Oxalate minerals
- Formula: CaC_{2}O_{4}·2H_{2}O
- IMA symbol: Wed
- Strunz classification: 10.AB.40
- Crystal system: Tetragonal
- Crystal class: Dipyramidal (4/m); H-M symbol: (4/m)
- Space group: I4/m
- Unit cell: a = 12.371, c = 7.357 [Å]; Z = 8

Identification
- Color: Colorless to white, may be yellowish brown to brown from impurities
- Crystal habit: Isolated crystals, may be corroded
- Twinning: Single or multiple
- Cleavage: Good on {010}
- Fracture: Conchoidal
- Mohs scale hardness: 4
- Luster: Vitreous
- Streak: White
- Diaphaneity: Transparent
- Specific gravity: 1.94
- Optical properties: Uniaxial (+)
- Refractive index: n_{ω} = 1.523 n_{ε} = 1.544
- Birefringence: δ = 0.021
- Other characteristics: Dehydrates on air exposure

Weddellite (CaC_{2}O_{4}·2H_{2}O) is a mineral form of hydrated calcium oxalate named for occurrences of millimeter-sized crystals found in bottom sediments of the Weddell Sea, off Antarctica. Occasionally, weddellite partially dehydrates to the monohydrate whewellite, forming excellent pseudomorphs of grainy whewellite after weddellite's short tetragonal dipyramids. It was first described in 1936 but only named in 1942.

== Structural properties ==
Weddellite, or calcium oxalate dihydrate, crystallises in a tetragonal system: the classic crystal shape is the eight-face bipyramid. Using bright field microscopy, the weddellite crystals are recognised easily by their shape, reminiscent of a postal envelope. More complex shapes of weddellite are possible; the dumbbell shape is not rare and has no precise angles or sides. This form is, in reality, a microcrystalline agglomerate that takes the shape of a biconcave disc. Weddellite crystals are poorly birefringent and do not show any interference pattern under polarised light.

== Biological role ==
Whewellite (CaC_{2}O_{4}·1H_{2}O) and weddellite (CaC_{2}O_{4}·2H_{2}O) are the most common mineral components of renal calculi (kidney stones).

== Occurrence ==
Weddellite occurs as authigenic crystals in sea floor mud. It also has been reported in cacti, peat bearing sediments and in calcite-bearing lacustrine sediments. It occurs with whewellite, urea, phosphammite and aphthitalite.

If oxalic acid is used to clean any mineral sample that contains calcium, weddellite and whewellite may be produced on the sample.
