= Abellaite =

Hydrous carbonate mineral

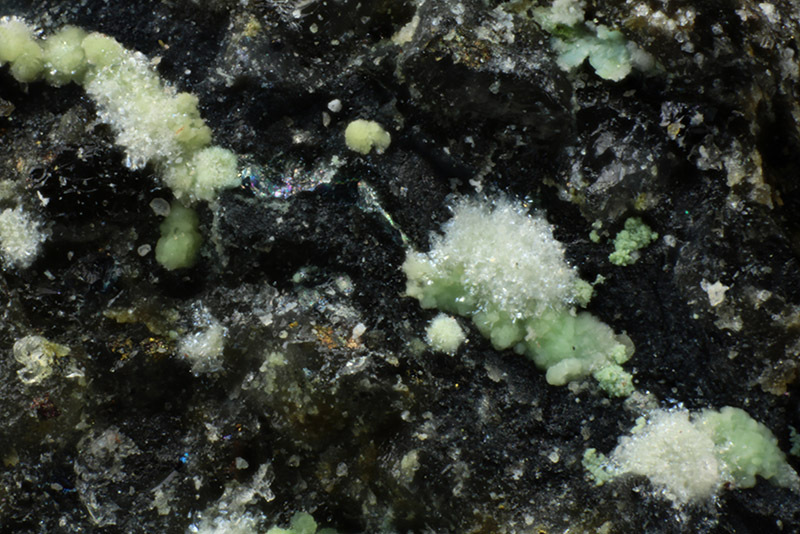
- White abellaite crystals from the Eureka mine, in Catalonia

General
- Category: Carbonate mineral
- Formula: NaPb_{2}(CO_{3})_{2}(OH)
- IMA symbol: Abe
- Strunz classification: 5.BE.X
- Crystal system: Hexagonal
- Crystal class: 6mm - Dihexagonal-pyramidal
- Space group: P31c (no. 159)

Identification
- Color: Colorless to white
- Luster: Vitreous
- Specific gravity: 5.93

Abellaite is a hydrous carbonate mineral discovered in July 2010 the abandoned Eureka uranium mine in the village of La Torre de Capdella (Lleida province), Catalonia, Spain. The ideal chemical formula of abellaite is NaPb_{2}(CO_{3})_{2}(OH). It is named in honor of Joan Abella i Creus, a Catalan gemologist who has long studied minerals from the Eureka mine and first found abellaite in the mine. A team composed, among others, by Jordi Ibáñez-Insa from the Institute of Earth Sciences Jaume Almera (CSIC) and by Joan Viñals and Xavier Llovet from the University of Barcelona, identified and characterized the mineral's structure and chemical composition.

Abellaite crystals are colorless to white, with a glassy or pearly appearance, and are easily crumbled. The mineral has a known synthetic analogue and is chemically similar to sanrománite. Robert Hazen et al. predicted its existence in 2015.

== Localities ==
- Catalonia, Spain: Eureka mine, Castell-estaó, La Torre de Cabdella, La Vall Fosca, El Pallars Jussà, Lleida, Catalonia
- Russia: Yubileinaya pegmatite, Karnasurt Mountain, Murmansk Oblast, Lovozersky District
