= Braunerite =

Hydrous uranyl carbonate mineral

General
- Category: Carbonate mineral
- Formula: K_{2}Ca(UO_{2})(CO_{3})_{3}·6H_{2}O
- IMA symbol: Bun
- Crystal system: Monoclinic
- Crystal class: 2/m - Prismatic

Identification
- Color: Yellow
- Other characteristics: Radioactive

Braunerite is a hydrous uranyl carbonate mineral discovered by Jakub Plášil of the Institute of Physics at the Academy of Sciences of the Czech Republic and colleagues in the Svornost mine in the Jáchymov ore district, Western Bohemia, Czech Republic.

Braunerite crystals are yellow and have a glassy luster. The mineral is chemically similar to línekite. The type material is deposited in the collections of the Department of Mineralogy and Petrology, National Museum, Prague, Czech Republic, and the mineralogical collections of the Natural History Museum of Los Angeles County.

== Localities ==
Czech Republic: Svornost Mine, Jáchymov, Jáchymov District, Krušné Hory Mts, Karlovy Vary Region, Bohemia
