= Tinnunculite =

Organic mineral

General
- Category: Organic mineral
- Formula: C_{5}H_{4}N_{4}O_{3} · 2H_{2}O
- IMA symbol: Tnn
- Crystal system: Monoclinic
- Crystal class: 2/m - prismatic
- Space group: '

Identification
- Color: White
- Tenacity: Earthy (dull)

Tinnunculite is a naturally occurring form of dihydrate of uric acid. It should not be confused with the identically-named proposed mineral species 'tinnunculite' that forms when droppings from a European kestrel react with the burning dumps of coal mines and quarries. The name tinnunculite is derived from the kestrel's binomial name, "Falco tinnunculus", which is itself derived from the Latin word tinnunculus, meaning "kestrel", from tinnulus, meaning "shrill". Tinnunculite is a naturally occurring form of the same type of origin.

The mineral is a dihydrate of uricite to which it is visually very similar. Tinnunculite is chemically similar to other organic minerals: guanine, uricite; also acetamide, kladnoite. A new mineral proposal with the same name but slightly different formula (C_{10}H_{12}N_{8}O_{8}) was submitted by Chesnokov & Shcherbakova and ultimately rejected by the International Mineralogical Association (IMA) on the basis of being of anthropogenic origin.

== Localities ==
Russia: Mount Rasvumchorr, Khibiny Massif, Kola Peninsula, Murmanskaja Oblast, Northern Region.

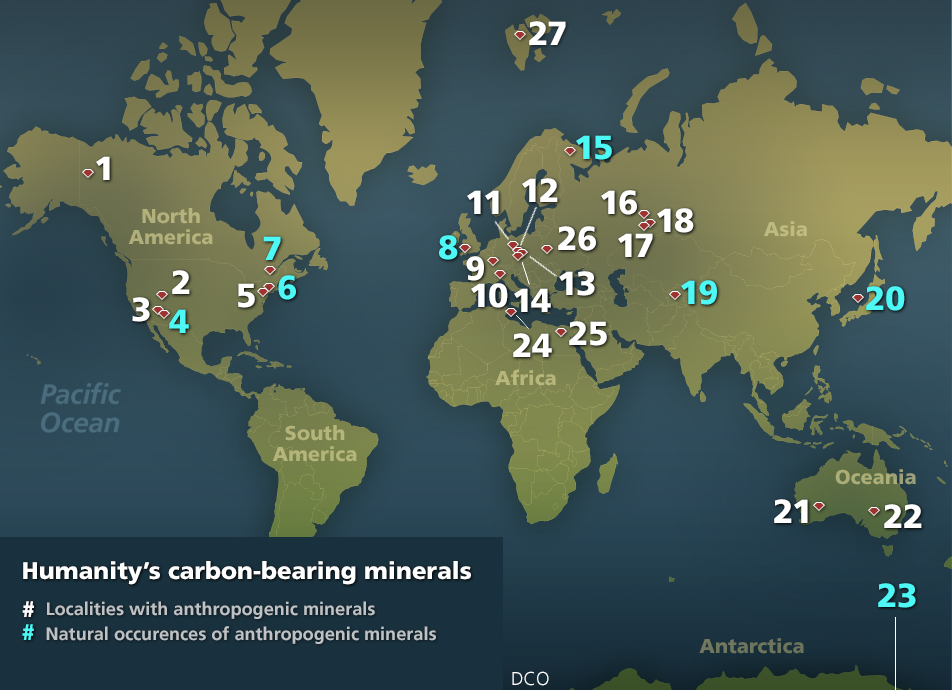
Tinnunculite is found at map location 15, Mt. Rasvumchorr, Khibiny Mountains, Kola Peninsula, Russia

== See also ==
- Organic compounds (minerals)
- Hyraceum
