= Idrialite =

Rare hydrocarbon mineral

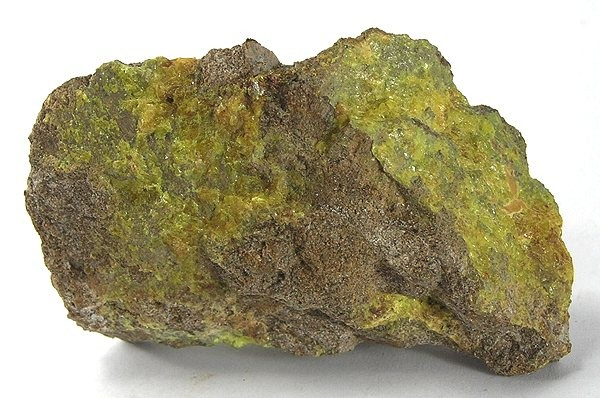
- Idrialite, Skaggs Springs Mine, Sonoma County, California (size: 6.3 x 4.1 x 1.8 cm

General
- Category: Organic mineral
- Formula: C_{22}H_{14}
- IMA symbol: Id
- Strunz classification: 10.BA.20
- Dana classification: 50.03.08.01
- Crystal system: Orthorhombic; Unknown space group
- Unit cell: a = 8.07, b = 6.42 c = 27.75 [Å]; Z = 4

Identification
- Color: Greenish yellow, light brown, colorless
- Cleavage: {001}, perfect; {100}, poor
- Fracture: Conchoidal
- Mohs scale hardness: 1.5
- Luster: Vitreous to adamantine
- Specific gravity: 1.236
- Optical properties: Biaxial (+)
- Refractive index: n_{α}= 1.557 n_{β} = 1.734 n_{γ} = 2.07
- Pleochroism: X = pale yellow; Y = Z = yellow
- 2V angle: 84°
- Ultraviolet fluorescence: Short UV=blue, orange, yellow, green white

Idrialite is a rare hydrocarbon mineral with approximate chemical formula C_{22}H_{14}.

Idrialite usually occurs as soft orthorhombic crystals, is usually greenish yellow to light brown in color with bluish fluorescence. It is named after Idrija, town in Slovenia, where its occurrence was first described.

The mineral has also been called idrialine, and branderz in German It has also been called inflammable cinnabar due to its combustibility and association with cinnabar ores in the source locality. A mineral found in the Skaggs Springs location of California was described in 1925 and named curtisite, but was eventually found to consist of the same compounds as idrialite, in somewhat different amounts. Thus curtisite is now considered to be merely a variety of idrialite.

== Discovery and occurrence ==
Idrialite was first described in 1832 for an occurrence in the Idrija region west of Ljubljana, northwestern Slovenia, mixed with clay, pyrite, quartz and gypsum associated with cinnabar.

It also occurs at the Skaggs Springs location in Sonoma County, in western Lake County, and in the Knoxville Mine in Napa County, California. It has also been reported from localities in France, Slovakia and Ukraine.

In the Skaggs Springs occurrence, the mineral occurs in a hot spring area of the Franciscan formation, around a vent in the sandstone that gave off flammable gases. The mineral was described in 1925 and named "curtisite" after the local resident L. Curtis who called attention to it. The crystals are square or six sided flakes, 1 mm in diameter, yellow to pistachio green in transmitted light. It is associated with opaline silica, realgar (arsenic sulfide) and metacinnabarite (mercuric sulfide), which had been deposited in that order before it.

== Composition and properties ==
The Curtisite variety is only slightly soluble in hot acetone, amyl acetate, butanol, petroleum ether. The solubility is 0.5% or less in hot carbon bisulfide, carbon tetrachloride, chloroform, diethyl ether, or boiling benzene; about 1.5% in toluene, about 2.5% in xylene, and over 10% in hot aniline. The material purified by repeated recrystallization melts at 360-370 C while turning very black. It sublimes giving very thin iridescent colors.

Raman spectroscopy studies indicate that it may be a mixture of complex hydrocarbons including benzonaphthothiophenes (chemical formula: C_{16}H_{10}S) and dinaphthothiophenes (chemical formula: C_{20}H_{12}S).

Curtisite and idrialite have been found to be unique complex mixtures of over 100 polyaromatic hydrocarbons (PAHs) consisting of six specific PAH structural series with each member of a series differing from the previous member by addition of another aromatic ring. The curtisite and idrialite samples contained many of the same components but in considerably different relative amounts.

The major PAH constituents of the curtisite sample were: picene (a PAH with 5 fused benzene rings), dibenzo[a,h]fluorene, 11H-indeno[2,1-a]phenanthrene, benzo[b]phenanthro[2,1-d]thiophene, indenofluorenes, chrysene, and their methyl- and dimethyl-substituted homologues; the major components in the idrialite sample were higher-molecular-weight PAH, i.e. benzonaphthofluorenes (molecular weight 316), benzoindenofluorenes (MW 304) and benzopicene (MW 328), in addition to the compounds found in the curtisite sample.

Curtisite is also associated with small amounts of a dark brown oil, that appears to be responsible for some of the yellow color and most of the fluorescence, and can be separated by recrystallization.

Based on the composition, it was conjectured that the compounds were produced by medium-temperature pyrolysis of organic matter, then further modified by extended equilibration at elevated temperatures in the subsurface and by recrystallization during migration.

When distilled, it produces the mineral wax idrialin.
