= Yuri Zhemchuzhnikov =

Russian and Soviet geologist (1885–1957)

Yuri Apollonovich Zhemchuzhnikov (Russian: Юрий Аполлонович Жемчужников; 8 May [O.S. 26 April] 1885 in Samara – 9 January 1957 in Leningrad) was a Russian and Soviet geologist. He became professor at the Leningrad Mining University in 1920 and was a noted expert in petrography. The mineral zhemchuzhnikovite is named after him.
