= Organic mineral =

Natural compound occurring in mineral form

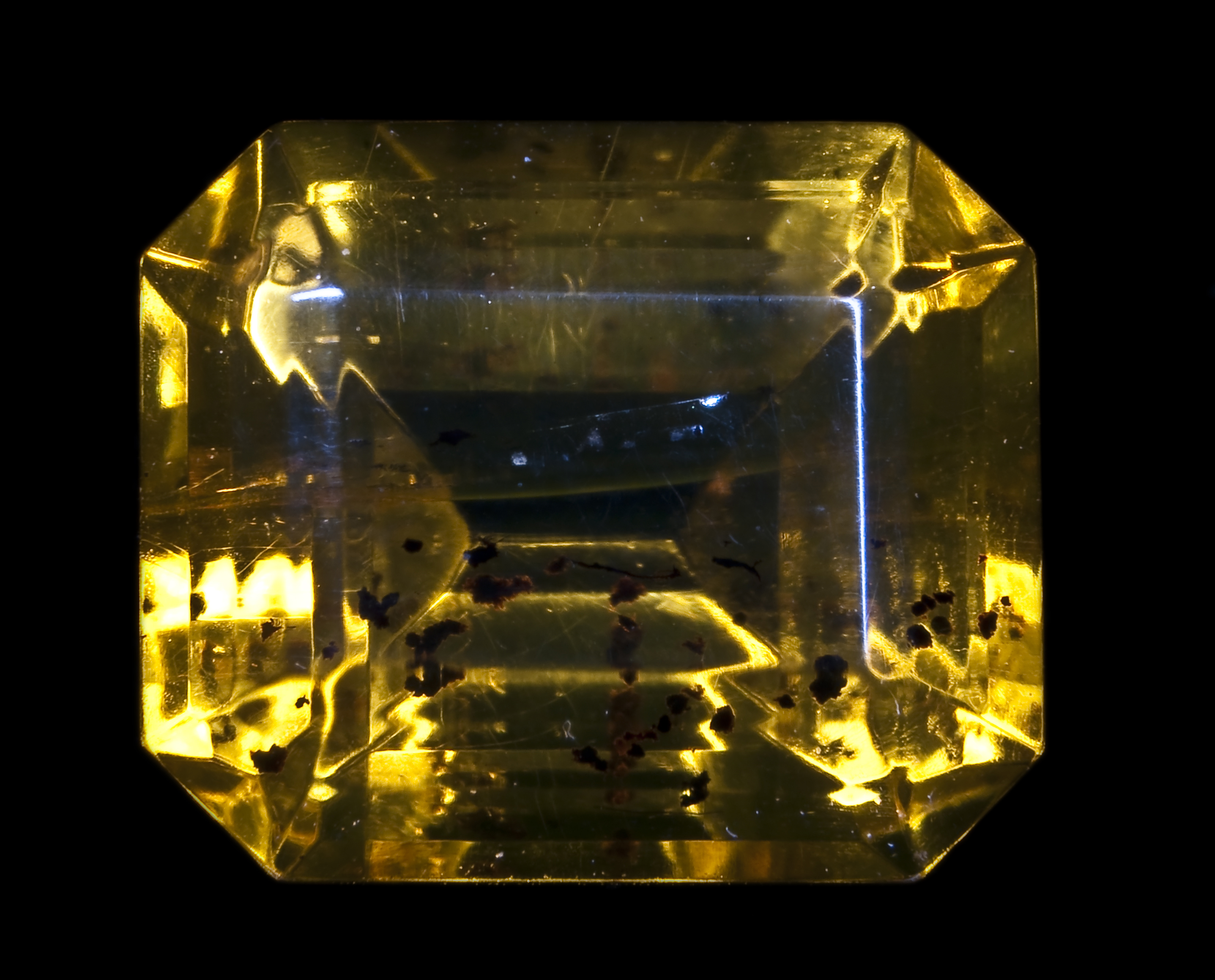
Mellite gemstone from Hungary

An organic mineral is an organic compound in mineral form. An organic compound is any compound containing carbon, aside from some simple ones discovered before 1828. There are three classes of organic mineral: hydrocarbons (containing just hydrogen and carbon), salts of organic acids, and miscellaneous. Organic minerals are rare, and tend to have specialized settings such as fossilized cacti and bat guano. Mineralogists have used statistical models to predict that there are more undiscovered organic mineral species than known ones.

== Definition ==
In general, an organic compound is defined as any compound containing carbon, but some compounds are excepted for historical reasons. Before 1828, chemists thought that organic and inorganic compounds were fundamentally different, with the former requiring a vital force that could only come from living organisms. Then Friedrich Wöhler synthesized urea by heating an inorganic substance called ammonium cyanate, proving that organic compounds could also be created through an inorganic process. Nevertheless, carbon-containing compounds that were already classified as inorganic were not reclassified. These include carbides, simple oxides of carbon such as carbon monoxide and carbon dioxide, carbonates, cyanides and elemental carbon minerals such as graphite and diamond.

Organic minerals are rare and difficult to find, often forming crusts on fractures. Early descriptions of organic minerals include mellite in 1793, humboldtine in 1821 and idrialite in 1832.

== Types ==
In the proposed 10th edition of the Nickel-Strunz classification, organic minerals are one of the ten primary classes of minerals. The class is divided into three subclasses: salts of organic acids, hydrocarbons, and miscellaneous organic minerals.

=== Hydrocarbons ===
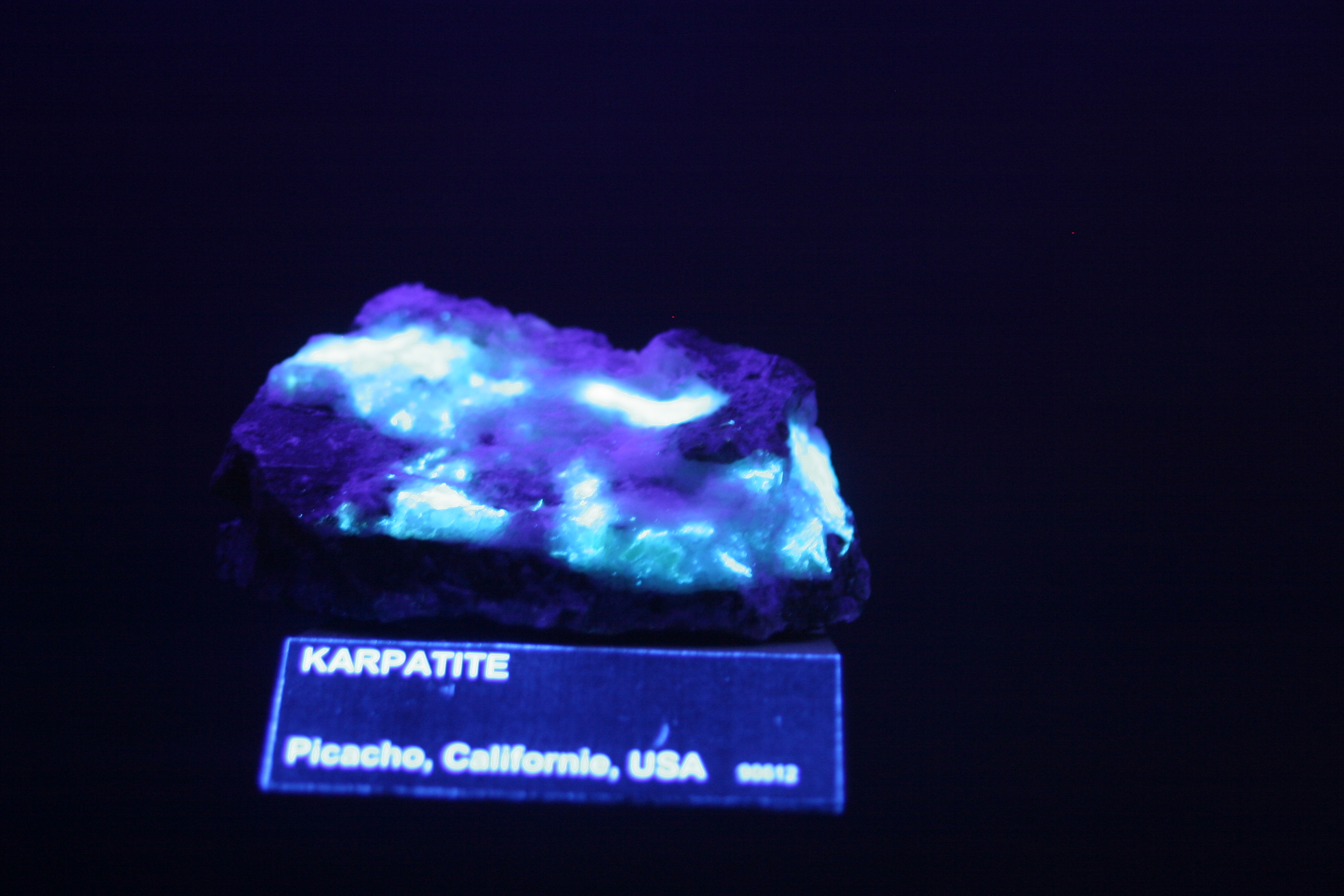
Blue fluorescence in a carpathite mineral under ultraviolet light.

As the name implies, hydrocarbon minerals are composed entirely of carbon and hydrogen. Some are inorganic forms of polycyclic aromatic hydrocarbon (PAH) compounds. For example, a rare mineral known as either carpathite, karpatite or pendletonite is nearly pure coronene. Carpathite is deposited as pale yellow flakes in cracks between diorite (an igneous rock) and argillite (a sedimentary rock); it is prized for a beautiful blue fluorescence under ultraviolet light. Other PAH compounds appearing as minerals include fluorene as kratochvilite; and anthracene as ravatite. Others are mixtures: curtisite contains several PAH compounds, including dibenzofluorine, picene, and chrysene, while the most common components of idrialite are tribenzofluorenes. One theory for their formation involves burial of PAH compounds until they reach a temperature where pyrolysis can occur, followed by hydrothermal transport towards the surface, during which the composition of minerals that precipitate out depends on the temperature.

=== Salts of organic acids ===
A salt of an organic acid is a compound in which an organic acid is combined with a base. The largest such group is the oxalates, which combine C_{2}O^{2−}_{4} with cations. A large fraction have water molecules attached; examples include weddellite, whewellite, and zhemchuzhnikovite. Oxalates are often associated with particular fossilized biological materials, for example weddellite with cacti; oxammite with guano and egg shells of birds; glushinskite with lichen; humboldtine, stepanovite and whewellite with leaf litter; and humboldtine, stepanovite and whewellite with coal. Where plant material such as tree roots interacts with ore bodies, one can find oxalates with transition metals (moolooite, wheatleyite).

Other salts include salts of formate (HCOO^{−}) such as formicaite and dashkovaite; and salts of acetate (CH_{3}COO^{−}) such as acetamide and calclacite. Joanneumite is the first isocyanurate mineral to be officially recognized.

=== Miscellaneous organic compounds ===
Some organic minerals do not fall into the above categories. These include nickel porphyrin (NiC_{31}H_{32}N_{4}), closely related to biological molecules such as heme (a porphyrin with iron as the cation) and chlorophyll (a magnesium cation), but does not itself occur in biological systems. Instead, it is found on the surface of fractures in oil shales. Urea derived from bat guano and urine also occurs as a mineral in very arid conditions. In the Dana and Strunz classifications, amber is considered an organic mineral, but this classification is not approved by the International Mineralogical Association (IMA). Other sources call it a mineraloid because it has no crystal structure.

== Carbon minerals ==
As of 2016, the IMA recognized ten hydrocarbon minerals, ten miscellaneous organic minerals, 21 oxalates and over 24 other salts of organic acids. However, Robert Hazen and colleagues analyzed the known species of carbon-bearing minerals using a statistical technique called the Large Number of Rare Events (LNRE) model, and predicted that at least 145 such minerals are yet to be discovered. Many undiscovered organic minerals may be related to known species by various substitutions of cations. Hazen et al. predict that at least three more PAH crystals (pyrene, chrysene and tetracene) should occur as minerals. There are 72 known synthetic oxalates, some of which could occur in nature, particularly near fossil organisms. To encourage the discovery of more carbon minerals, the Deep Carbon Observatory launched an initiative known as the Carbon Mineral Challenge.

== See also ==
- Classification of organic minerals
- Kerogen
