= Arthur Earland =

Arthur Earland FRSE FRMS (3 November 1866 – 27 March 1958) was a British oceanographer and microscopist. He was an expert on Foraminifera and gives his name to Earlandite. He was skilled in the identification of microscopic shells in a manner indicative of likely oil-bearing capacity.

== Life ==
He was born on 3 November 1866 in Lewisham in London the son of a schoolmaster. In 1885 he joined the Civil Service working in the British Post Office on procedures. He is remembered however for his important microscope studies, partly undertaken with Edward Heron-Allen. He was one of the several researchers working on the vast materials brought back from the Challenger expedition.

In June 1933 his research from Vol VII of the Discovery Investigations was published. In 1942 he was elected a Fellow of the Royal Society of Edinburgh. His proposers were D’Arcy Wentworth Thompson, William T. H. Williamson, Robert James Douglas Graham and James Ritchie.

He died on 27 March 1958.

== Publications ==
Mainly co-written with Edward Heron-Allen

- Foraminifera (1922)
- The British Antarctic (Terra Nova) Expedition, 1910 (1922)
- Foraminifera of the Kerimba Archipelago (1914)
- The Foraminifea of the Shore Sand of Bognor, Sussex (1905)
- The Foraminifera of Clare Island District, County Mayo (1913)

== See also ==
- Earlandia, a genus of prehistoric foraminifera
