= Stracherite =

General
- Category: Carbonate mineral
- Formula: BaCa_{6}(SiO_{4})_{2}[(PO_{4})(CO_{3})]2F
- Crystal system: Trigonal
- Crystal class: 3m (3 2/m) - Hexagonal Scalenohedral

Identification

Stracherite is a mineral discovered at the Hatrurim Formation in Israel, by Evgeny Galuskin of the University of Silesia in Katowice, Poland, and colleagues. The mineral has a surprising structure composed of a unique mix of elements. It is the first carbonate-bearing member of a group of very rare minerals called the nabimusaite group, named for a similar mineral that also occurs at the Haturim Formation. Galuskin named the mineral in honor of Glenn Stracher of East Georgia State College, USA, an expert on uncontrolled coal fires.

== Localities ==
Israel: Hatrurim Formation, Negev
