= Alterite =

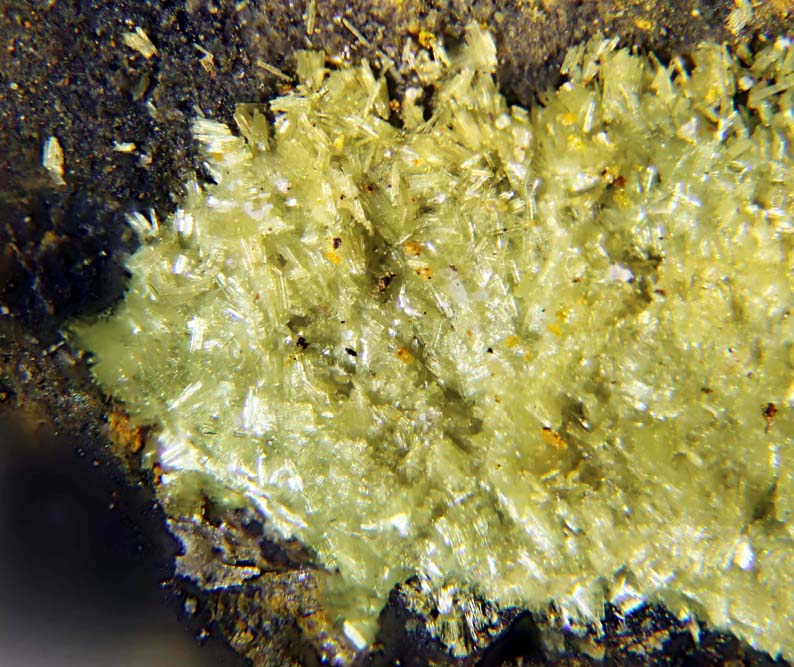
- Alterite found at its only known locality worldwide

General
- Category: Minerals
- Formula: Zn_{2}Fe^{3+}_{4}(SO_{4})_{4}(C_{2}O_{4})_{2}(OH)_{4}·17H_{2}O
- IMA symbol: Air

Identification
- Color: Yellow-green
- Luster: Vitreous
- Diaphaneity: Transparent

Alterite (IMA symbol: Atr) is a yellow-green mineral with the chemical formula Zn_{2}Fe^{3+}_{4}(SO_{4})_{4}(C_{2}O_{4})_{2}(OH)_{4}·17H_{2}O. Its type locality is Coconino County, Arizona. It is found exclusively in logs that have mineralized.
