= Parisite-(La) =

Carbonate-fluoride mineral

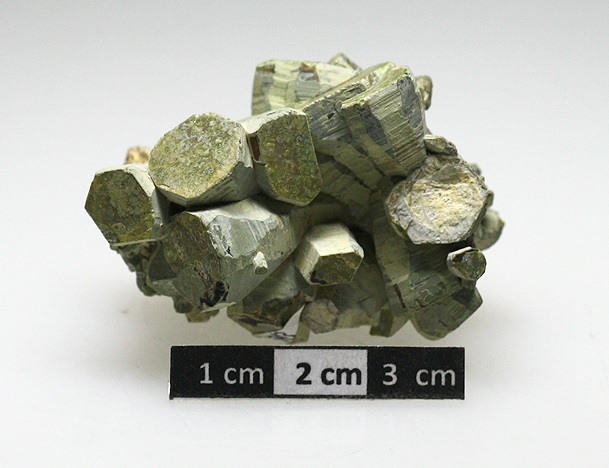

General
- Category: Carbonate mineral
- Formula: CaLa_{2}(CO_{3})_{3}3F_{2}
- IMA symbol: Pst-La
- Crystal system: Monoclinic

Identification
- Color: Brown

Parisite-(La) is mineral discovered by Daniel Atencio of the University of São Paulo and colleagues in the Mula claim, Bahia, Brazil. Parisite-(La) is the lanthanum analog of parisite-(Ce), which has the same structure, but with cerium substituted for lanthanum. Parisite-(La) is chemically similar to synchysite-(La).

The type material for parisite-(La) resides in the mineralogical collections of the Museu de Ciência e Técnica, Escola de Minas, Universidade Federal de Ouro Preto, Minas Gerais, Brazil, and at the University of Arizona Mineral Museum, Tucson, Arizona.

== Localities ==
Brazil: Mula claim, Tapera, Novo Horizonte, Bahia
