= Roymillerite =

General
- Category: Minerals
- Formula: Pb_{24}Mg_{9}(Si_{10}O_{28})(CO_{3})_{10}(BO_{3})(SiO_{4})(OH)_{13}O_{5}
- IMA symbol: Roy
- Crystal system: triclinic crystal system
- Space group: P1̅

Identification
- Color: colorless, slightly pink
- Luster: vitreous
- Specific gravity: 9.81

Roymillerite is a solid colorless transparent crystalline mineral. It has a non-trivial crystal structure.

Roymillerite was found in the Otavi Valley (Namibia). Named after geologist and mineralogist Roy McG. Miller.

The sample is stored in the Swedish Museum of Natural History in Stockholm under the number 20080176.

== See also ==
- List of minerals
- List of minerals named after people
