= Picene =

- Skeletal formula

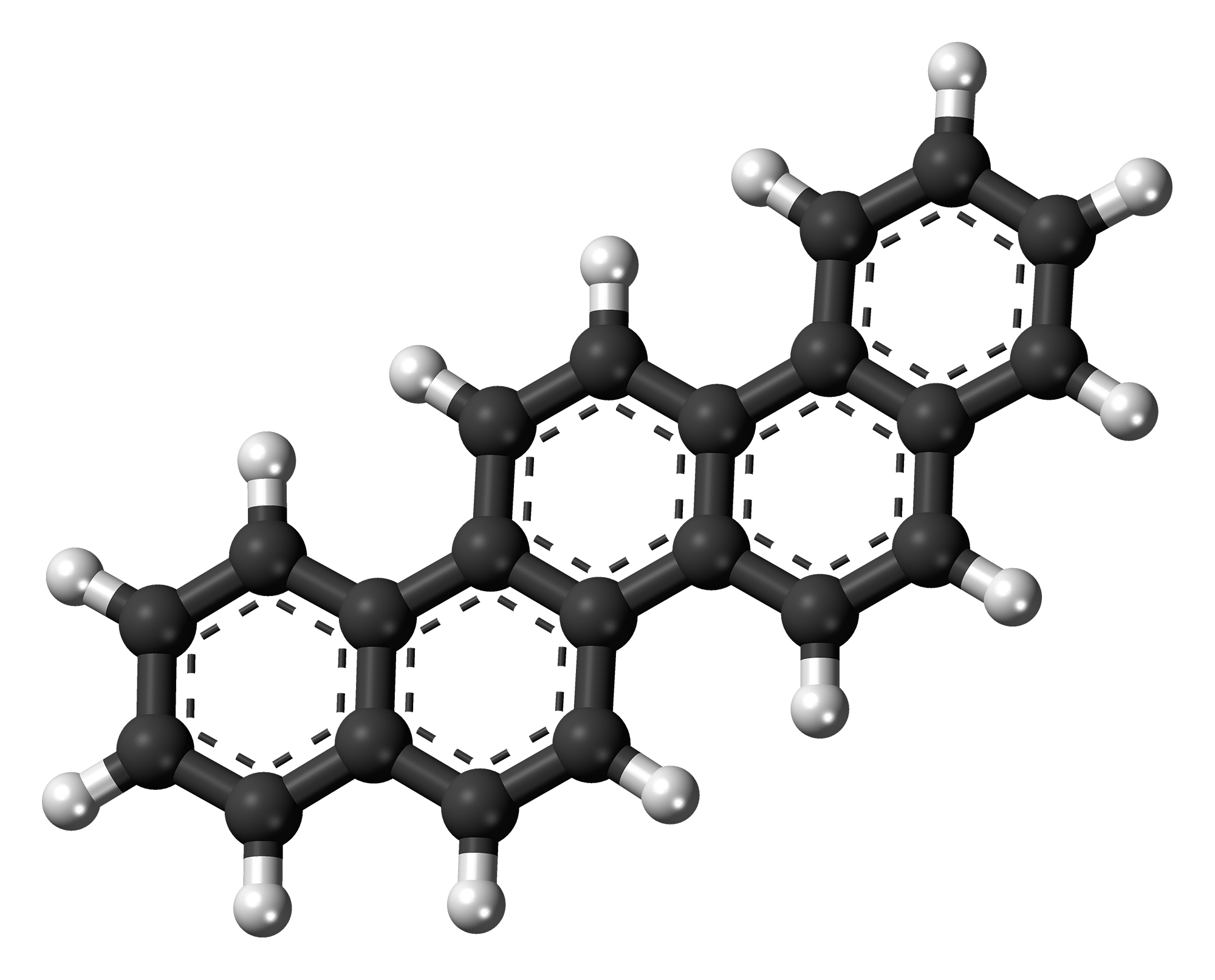

Names
- Preferred IUPAC name Picene
- Other names Dibenzo[a,i]phenanthrene; 3,4-Benzchrysene β,β-Binaphthylene ethene

Identifiers
CAS Number	213-46-7
3D model (JSmol)	Interactive image
Beilstein Reference	1912414
ChEBI	CHEBI:33090
ChemSpider	8808
ECHA InfoCard	100.005.381
KEGG	C19500
PubChem CID	9162
UNII	F70R8ZBR7T
CompTox Dashboard (EPA)	DTXSID8073895
- InChI: InChI=1S/C22H14/c1-3-7-17-15(5-1)9-11-21-19(17)13-14-20-18-8-4-2-6-16(18)10-12-22(20)21/h1-14H Key: GBROPGWFBFCKAG-UHFFFAOYSA-N; InChI=1/C22H14/c1-3-7-17-15(5-1)9-11-21-19(17)13-14-20-18-8-4-2-6-16(18)10-12-22(20)21/h1-14H Key: GBROPGWFBFCKAG-UHFFFAOYAN
- SMILES: c5c3c2ccc1ccccc1c2ccc3c4ccccc4c5

Properties
Chemical formula	C_{22}H_{14}
Molar mass	278.33 g/mol
Density	? g/cm^{3}
Melting point	366 to 367 °C (691 to 693 °F; 639 to 640 K)
Boiling point	518 to 520 °C (964 to 968 °F; 791 to 793 K)

Hazards
- GHS labelling
Pictograms	(GHS08: Health hazard)
Signal word	Warning
Hazard statements	H371
Precautionary statements	P260, P264, P270, P309+P311, P405, P501
- Except where otherwise noted, data are given for materials in their standard state (at 25 °C [77 °F], 100 kPa). verify (what is ?) Infobox references

Picene is a hydrocarbon found in the pitchy residue obtained in the distillation of peat tar and of petroleum. This is distilled to dryness and the distillate repeatedly recrystallized from cymene. It may be synthetically prepared by the action of anhydrous aluminium chloride on a mixture of naphthalene and 1,2-dibromoethane, or by distilling a-dinaphthostilbene. It crystallizes in large colorless plates which possess a blue fluorescence. It is soluble in concentrated sulfuric acid with a green color. Chromic acid in glacial acetic acid solution oxidizes it to picene-quinone, picene-quinone carboxylic acid, and finally to phthalic acid.

When intercalated with potassium or rubidium and cooled to below 18 K, picene has been reported to exhibit superconductive properties. However, due to the apparent inability to reproduce this work, the superconducting nature of doped picene has been met with heavy scepticism.

Picene is also a major constituent of the hydrocarbon mineral idrialite.

== See also ==
- Olympicene, which has the same number of rings linked in a different way
