= Humboldtine =

Oxalate mineral

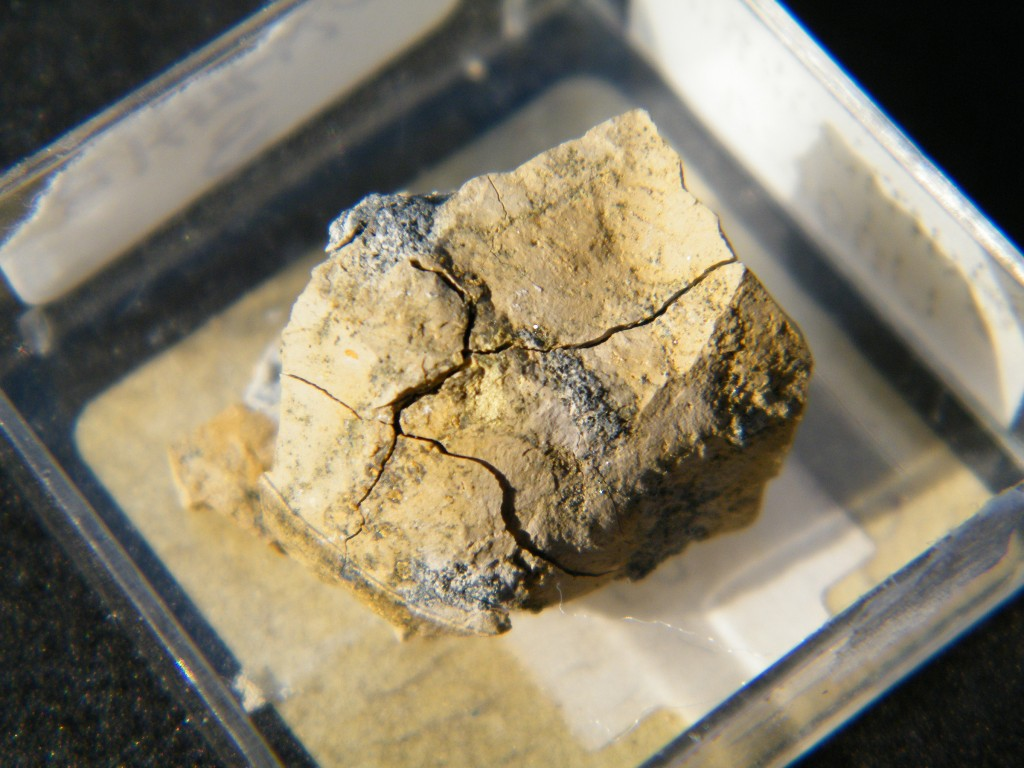

General
- Category: Organic minerals
- Formula: FeC_{2}O_{4}·2H_{2}O
- IMA symbol: Hbd
- Crystal system: Monoclinic

Identification
- Color: Yellow to amber-yellow
- Cleavage: Perfect on {110}, imperfect on {100} and {010}
- Mohs scale hardness: 1.5 to 2
- Luster: Resinous to dull
- Streak: Pale yellow
- Diaphaneity: Transparent to opaque
- Density: 2.28 g/cm^{3} (measured); 2.307 g/cm^{3} (calculated)
- Refractive index: n_{α} = 1.494 n_{β} = 1.561 n_{γ} = 1.692

Humboldtine is a rarely occurring organic mineral with the chemical composition FeC_{2}O_{4}•2H_{2}O and is therefore a water-containing iron(II) oxalate or the iron salt of oxalic acid.

Humboldtine crystallizes in the monoclinic crystal system, but only rarely develops well-formed, tabular to prismatic crystals with a resin-like sheen on the surfaces. It is mostly found in the form of botryoidal or fibrous to earthy aggregates and crusty coatings from dull yellow to brownish yellow or amber yellow in color. It can be transparent to opaque. It can form from hematite in oxalic acid.

With a Mohs hardness of 1.5 to 2, humboldtine is one of the softest minerals and can be scratched with a fingernail.

== Etymology and history ==
Humboldtine was first discovered by August Breithaupt in a weathered brown coal deposit near the municipality of Korozluky in Okres Most in the Czech Republic and described in 1821 by Mariano Eduardo de Rivero y Ustáriz (1798–1857), who named the mineral after the German naturalist Alexander von Humboldt.

The mineral was already known and characterized when the IMA was founded (1959). Accordingly, humboldtine is listed as an officially recognized mineral.

== Occurrence ==
The mineral is known to be found in 37 localities, including Germany, Greece, the U.K. and Canada.

In 2023, during the digitization of the archive of the Bavarian Environment Agency (LfU), a 75 year old letter from a coal mine owner written in 1949 was found. It mentioned that mineral was found in coal mine near the town of Schwandorf. Analysis of the mineral was done which confirmed the discovery. The discovery doubled the amount of Humboldtine known so far.

== Crystal structure ==
Humboldtine crystallizes monoclinically in the space group C2/c (space group no. 15) with the lattice parameters a = 12.011 Å; b = 5.557 Å; c = 9.920 Å and β = 128.53°, with four formula units per unit cell.

== Uses ==
Humboldtine is an important synthetic intermediate and also a key building block for the preparation of various advanced materials.
