= Calclacite =

Mineral and organic compound

General
- Category: Minerals
- Formula: Ca(CH_{3}COO)Cl·5H_{2}O
- IMA symbol: Calc
- Crystal system: Monoclinic

Identification
- Color: White
- Mohs scale hardness: 1.5
- Luster: Silky
- Diaphaneity: Translucent
- Specific gravity: 1.5
- Optical properties: Biaxial (+)
- Refractive index: n_{α} = 1.468 n_{β} = 1.484 n_{γ} = 1.515
- Birefringence: δ = 0.047
- 2V angle: Measured: 80°, Calculated: 74°
- Dispersion: Relatively feeble

Calclacite is a mineral and an organic compound. Its name references the components, which are calcium ions (Ca^{2+}), chloride (Cl^{−}) and acetate CH_{3}COO^{−}.

== Characteristics ==
Calclacite is an organic compound with chemical formula Ca(CH_{3}COO)Cl·5H_{2}O. It forms crystals in the monoclinic system, with silky hairlike efflorescences up to 4 cm long.

According to the Nickel–Strunz classification, calclacite is an organic acid salt and occurs with formicaite (calcium formate), acetamide, dashkovaite (magnesium acetate), paceite (calcium copper acetate) and hoganite (copper acetate). It is white and its hardness on the Mohs scale is 1.5.

== Formation ==
Calclacite is formed on samples of rocks, fossils, and on fragments of ceramics, by the action of acetic acid produced from the oak of the storage cabinets.
