= Markeyite =

Uranyl carbonate mineral

General
- Category: Carbonate mineral
- Formula: Ca_{9}(UO_{2})_{4}(CO_{3})_{13} · 28H_{2}O
- IMA symbol: Mk
- Crystal system: Orthorhombic
- Crystal class: mmm (2/m 2/m 2/m) - Dipyramidal

Identification

Markeyite, a uranyl carbonate mineral discovered in the Markey Mine in Utah, USA. A group led by Anthony R. Kampf, a mineralogist at the Natural History Museum of Los Angeles County, USA discovered its structure.

Cotype material for this mineral resides in the collections of the Natural History Museum, Los Angeles County, USA, and the Fersman Mineralogical Museum, Russian Academy of Sciences, Russia.

== Localities ==
USA: Markey mine, Red Canyon, White Canyon District, San Juan Co., Utah
