= Large number of rare events =

Statistical modeling methods

In statistics, large number of rare events (LNRE) modeling summarizes methods that allow improvements in frequency distribution estimation over the maximum likelihood estimation when "rare events are common".

It can be applied to problems in linguistics (see Zipf distribution), in various natural phenomena, in chemistry, in demography and in bibliography, amongst others.
