= Kratochvílite =

Rare organic mineral

General
- Category: Organic mineral
- Formula: C_{13}H_{10}
- IMA symbol: Ktc
- Strunz classification: 10.BA.25
- Crystal system: Orthorhombic
- Crystal class: Pyramidal (mmm)
- Space group: Orthorhombic; H-M symbol: (mm2); Space group: Pnam

Identification
- Color: White
- Streak: White
- Optical properties: Biaxial (+)
- Refractive index: n_{α} = 1.578 n_{β} = 1.663 n_{γ} = 1.919
- Birefringence: δ = 0.341

Kratochvilite is a rare organic mineral formed by combustion of coal or pyritic black shale deposits. It is a hydrocarbon with the formula of either C_{13}H_{10} or (C_{6}H_{4})_{2}CH_{2}. It is a polymorph of the aromatic hydrocarbon fluorene. It forms white, yellow to brown crystals in the orthorhombic system which occur often as a druzey encrustation. It has a specific gravity of 1.21 and a Mohs hardness of 1 to 2.

It was first described from the Nejedly mine in Bohemia, Czech Republic in 1937. It is named after Josef Kratotchvíl, Czech geologist.
