= Whewellite =

Mineral: Monohydrated calcium oxalate

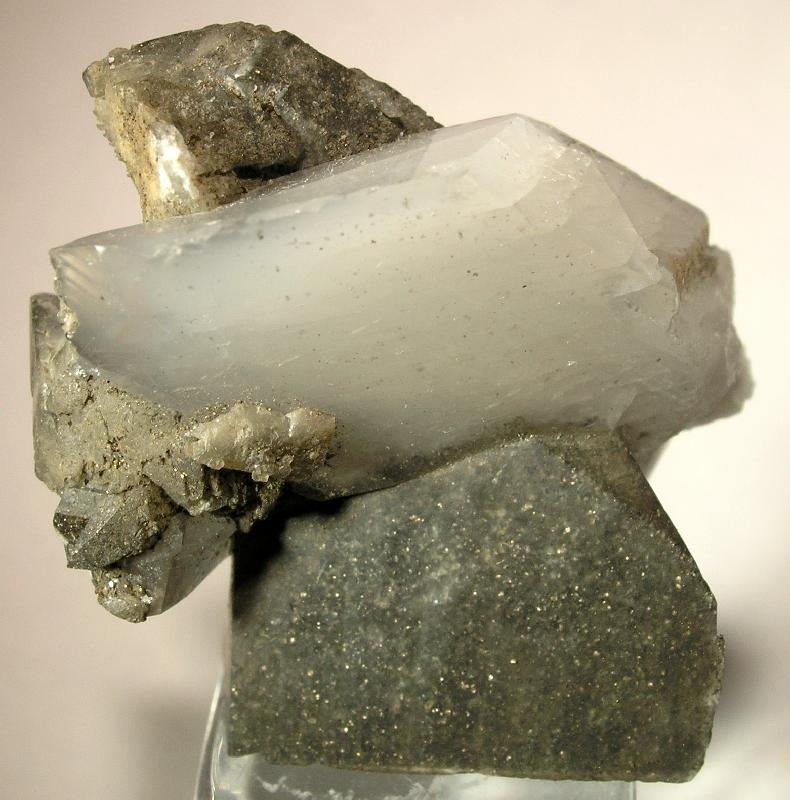
- A white Whewellite crystal from Schlema, Germany

General
- Category: Oxalate minerals
- Formula: CaC_{2}O_{4}·H_{2}O
- IMA symbol: Whe
- Strunz classification: 10.AB.45
- Crystal system: Monoclinic
- Crystal class: Prismatic (2/m) (same H-M symbol)
- Space group: P2_{1}/c (no. 14)

Identification
- Color: Colorless, yellowish, brownish
- Crystal habit: Equant or stout prismatic crystals
- Twinning: e {1̅01} twin plane
- Cleavage: {1̅01} good, {010} imperfect, {001} indistinct, {110} indistinct
- Fracture: Conchoidal
- Tenacity: Brittle
- Mohs scale hardness: 2.5–3
- Luster: Vitreous to pearly
- Diaphaneity: Transparent
- Specific gravity: 2.23
- Optical properties: Biaxial (+), colorless (transmitted light)
- Solubility: Insoluble in water, soluble in acids

Whewellite /ˈhjuːəlaɪt/ is a mineral, monohydrated calcium oxalate, formula Ca C_{2}O_{4}·H_{2}O. Because of its organic content it was thought to have an indirect biological origin; this hypothesis is supported by its presence in coal and sedimentary nodules. However, it has also been found in hydrothermal deposits where a biological source appears improbable. For this reason, it may be classed as a true mineral.

Whewellite, or at least crystalline calcium oxalate, does also arise from biological sources. Small crystals or flakes of it are sometimes found on the surfaces of some cacti, and kidney stones frequently have the same composition.

Whewellite was named after William Whewell (1794–1866), an English polymath, naturalist and scientist, professor of moral philosophy at Cambridge and inventor of the system of crystallographic indexing.

== Thermal decomposition ==
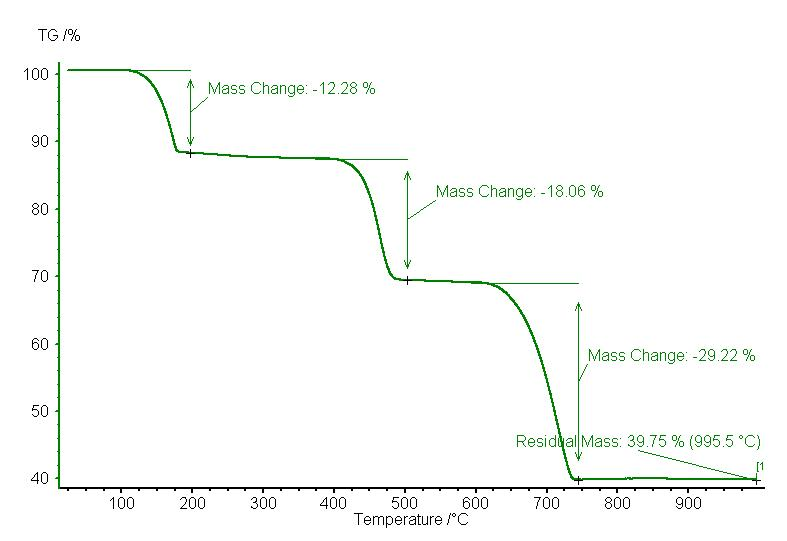
Whewellite (calcium oxalate monohydrate) thermogravimetric curve (TGA). The whewellite decomposes first to anhydrous calcium oxalate, then to calcium carbonate (losing carbon monoxide), and finally to calcium oxide (losing carbon dioxide).

Whewellite is used as a thermogravimetric analysis standard due to its well-known decomposition temperatures and products.

== See also ==
- Kidney stones
- List of minerals recognized by the International Mineralogical Association
- List of minerals named after people

== Bibliography ==
- Palache, P.; Berman H.; Frondel, C. (1960). "Dana's System of Mineralogy, Volume II: Halides, Nitrates, Borates, Carbonates, Sulfates, Phosphates, Arsenates, Tungstates, Molybdates, Etc. (Seventh Edition)" John Wiley and Sons, Inc., New York, pp. 1099–1101.
