= Arsenite mineral =

Type of mineral

Arsenite minerals are very rare oxygen-bearing arsenic minerals. Classical world localities where such minerals occur include the complex skarn manganese deposit at Långban (Sweden) and the polymetallic Tsumeb deposit (Namibia). The most often reported arsenite anion in minerals is the AsO^{3−}_{3} anion, present for example in reinerite Zn_{3}(AsO_{3})_{2}. Unique diarsenite anions occur in leiteite Zn[As_{2}O_{4}] and paulmooreite Pb[As_{2}O_{5}]. More complex arsenites include schneiderhöhnite Fe^{II}Fe^{III}_{3}[As_{5}O_{13}] and ludlockite PbFe^{III}_{4}As_{10}O_{22}.

== Nickel–Strunz classification -04- oxides ==
IMA-CNMNC proposes a new hierarchical scheme (Mills et al., 2009). This list uses it to modify the Classification of Nickel–Strunz (mindat.org, 10 ed, pending publication).

- Abbreviations:
  - "*" - IMA/CNMNC status: discredited.
  - "?" - IMA/CNMNC status: questionable/doubtful.
  - "REE" - Rare-earth element (Sc, Y, La, Ce, Pr, Nd, Pm, Sm, Eu, Gd, Tb, Dy, Ho, Er, Tm, Yb, Lu)
  - "PGE" - Platinum-group element (Ru, Rh, Pd, Os, Ir, Pt)
  - 03.C Aluminofluorides, 06 Borates, 08 Vanadates (04.H V^{[5,6]} Vanadates), 09 Silicates:
    - Neso: insular (from Greek νησος nēsos, island)
    - Soro: grouping (from Greek σωροῦ sōros, heap, mound (especially of corn))
    - Cyclo: ring
    - Ino: chain (from Greek ις [genitive: ινος inos], fibre)
    - Phyllo: sheet (from Greek φύλλον phyllon, leaf)
    - Tekto: three-dimensional framework
- Nickel–Strunz code scheme: NN.XY.##x
  - NN: Nickel–Strunz mineral class number
  - X: Nickel–Strunz mineral division letter
  - Y: Nickel–Strunz mineral family letter
  - ##x: Nickel–Strunz mineral/group number, x add-on letter

=== Class: arsenites ===
- 04.H V^{[5,6]} Vanadates
  - 04.HB Uranyl Sorovanadates: 05 Carnotite, 05 Margaritasite; 10 Sengierite; 15 Fritzscheite, 15 Curienite, 15 Francevillite; 20 Metavanuralite, 20 Vanuralite; 25 Metatyuyamunite, 25 Tyuyamunite; 30 Strelkinite, 35 Uvanite, 40 Rauvite
  - 04.HC [6]-Sorovanadates: 05 Magnesiopascoite, 05 Lasalite, 05 Pascoite; 10 Hummerite, 15 Sherwoodite
  - 04.HD Inovanadates: 05 Rossite, 10 Metarossite, 15 Munirite, 20 Metamunirite, 25 Dickthomssenite, 30 Ansermetite
  - 04.HE Phyllovanadates: 05 Melanovanadite, 10 Shcherbinaite; 15 Hewettite, 15 Metahewettite; 20 Bokite, 20 Bariandite, 20 Corvusite, 20 Fernandinite, 20 Straczekite; 25 Haggite, 30 Doloresite, 35 Duttonite, 40 Cavoite
  - 04.HF Tektovanadates: 05 Bannermanite
  - 04.HG Unclassified V oxides: 05 Fervanite, 10 Huemulite, 15 Vanalite, 20 Simplotite, 25 Vanoxite, 30 Navajoite, 35 Delrioite, 40 Metadelrioite, 45 Barnesite, 50 Hendersonite, 55 Grantsite, 60 Lenoblite, 65 Satpaevite
- 04.J Arsenites, Antimonites, Bismuthites, Sulfites
  - 04.JA Arsenites, antimonites, bismuthites; without additional anions, without H_{2}O: 05 Leiteite, 10 Reinerite, 15 Karibibite; 20 Schafarzikite, 20 Trippkeite, 20 Kusachiite; 25 Apuanite, 30 Versiliaite, 35 Schneiderhohnite, 40 Zimbabweite; 45 Ludlockite, 45 Ludlockite-(Pb)*; 50 Paulmooreite, 55 Stibivanite, 60 Chadwickite
  - 04.JB Arsenites, antimonites, bismuthites; with additional anions, without H_{2}O: 05 Fetiasite, 10 Manganarsite, 15 Magnussonite, 20 Armangite, 25 Nanlingite, 30 Asbecasite, 35 Stenhuggarite, 40 Trigonite, 45 Finnemanite, 50 Gebhardite; 55 Derbylite, 55 Graeserite, 55 Tomichite; 60 Hemloite, 65 Freedite, 70 Georgiadesite, 75 Ekatite
  - 04.JC Arsenites, antimonites, bismuthites; without additional anions, with H_{2}O: 05 Cafarsite, 10 Lazarenkoite, 15 Rouseite, 20 Vajdakite
  - 04.JD Arsenites, antimonites, bismuthites; with additional anions, with H_{2}O: 05 Nealite, 05 Nealite-(H_{2}O)*; 10 Seelite-1, 10 Seelite-2; 15 Tooeleite
  - 04.JE Sulfites: 05 Gravegliaite, 10 Hannebachite, 15 Orschallite, 20 Scotlandite
  - 04.JF Selenites without additional anions, without H_{2}O: 05 Molybdomenite
  - 04.JG Selenites with additional anions, without H_{2}O: Prewittite; 05 Parageorgbokiite, 05 Georgbokiite; 10 Chloromenite, 15 Sofiite, 20 Ilinskite, 25 Francisite, 30 Derriksite, 35 Burnsite, 40 Allochalcoselite
  - 04.JH Selenites without additional anions, with H_{2}O: 05 Chalcomenite; 10 Ahlfeldite, 10 Clinochalcomenite, 10 Cobaltomenite; 15 Mandarinoite, 20 Orlandiite, 25 Larisaite
  - 04.JJ Selenites with additional anions, with H_{2}O: 05 Marthozite, 10 Guilleminite, 15 Piretite, 20 Demesmaekerite, 25 Haynesite
  - 04.JK Tellurites without additional anions, without H_{2}O: 05 Walfordite, 05 Winstanleyite, 10 Spiroffite, 10 Zincospiroffite, 15 Balyakinite, 20 Rajite, 25 Carlfriesite, 30 Denningite, 35 Chekhovichite, 40 Smirnite, 45 Choloalite, 50 Fairbankite, 55 Plumbotellurite, 60 Magnolite, 65 Moctezumite, 70 Schmitterite, 75 Cliffordite
  - 04.JL Tellurites with additional anions, without H_{2}O: 05 Rodalquilarite, 10 Mackayite, 15 Mroseite, 20 Pingguite, 25 Tlapallite, 30 Girdite
  - 04.JM Tellurites without additional anions, with H_{2}O: 05 Keystoneite, 05 Kinichilite, 05 Zemannite, 10 Emmonsite, 15 Graemite, 20 Teineite
  - 04.JN Tellurites with additional anions, with H_{2}O: 05 Sonoraite, 10 Poughite; 15 Cesbronite, 15 Cesbronite-x; 20 Eztlite, 25 Oboyerite, 30 Juabite
- 04.K Iodates
  - 04.KA Iodates without additional anions, without H_{2}O: 05 Lautarite
  - 04.KB Iodates with additional anions, without H_{2}O: 05 Salesite, 10 Schwartzembergite, 15 Seeligerite
  - 04.KC Iodates without additional anions, with H_{2}O: 05 Bellingerite, 10 Bruggenite
  - 04.KD Iodates with additional anions, with H_{2}O: 05 Dietzeite, 10 George-ericksenite
- 04.X Unclassified Strunz Oxides (Arsenites, antimonites, bismuthites, sulfites, selenites, tellurites, iodates)
  - 04.XX Unknown: 00 Methane hydrate-I, 00 Methane hydrate-II, 00 Methane hydrate-H
