= Moctezumite =

Type of oxide mineral

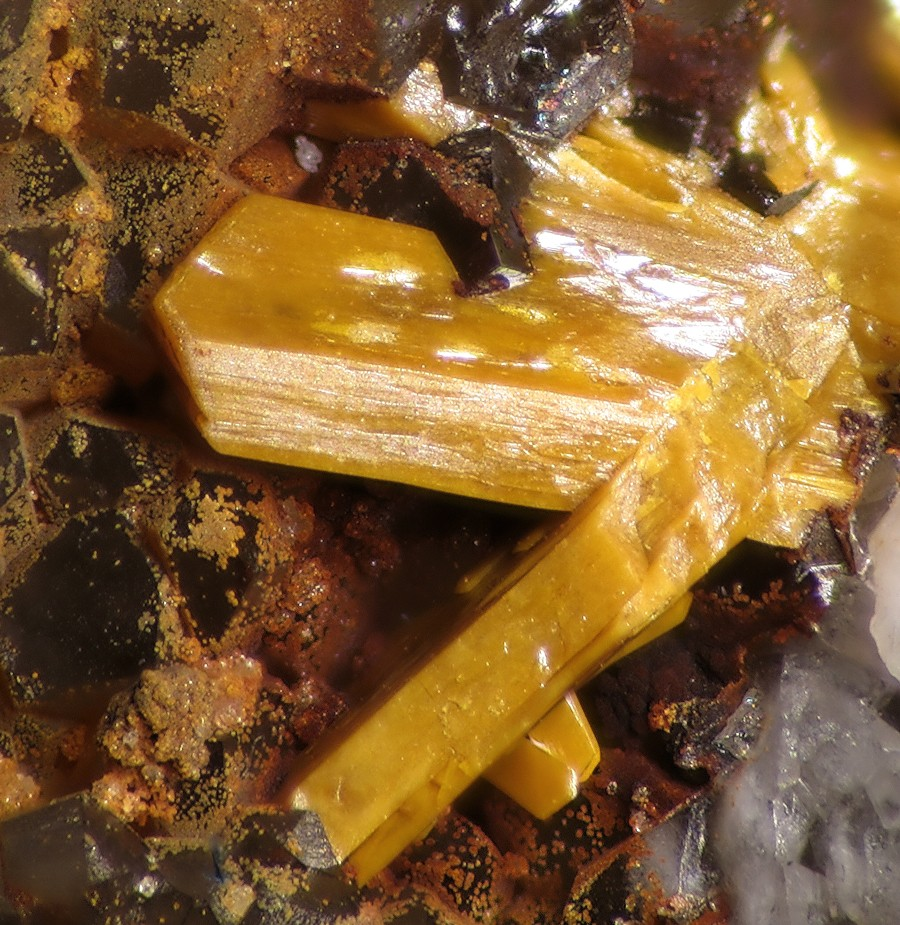
- Moctezumite crystals from the Bambolla mine in Moctezuma, Mexico

General
- Category: Oxide mineral
- Formula: Pb(UO_{2})(Te^{4+}O_{3})_{2}
- IMA symbol: Moc
- IMA status: Approved
- Crystal system: Monoclinic
- Crystal class: 04.JK.65 (Strunz)
- Space group: P2_{1}/b

Identification
- Color: Bright orange, brownish orange to dark orange
- Cleavage: 100
- Mohs scale hardness: 3
- Luster: Dull
- Specific gravity: 5.73
- Optical properties: Biaxial

Moctezumite is a lead-uranyl tellurite with the chemical formula Pb(UO_{2})(Te^{4+}O_{3})_{2} and a monoclinic crystal system. It was first described in 1965 after being taken from a mineral deposit in a mine within the municipality of Moctezuma, Sonora, being named after the town where it was found.

== Occurrence ==
Moctezumite is a rare type of secondary mineral that is formed in the oxidized zones of hydrothermal deposits where gold and tellurium occur. The mineral was first harvested in 1937 from the 'La Bambolla' mine in the municipality of Moctezuma, Sonora, where, after investigations from Royal Ontario Museum, it was first described in 1965.

== Description ==
Moctezumite ranges in color from a bright orange to a dark or brownish orange. It has small, bladed crystals with dull, curved faces and a maximum observed size of 3mm long by 1mm wide, by 0.2 mm thick. These crystals are semitransparent and biaxial, with a monoclinic symmetry.

Moctezumite is closely associated with Schmitterite, burckhardtite, zemannite, emmonsite, pyrite, barite, and limonite, and is structurally similar to the aformentioned Schmitterite.

== Uses ==
Moctezumite can be dissolved in diluted hydrochloric acid or sodium hydroxide, resulting a solution containing gold, lead, and tellurium.
