= Arsenate reductase =

Arsenate reductase may refer to:

- Arsenate reductase (azurin)
- Arsenate reductase (cytochrome c)
- Arsenate reductase (donor)
- Arsenate reductase (glutaredoxin)
