= Walfordite =

Tellurite mineral

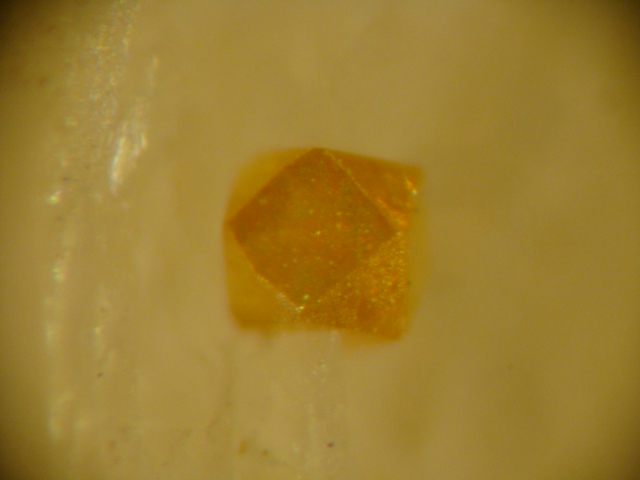
- Walfordite from Tambo Mine, Elqui Province, Chile

General
- Category: Tellurite minerals
- Formula: Fe^{3+},Te^{6+}Te^{4+}_{3}O_{8}
- IMA symbol: wfd
- Strunz classification: 4.JK.05
- Crystal system: Isometric
- Space group: I2, Ia3
- Unit cell: a = 11.011 Å ; Z = 8

Identification
- Colour: Orange
- Crystal habit: Microscopic cubic crystals
- Cleavage: None
- Tenacity: Brittle
- Luster: Adamantine
- Streak: Orange-yellow
- Diaphaneity: Opaque
- Specific gravity: 5.841 (calculated)
- Optical properties: Isotropic
- Refractive index: n = 2.23

Walfordite is a very rare tellurite mineral that was discovered in Chile in 1999. The mineral is described as orange with orange-yellow streak, and is determined to have a chemical formula of Fe^{3+},Te^{6+}Te^{4+}_{3}O_{8} with minor titanium and magnesium substitution resulting in an approximate empirical formula of (Fe^{3+},Te^{6+},Ti^{4+},Mg)(Te^{4+})_{3}O_{8}.

== Occurrence ==
The only reported occurrence is in the Wendy open pit, El Indio-Tambo mining district of the Coquimbo Region, northern Chile where it occurs in oxidized breccia associated with a tellurium-bearing gold deposit. Associated minerals include: alunite, rodalquilarite, native gold, emmonsite, jarosite and pyrite. The mineral was named for mine geologist Phillip Walford (1945— ) who first noted the mineral.

== See also ==
- El Indio Gold Belt. Tambo is adjacent to the El Indio mine. Both are now closed.
