= Francevillite =

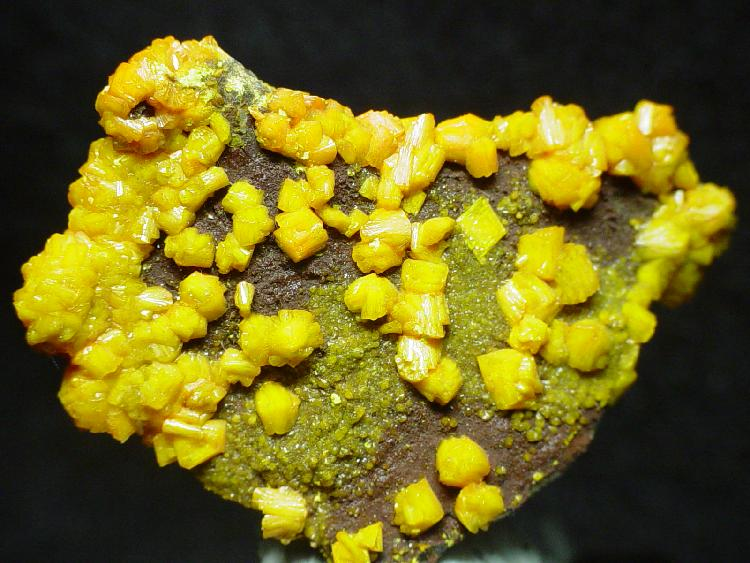
- Yellow crystals of francevillite on matrix with small mounanaite crystals (specimen size, 4 x 3.5 x 1 cm)

General
- Category: Vanadate mineral
- Formula: (Ba,Pb)(UO_{2})_{2}V_{2}O_{8}·5(H_{2}O)
- IMA symbol: Fvl
- Strunz classification: 4.HB.15
- Dana classification: 40.02a.27.01
- Crystal system: Orthorhombic
- Crystal class: Dipyramidal (mmm); H-M symbol: (2/m 2/m 2/m)
- Space group: Pcan
- Unit cell: a = 10.41, b = 8.51 c = 16.76 [Å]; Z = 4

Identification
- Color: Lemon-yellow, yellow-orange, orange, greenish yellow; green, brown
- Crystal habit: Aggregates and incrustations of crystals, also massive, in veinlets and as impregnations
- Cleavage: On {001}, perfect
- Mohs scale hardness: 3
- Luster: Adamantine - pearly
- Streak: Light yellow
- Diaphaneity: Semitransparent
- Specific gravity: 4.55
- Optical properties: Biaxial (-)
- Refractive index: n_{α} = 1.750 - 1.785 n_{β} = 1.910 - 1.952 n_{γ} = 1.945 - 2.002
- Birefringence: δ = 0.195 - 0.217
- Pleochroism: X = colorless; Y = Z = yellow
- 2V angle: Measured: 52°, Calculated: 46° to 52°
- Other characteristics: Radioactive

Francevillite is a uranyl-group vanadate mineral in the tyuyamunite series. Its chemical formula is (Ba,Pb)(UO_{2})_{2}V_{2}O_{8}·5(H_{2}O). Francevillite is a strongly radioactive mineral. It is typically orange, yellow or brownish yellow. It forms a series with curienite.

== Occurrence ==
Francevillite occurs in the oxidized zone of lead-bearing uranium–vanadium deposits. Francevillite was first described in 1957 for an occurrence in its type locality of the idle Mounana uranium mine, near Franceville, Haut-Ogooué, Gabon and was named for the city.

At its type locality it is associated with curienite (a closely related uranyl vanadate), chervetite (a lead vanadate), and mounanaite (another lead vanadate). At other localities, francevillite is associated with duttonite, vanuralite, mottramite, carnotite, dewindtite, torbernite, uranopilite, johannite and kasolite.

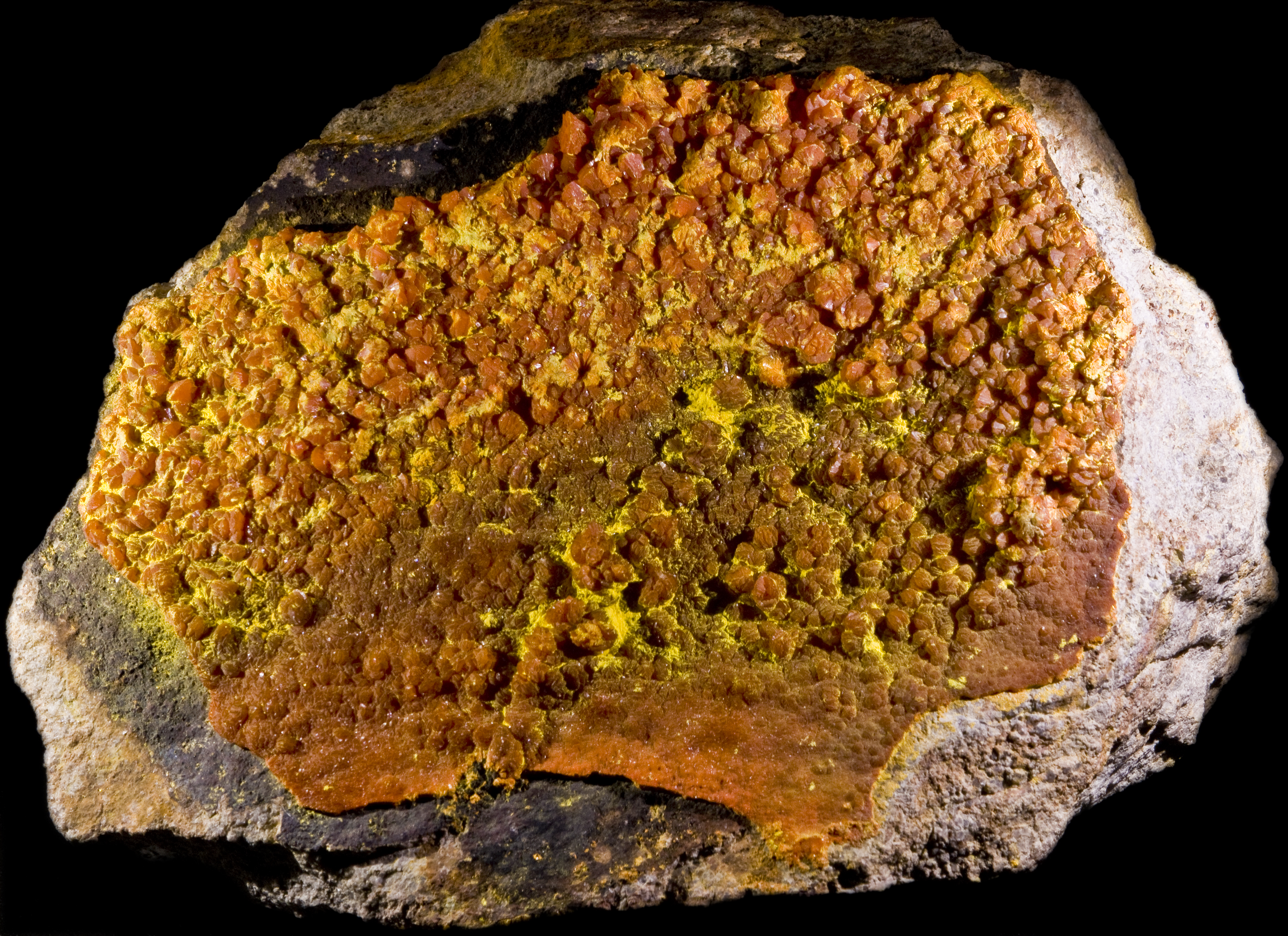
Yellow curienite on bright orange francevillite, in a specimen from their mutual type locality, the Mounana uranium mine, near Franceville. Specimen size: 23x17cm.

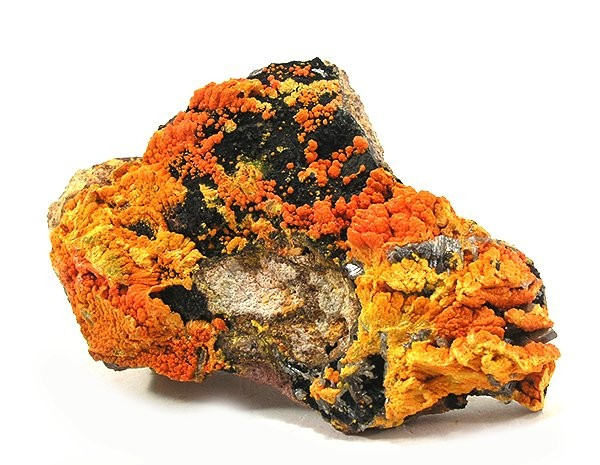
Francevillite (orange) with Curienite (yellow) and Chervetite, Mounana Mine, Franceville, Haut-Ogooué Province, Gabon. Overall size 8.7 x 6.1 x 2.1 cm.
