= Arsenite oxidase =

Arsenite oxidase may refer to:

- Arsenate reductase (cytochrome c)
- Arsenate reductase (azurin)
