= Demesmaekerite =

Uranium selenite mineral

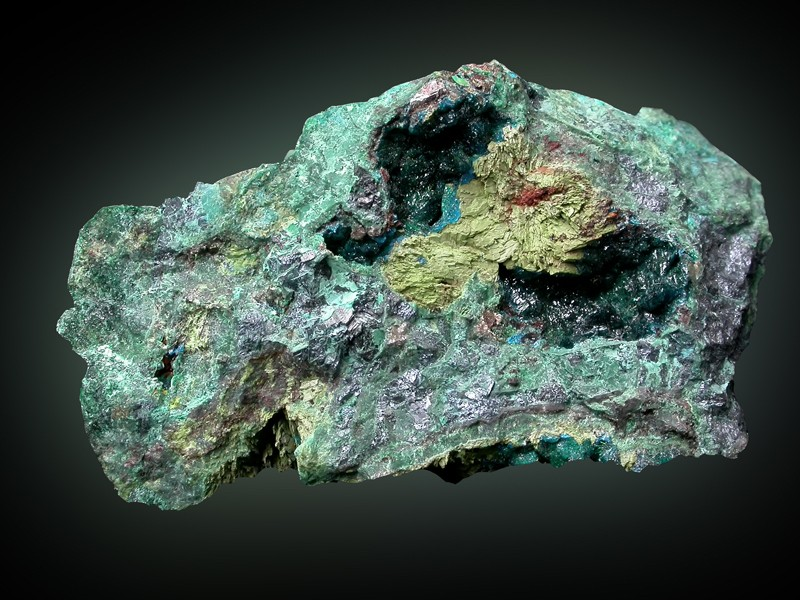
- A specimen of demesmaekerite associated with blue chalcomenite crystals

General
- Category: Oxide mineral
- Formula: Pb_{2}Cu_{5}(UO_{2})_{2}(SeO_{3})_{6}(OH)_{6}·2H_{2}O
- IMA symbol: Dmm
- Strunz classification: 4.JJ.20
- Dana classification: 34.07.06.01
- Crystal system: Triclinic
- Crystal class: Pinacoidal (1̅) (same H-M symbol)
- Space group: P1̅
- Unit cell: a = 11.94 Å, b = 10.02 Å, c = 5.62 Å; α = 90°, β = 100°, γ = 91.91°

Identification
- Formula mass: 2,172.01 gm
- Color: Green to olive green – turns brownish on dehydration
- Crystal habit: Elongated, striated, typically in radial aggregates
- Cleavage: None
- Mohs scale hardness: 3–4
- Diaphaneity: Translucent, opaque
- Specific gravity: 5.28
- Density: Measured 5.28(4), calculated 5.45
- Optical properties: Biaxial (+)
- Refractive index: n_{α} = 1.835 n_{γ} = 1.910
- Pleochroism: Visible
- Dispersion: Strong
- Other characteristics: Radioactive

Demesmaekerite is a rare uranium selenite mineral with the chemical formula: Pb_{2}Cu_{5}(UO_{2})_{2}(SeO_{3})_{6}(OH)_{6}·2H_{2}O.

It is named after the Belgian mineralogist Gaston Demesmaeker, who worked at the Musonoi Mine in Katanga. It is a secondary mineral which contains lead, copper and selenium, it is a bottle green to brown/yellow color, its crystal habit varies depending on where it is found. It has pleochroic attributes, which means depending on which axis it is seen, the gem displays different colors, which is an optical phenomenon. On the X axis it displays a yellow-green color, and on the Y the gem is seen in a brown color. Demesmaekerite has a very strong radioactivity, 1,629,108.74, measured in GRapi (Gamma Ray American Petroleum Institute Units). It is mostly made out of oxygen (22.1%), uranium (21.92%) which causes its irradiative attributes, selenium (21.81%), lead (19.08%) which is a poisonous chemical element and copper (14.63%), but also contains hydrogen (0.46%).

It can be found associated with other rare selenium-bearing uranium ores, such as haynesite, guilleminite, marthozite and piretite.
