= Zimbabweite =

Oxide mineral

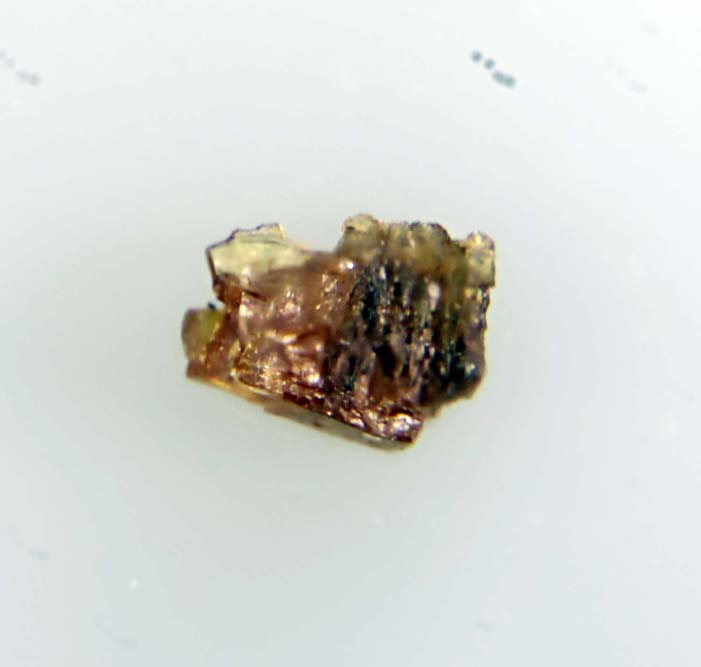
- Zimbabweite found at its only known locality worldwide

General
- Category: Oxide minerals
- Formula: (Na,K)_{2}PbAs_{4}(Nb,Ta,Ti)_{4}O_{18}
- IMA symbol: Zbb
- Strunz classification: 4.JA.40
- Crystal system: Orthorhombic
- Crystal class: Dipyramidal (mmm); H-M symbol: (2/m 2/m 2/m)
- Space group: Ccmb
- Unit cell: a = 12.23 Å, b = 15.29 Å c = 8.66 Å, Z = 4

Identification
- Color: Yellow, yellow-brown
- Luster: Adamantine

Zimbabweite is a yellow brown mineral with orthorhombic crystal habit and a hardness of 5, with formula (Na,K)_{2}PbAs_{4}(Nb,Ta,Ti)_{4}O_{18}. It is generally classed as an arsenite but is notable for also containing niobium and tantalum. It was discovered in 1986 in kaolinized pegmatite, i.e. weathered to clay, in Zimbabwe.
