= El Indio Gold Belt =

Mineral-rich region across the Argentina–Chile border

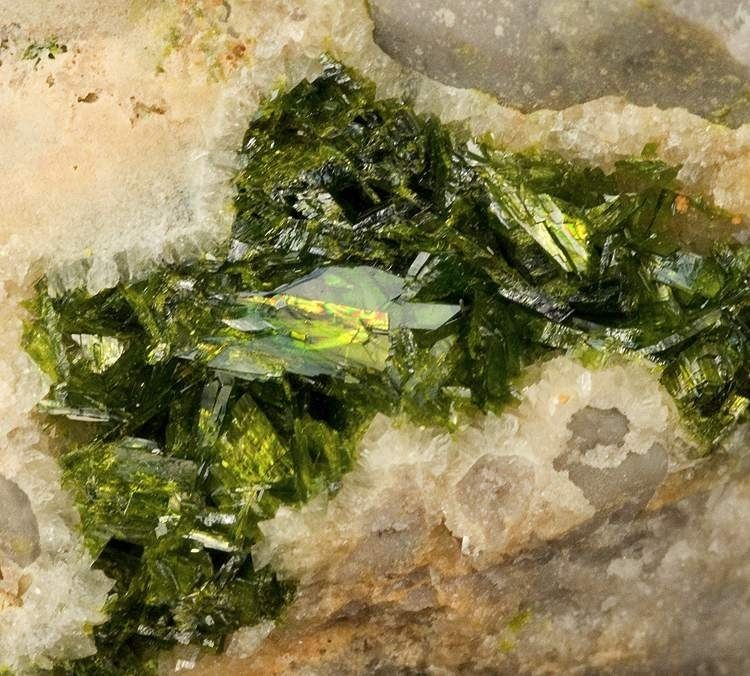
Rodalquilarite, a rare iron tellurite chloride mineral from the Wendy open pit, Tambo Mine in Chile

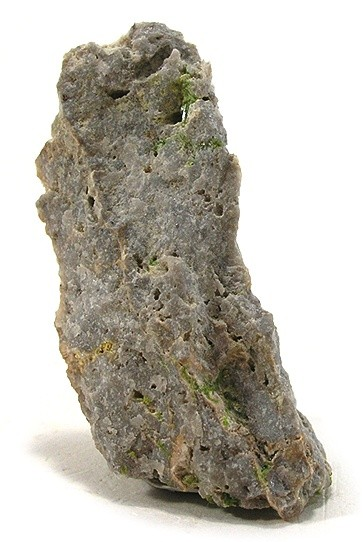
Specimen from the Tambo mine with gold-alunite-rodalquilarite mineralization

The El Indio Gold Belt is a mineral-rich region spanning the border between Chile and Argentina that contains large quantities of gold, silver and copper. On both sides of the border the belt is located within the Andes. The El Indio mine within the district was the first modern mine in Chile to produce gold as its main product. In Chile the main precious metal containing mineral is enargite. The El Indio belt is bordered in the north by another gold-silver mining district known as the Frontera District. Rodalquilarite, alunite and poughite are some of the minerals present in the area. The deposits of the belt formed during the Late Miocene period.

The world's largest gold mining company, Barrick Gold, used to be the only foreign company heavily invested in the region however more recently a number of other companies have begun exploratory activity.

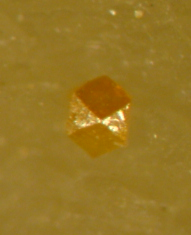
Walfordite in alunite, individual microscopic crystal, Tambo mine, El Indio area. Tambo is the type area, and only known occurrence, for this rare tellurite mineral.

Active, closed and proposed mines in the El Indio Gold Belt in the regions of Coquimbo and Atacama.

== History ==
In Chile the district was first officially recognized in 1975 and operated in 1979. El Indio, the main mine in the area was discovered in 1975 by St. Joe Minerals, and placed in production in 1981, with initial production of bonanza gold from quartz-gold veins: 500, 000 MT @ 121 g/MT Au. Total production plus reserves was quoted (circa 2000) as 23.2 mt @ 6.6 g/t Au, 50 g/t Ag, 4% Cu. Individual drill samples in the bonanza for assay were so rich, visible gold could be easily panned from the assay pulps.

El Indio, which was purchased by Barrick Chile in 1994, is associated with a hydrothermal system within a volcanic caldera. Chile's portion of the belt consisted of three major mines; El Indio, Pascua Lama, and Tambo (since 1995). Gold reserves in the belt located within Argentina may be as high as 35 million ounces.

One of the largest mines in the belt, the Tambo Mine operated by Barrick Gold, closed in 2001 after attempts by the company to replace reserves proved unsuccessful. The mine, with a design capacity of 200,000 ounces a year was depleted of gold by 1999–2001. The El Indio mine closed in 2002, and the site has since been reclaimed.

== Companies with interests in the region ==
- Malbex (TSX: MBG) - nano cap company that operates 3 projects 2 near the Valadero and Pascua-Lama mines (Arroyo de Los Amarillos and Los Despoblados). The largest is the Del Carmen gold-silver project on the Argentine side of the belt (south end).
- Barrick Gold - Owns the Valadero and Pascua Lama deposits (over 17.5 million ounces of gold at Pascua Lama). It is also engaged in exploration activity in Chile. Has operated in the region since 1994.
- Silver Wheaton - has an agreement with Barrick Gold to purchase 25% of the silver mined at Pascua Lama between 2013 and 2017.
- ATW Gold Corp. (TSX: ATW2) - Australian mining company that oversees the Amarillo project in San Juan Province (Argentina).
- Yamana Gold - Explores east of the Los Amarillos concessions. Yamana signed 4 gold exploration agreements in Region de Coquimbo, Chile in 1996 (13,200 hectares of land).
- MegaMoly Inc. (TSX: MGYFF:US) - Has interests through the Amarillo property in San Juan, Argentina (7,200 hectares on the Argentine side of the Andes). Primarily in the business of molybdenum and tungsten exploration (in Slovakia), it is part of Terreno Resources Corp.
- NGEx Resources Inc. (TSX: NGQ) - Small cap (over $100 million) Vancouver based company with copper containing assets in central Chile. Owns 100% of Colmillos and Andrea copper projects.
- Royal Gold - Royalty company with a 3% to 5% claim on Barrick Gold's Pascua Lama mine.
