= Asbecasite =

Mineral

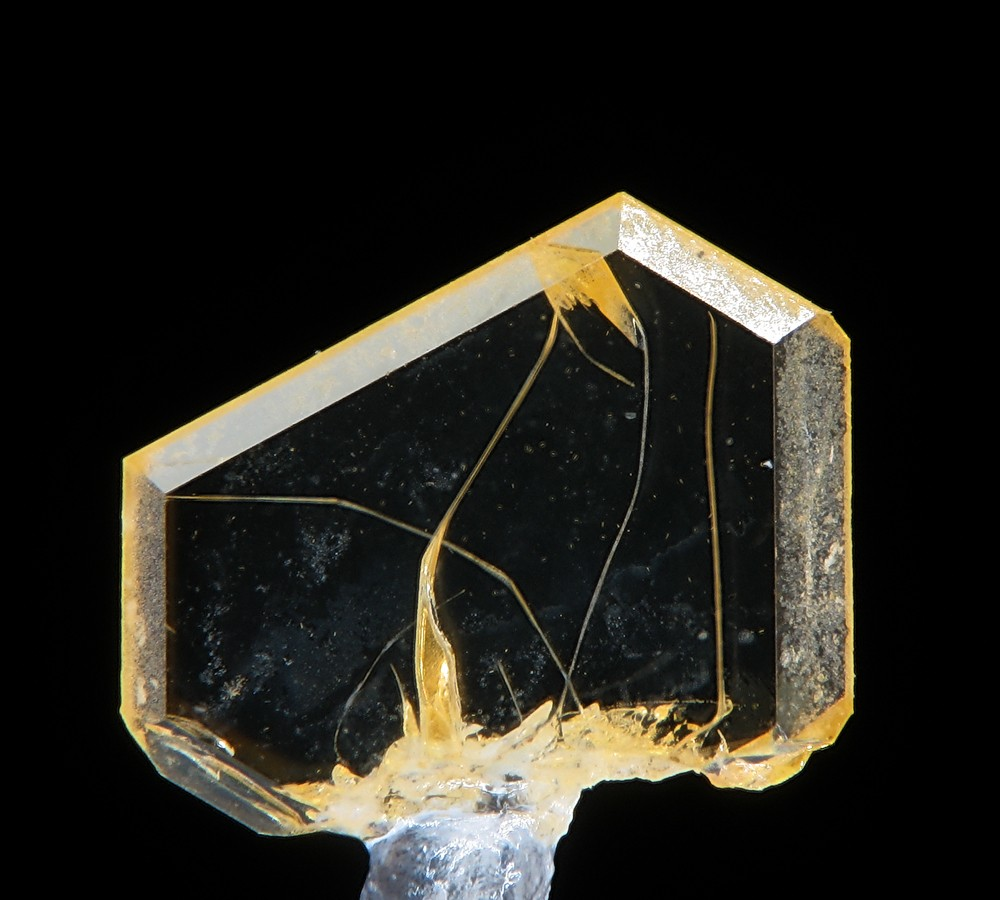
- Asbecasite found at its type locality

General
- Category: Minerals
- Formula: Ca_{3}(Ti,Sn^{4+})Be_{2}<(AsO_{3})_{6}(SiO_{4})_{2}
- IMA status: Approved
- Strunz classification: 4.JB.30
- Crystal system: Trigonal

Identification
- Color: Yellow, pale yellow
- Cleavage: Perfect; Rhombohedral {1011}
- Tenacity: Brittle
- Mohs scale hardness: 6½ - 7
- Luster: Vitreous, Sub-Vitreous
- Streak: Pale yellow

Asbecasite (Named by S. Graeser in 1966 for the elements in its composition: As, Be, Ca, Si) is a calcium titanium beryllium arsenite silicate mineral with the chemical formula Ca_{3}(Ti,Sn^{4+})Be_{2}(AsO_{3})_{6}(SiO_{4})_{2}. Its type locality is the Binn valley in Switzerland.
