= Arsenite methyltransferase =

Identifiers
- EC no.: 2.1.1.137
- CAS no.: 167140-41-2

Databases
- IntEnz: IntEnz view
- BRENDA: BRENDA entry
- ExPASy: NiceZyme view
- KEGG: KEGG entry
- MetaCyc: metabolic pathway
- PRIAM: profile
- PDB structures: RCSB PDB PDBe PDBsum
Search
- PMC: articles
- PubMed: articles
- NCBI: proteins

Arsenite methyltransferase (EC 2.1.1.137, S-adenosyl-L-methionine:arsenic(III) methyltransferase, S-adenosyl-L-methionine:methylarsonite As-methyltransferase, methylarsonite methyltransferase) is an enzyme with systematic name S-adenosyl-L-methionine:arsenite As-methyltransferase. This enzyme catalyses the following chemical reaction

(1) S-adenosyl-L-methionine + arsenite $\rightleftharpoons$ S-adenosyl-L-homocysteine + methylarsonate
(2) S-adenosyl-L-methionine + methylarsonite $\rightleftharpoons$ S-adenosyl-L-homocysteine + dimethylarsinate

An enzyme of the biotransformation pathway that forms dimethylarsinate from inorganic arsenite and arsenate.
