= Tellurite (disambiguation) =

For the similarly named Star Trek race, see Tellarite.

Tellurite can may refer to:

- Tellurite (mineral), a mineral form of tellurium dioxide
- Tellurite (ion), a tellurium containing anion
