= Josef Zemann =

Austrian mineralogist and geologist (1923–2022)

- Born: 25 May 1923; Vienna, Austria
- Died: 16 October 2022 (aged 99)
- Education: University of Vienna
- Scientific career
- Workplaces: University of Göttingen
- Doctoral advisor: Felix Machatschki

Josef Zemann (25 May 1923 – 16 October 2022) was an Austrian mineralogist and geologist.

== Life and work ==
Zemann was born on 25 May 1923 in Vienna. He studied mineralogy at the University of Vienna where he received his PhD for work with Felix Machatschki in 1946. Zemann worked with Martin J. Buerger at the Massachusetts Institute of Technology in 1951 and 1952. He became director of the Institute of Mineralogy and Crystallography of the University of Göttingen. From 1967 until his retirement in 1989 he was head of the Institute of Mineralogy and Crystallography of the University of Vienna.

Zemann died on 16 October 2022, at the age of 99.

== Honours ==
The mineral Zemannite Mg_{0.5}ZnFe^{3+}[TeO_{3}]_{3} • 4.5 H_{2}O was named after him in the 1960s.
