= Derriksite =

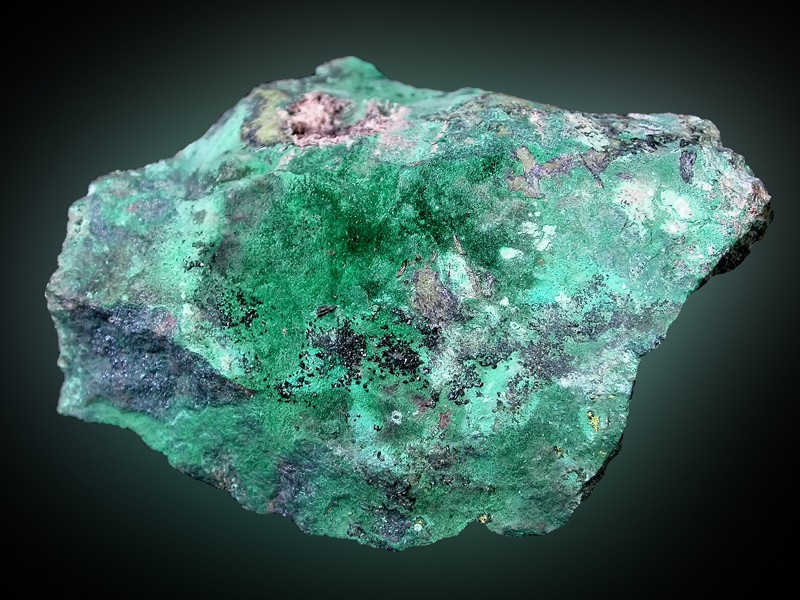
- Crystals of copper-uranium-selenite derriksite (bottle green) on a bed of malachite, the matrix is selenium-rich digenite

General
- Category: Oxide minerals
- Formula: Cu_{4}(UO_{2})(SeO_{3})_{2}(OH)_{6}•H_{2}O
- IMA symbol: Drk
- Strunz classification: 4.JG.30
- Crystal system: Orthorhombic
- Crystal class: Pyramidal (mm2); H-M symbol: (mm2)
- Space group: Pn2_{1}m

Identification
- Colour: Bottle green, green
- Cleavage: {???} perfect, {010} good
- Diaphaneity: Translucent
- Specific gravity: 4.72
- Other characteristics: Radioactive

Derriksite is a very rare uranium mineral with the chemical formula Cu_{4}(UO_{2})(SeO_{3})_{2}(OH)_{6}•H_{2}O. It is a secondary mineral that contains copper, uranium and the rarer selenium. It is a bright green to duller bottle green colour. Its crystal habit is acicular, it is most likely to be found along with the uranyl selenium mineral demesmaekerite, but derriksite is much rarer than demesmaekerite. It is named after Jean Marie Francois Joseph Derriks (1912–1992), geologist and administrator of the Union Minière du Haut Katanga (UMHK). It has a Mohs hardness of about 2.
