= Seeligerite =

Lead chloride iodate mineral

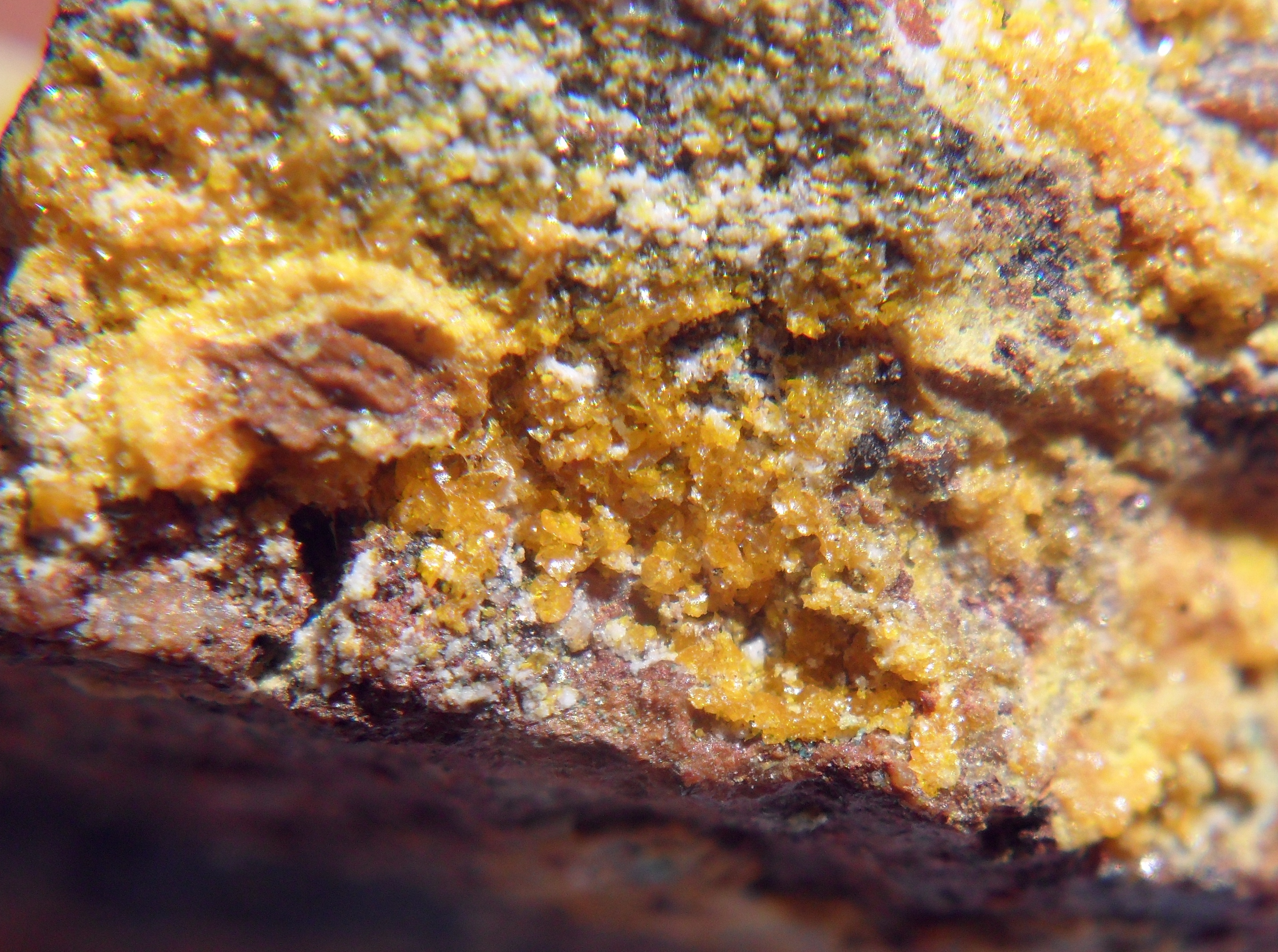
- Seeligerite crystals, from Sierra Gorda, Antofagasta Region, Chile.

General
- Category: Iodate minerals
- Formula: Pb_{3}Cl_{3}(IO_{3})O
- IMA symbol: Sli
- Strunz classification: 4.KB.15
- Crystal system: Orthorhombic
- Crystal class: Disphenoidal (222); H-M symbol: (2 2 2)
- Space group: C222_{1}

Identification

Seeligerite is a rare complex lead chloride iodate mineral with formula: Pb_{3}Cl_{3}(IO_{3})O. It is a yellow mineral crystallizing in the orthorhombic system. It has perfect to good cleavage in two directions and a quite high specific gravity of 6.83 due to the lead content. It is translucent to transparent with refractive indices of n_{α}=2.120 n_{β}=2.320 n_{γ}=2.320.

It was first reported in 1971 from the Casucha Mine, Sierra Gorda, Antofagasta Region, Chile.
