= Reinerite =

Rare arsenite (arsenate(III)) mineral

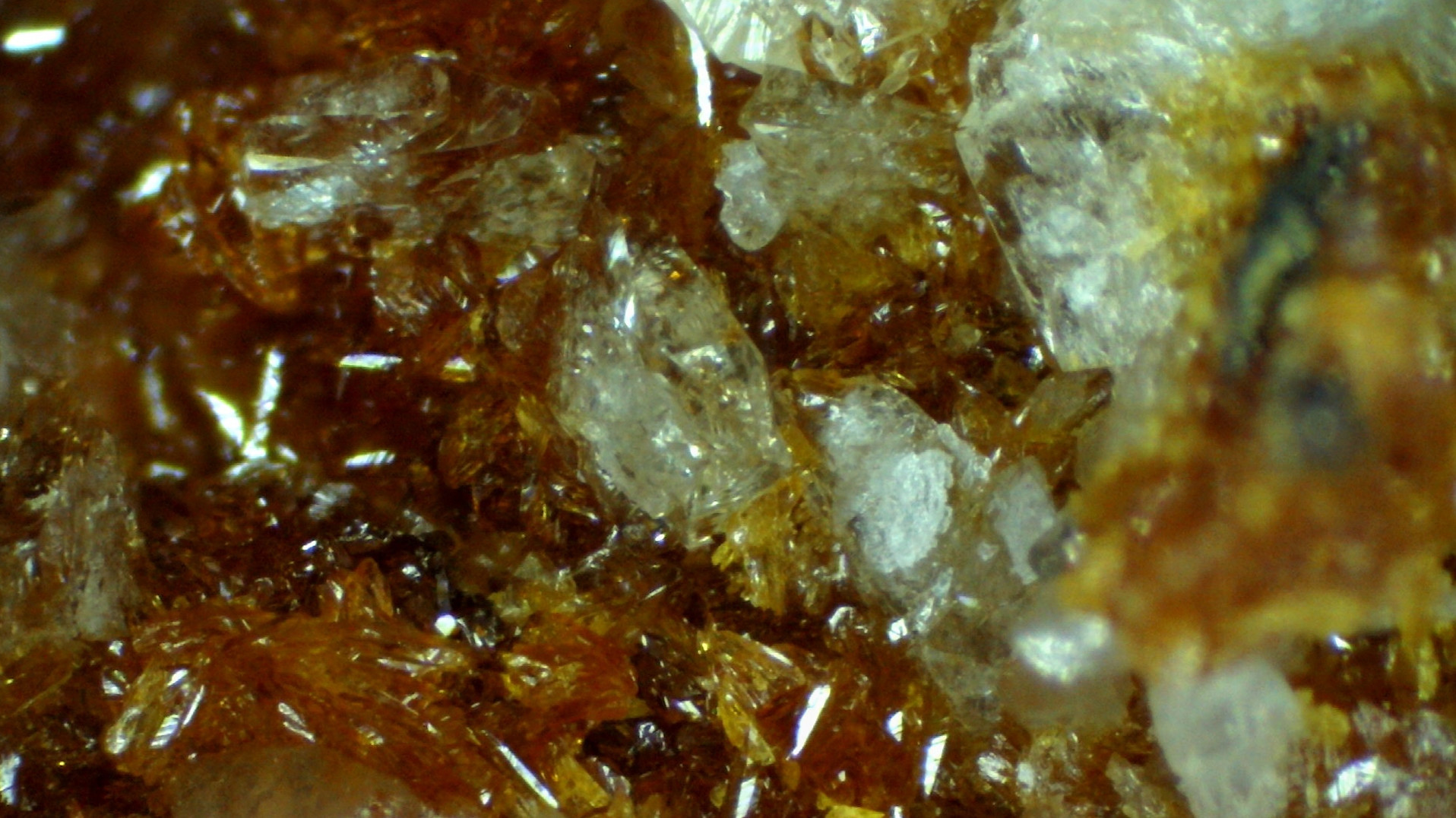

General
- Category: arsenite
- Formula: Zn_{3}(AsO_{3})_{2}
- IMA symbol: Rnr
- Strunz classification: 4.JA.10
- Crystal system: Orthorhombic
- Crystal class: Dipyramidal (mmm); H-M symbol: (2/m 2/m 2/m)
- Space group: Pbam (no. 55)
- Unit cell: a = 6.092 Å, b = 14.407 Å c = 7.811 Å; Z = 4 V = 685.55 a:b:c = 0.423 : 1 : 0.542

Identification
- Color: Sky blue, yellow green
- Crystal habit: Rough striated pseudohexagonal crystals
- Cleavage: Good on {110}, {011} and {111}
- Mohs scale hardness: 5 - 5.5
- Luster: Vitreous to adamantine
- Diaphaneity: Transparent
- Specific gravity: 4.27
- Optical properties: Biaxial (-)
- Refractive index: n_{α} = 1.740 n_{β} = 1.790 n_{γ} = 1.820
- Birefringence: Maximum δ = 0.080
- Other characteristics: Relief: very high

Reinerite is a rare arsenite (arsenate(III)) mineral with chemical formula Zn_{3}(AsO_{3})_{2}. It crystallizes in the orthorhombic crystal system.

== Physical properties ==
Reinerite is most commonly found as a sky blue colored mineral, however, it may also be a light yellowish green color. Reinerite has a relative hardness of 5 to 5.5 on the Mohs Scale which is equivalent to that of a knife blade and or shard of glass. It has a density of 4.27 g/cm^{3}, and it exhibits a nonmetallic luster that may be described as glassy or vitreous.

== Environment ==
Reinerite develops in dolomite-hosted locations. It is known especially from Namibia, Africa, within the mines of Tsumeb. At the Tsumeb location, Reinerite develops within the polymetallic lead-zinc-copper deposit, 800 m (2,600 ft) below the surface, in the second oxidation zone. It occurs in association with chalcocite, bornite, willemite, smithsonite, hydrozincite, hemimorphite, adamite, olivenite and gebhardite.

== History ==
Reinerite was first described in 1958 for an occurrence in the Tsumeb Mine, Tsumeb, Namibia and named for senior chemist Willy Reiner (1895–1965) of Tsumeb Corporation, who analyzed this mineral.
