= Tellurite (mineral) =

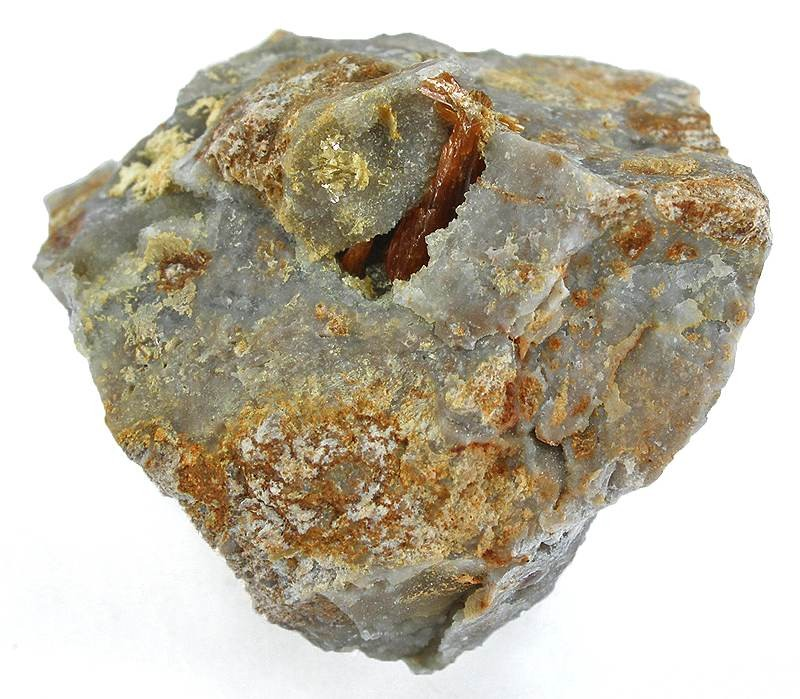

General
- Category: Oxide minerals
- Formula: TeO_{2}
- IMA symbol: Tlr
- Strunz classification: 4.DE.20
- Crystal system: Orthorhombic
- Crystal class: Dipyramidal (mmm); H-M symbol: (2/m 2/m 2/m)
- Space group: Pbca
- Unit cell: a = 5.6 Å, b = 12.03 Å c = 5.46 Å; Z = 8

Identification
- Color: Yellow to white
- Crystal habit: Flattened prismatic to acicular crystals, radiating groups; powdery, massive
- Cleavage: Perfect on {010}
- Tenacity: Flexible
- Mohs scale hardness: 2
- Luster: Sub-adamantine
- Diaphaneity: Transparent to opaque
- Specific gravity: 5.88 - 5.92
- Optical properties: Biaxial (-)
- Refractive index: n_{α} = 2.000 n_{β} = 2.180 n_{γ} = 2.350
- Birefringence: δ = 0.350
- Solubility: Slight in water

Tellurite is a rare oxide mineral composed of tellurium dioxide (TeO_{2}).

It occurs as prismatic to acicular transparent yellow to white orthorhombic crystals. It occurs in the oxidation zone of mineral deposits in association with native tellurium, emmonsite and other tellurium minerals. Its name comes from Tellus, which is the Latin name for the planet Earth.

It was first described in 1842 because of an occurrence in Faţa Băii, Zlatna, Alba County, Romania.
