= Huemulite =

Mineral

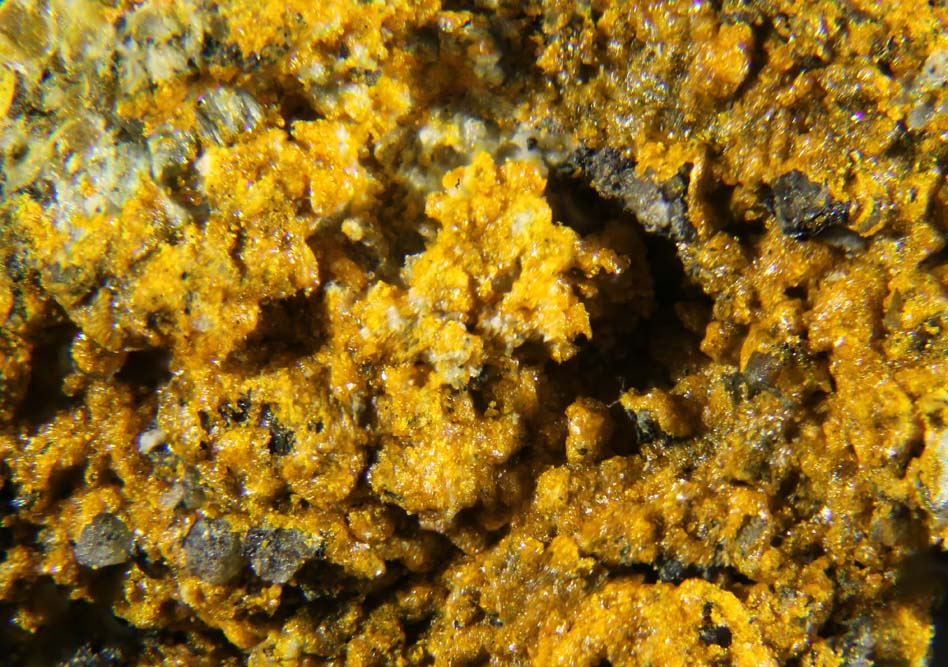

General
- Category: Oxide mineral
- Formula: Na_{4}Mg(V_{10}O_{28})·24H_{2}O
- IMA symbol: Hml
- Strunz classification: 4.HG.10
- Dana classification: 47.2.3.1
- Crystal system: Triclinic
- Space group: P1̅ (no. 2)
- Unit cell: a = 9.0453(2) Å b = 11.3337(3) Å c = 11.7372(8) Å α = 105.223(7)° β = 97.383(7)° γ = 100.790(7)°; Z = 1

Identification
- Color: Yellowish orange to orange
- Mohs scale hardness: 2.5 to 3
- Luster: Dull
- Streak: Yellow
- Diaphaneity: Translucent
- Specific gravity: 2.39 g/cm^{3}
- Optical properties: Biaxial (-)
- Refractive index: n_{α} = 1.679(3) n_{β} = 1.734(3) n_{γ} = 1.742(2)
- Birefringence: δ = 0.063
- Pleochroism: Visible
- 2V angle: 25° to 30° (measured)
- Dispersion: r > v strong
- Ultraviolet fluorescence: Not fluorescent
- Melting point: 500 °C (932 °F)
- Solubility: Soluble in water

Huemulite is a mineral with formula Na_{4}Mg(V_{10}O_{28})·24H_{2}O that is yellow to orange in color. It was first discovered in Argentina in 1959 and described in 1966. The mineral is named for the Huemul mine in which it was discovered.

== Occurrence and properties ==
Huemulite is yellowish orange to orange and bright in color. The mineral occurs as thin films, aggregates of fine fibers, botryoidal masses, and interstitial filling in host sandstone. Huemulite has been found in Argentina, the Czech Republic, the United Kingdom, and the United States. It occurs in association with epsomite, gypsum, hummerite, rossite, and thenardite.

Huemulite is a member of the pascoite group. It melts at 500 °C (932 °F) to become a red liquid. Huemulite dissolves readily in cold water to produce an orange-yellow solution with a pH of 5.5 to 6.5.

== Formation and synthesis ==
In Argentina, the mineral formed after mine tunnels were cut through Cu-U deposits in sandstone and conglomerate. The vanadium in huemulite is thought to originate from asphaltic material that occurs in association with the sandstone.

Huemulite can be synthesized by mixing stoichiometric proportions of vanadium pentoxide, magnesium carbonate, and sodium carbonate in cold water in a humid environment. The mixture is heated to dissolve the compounds which react with each other as CO_{2} is drawn off. The solution is then concentrated, excess vanadic acid is removed by filtration, and allowed to cool and crystallize.

Since huemulite dissolves easily in water, it can be recrystallized by evaporating the mineral solution. When evaporated slowly, the process creates well-formed crystals up to 5 mm (0.20 in) and 15 to 25 mg (0.00053 to 0.00088 oz). In a more humid environment, fibrous crystals or acicular radial aggregates are formed.

Both recrystallized and synthetic huemulite have tabular habit.

== Structure ==
Huemulite exhibits the triclinic crystal system with space group P1̅ and one formula unit per unit cell. The crystal structure consists of decavanadate anions (V_{10}O_{28})^{6−} linked by an interstitial complex of isolated [Mg(H_{2}O)_{6}]^{2+} and an infinite zigzag chain of [Na_{4}(H_{2}O)_{14}]^{4+}. There are a further four isolated H_{2}O groups, two of which are positionally disordered.

== History ==
Huemulite was discovered in the area of Malargüe in Mendoza Province, Argentina. The first specimen was collected in 1959 by V. Angelelli of the Geology Department of CNEA on level -18 of the Agua Botada ore body. The specimen was sent to E. Linares who determined it to be unlike any known mineral. Further specimens were collected in the mine as well as the nearby Huemul and Agua Botada Sur mines. In 1963, a preliminary report on the mineral was presented to the II Argentine Geological Congress. In 1964, the unit cell was measured at Yale University by Linares and H. Winchell and the mineral's chemical and physical properties were checked by C. E. Gordillo and R. O. Toubes. The mineral was named huemulite after the Huemul mine in which it was discovered. On May 19, 1965, the mineral and name were approved by the Commission on New Minerals and Mineral Names of the IMA. Huemulite was described in 1966 in the journal American Mineralogist by Gordillo, Linares, Toubes, and Winchell.

Synthetic huemulite was deposited by Gordillo in the Museo de Mineralogía of the Universidad Nacional de Córdoba. No type specimens were designated by them, however, a type specimen was donated by Linares to the National Museum of Natural History in Washington, D.C. Unfortunately, during a 2011 study, the only mineral detected similar to huemulite was lasalite. It was determined that Gordillo et al. most likely used fully hydrated huemulite in chemical analysis and partially dehydrated huemulite in determining the mineral's powder X-ray diffraction.

== Analysis ==
Huemulite in its natural form is too fine-grained for accurate study of its physical and optical properties; however, it can readily be recrystallized after dissolving the mineral in water. As far as can be determined, both recrystallized and synthetic huemulite are identical to natural specimens.
