= El Indio mine =

Gold mine in Coquimbo Region, Chile

El Indio
- Location within Coquimbo Region Location within Chile
- Location: Coquimbo Region, Chile; 29°44′42.36″S 69°57′58.86″W
- Products: Gold
- Opened: 1979
- Closed: 2002
- Company: Barrick Gold
- Acquired: 1994

El Indio is a closed gold mine in the Andes of Coquimbo Region, Chile. The mine lies at about 4,000 m a.s.l. in the catchment of Elqui River about 10 km west of the Argentina–Chile border. The mine lies in a larger gold district known as El Indio Gold Belt.

Some gold-rich veins of El Indio were exploited by pirquineros in 1972 and 1973 and ore was moved downhill with mules until a point where trucks could load it. The early ores extracted from the area of El Indio were of poor quality given their high arsenic content. Geologists from ENAMI studied the area the summer of 1974 with the initial aim of improving knowledge of the deposits the pirquineros whee exploiting and of understanding the source of arsenic. It was subsequently found that the arsenic came from the mineral enargite and to the surprise of the geologists it was concluded that the deposits were of a type unheard of in Chile but described in the literature from Japan, Mexico, the Philippines and the United States. A second more intensive exploration campaign was carried by ENAMI the summer of 1975. The company St. Joe Minerals was in charge of explorations efforts from 1976 to 1979 when the first gold ores of the new modern mine reached the port for export. Foreign investment in the new mine was facilitated by law Decreto Ley 600 of 1974.

Barrick Gold acquired the mine in 1994 as result of its purchase of Lac Minerals. Its closure, whose process begun in 2002, was regarded as the largest mine closure in Chile until BHP's Cerro Colorado halted operations in 2023.

== See also ==
- El Indio Gold Belt has details on the mineralogy, mining history, and current mining activity in the district.

== Bibliography ==
- Millán, Augusto (1996). Evaluación y factibilidad de proyectos mineros (in Spanish). Editorial Universitaria. ISBN 956-11-1241-8.
