= Arsenate reductase (donor) =

arsenate reductase (donor)

Identifiers
- EC no.: 1.20.99.1

Databases
- IntEnz: IntEnz view
- BRENDA: BRENDA entry
- ExPASy: NiceZyme view
- KEGG: KEGG entry
- MetaCyc: metabolic pathway
- PRIAM: profile
- PDB structures: RCSB PDB PDBe PDBsum
- Gene Ontology: AmiGO / QuickGO
Search
- PMC: articles
- PubMed: articles
- NCBI: proteins

Arsenate reductase (donor) (EC 1.20.99.1) is an enzyme that catalyzes the chemical reaction

arsenite + acceptor $\rightleftharpoons$ arsenate + reduced acceptor

Thus, the two substrates of this enzyme are arsenite and an acceptor, whereas its two products are arsenate and a reduced acceptor.

This enzyme belongs to the family of oxidoreductases, specifically those acting on phosphorus or arsenic in donor with other acceptors. The systematic name of this enzyme class is arsenate:acceptor oxidoreductase. This enzyme is also called arsenate:(acceptor) oxidoreductase.
