= George-ericksenite =

Mineral

General
- Category: Sulfate mineral
- Formula: Na_{6}CaMg(IO_{3})_{6}(CrO_{4})_{2}(H_{2}O)_{12}
- IMA symbol: Gek
- Strunz classification: 4.KD.10
- Crystal system: Monoclinic
- Crystal class: Prismatic (2/m) (same H-M symbol)
- Space group: C2/c
- Unit cell: a = 23.645 Å b = 10.918 Å c = 15.768 Å β = 114.42°; Z=4

Identification
- Color: Pale yellow (crystals) to bright lemon yellow (aggregates)
- Crystal habit: Prismatic to acicular along [001] and somewhat flattened on {110}
- Twinning: None observed megascopically nor during single-crystal study
- Cleavage: None observed
- Fracture: Unknown
- Tenacity: Brittle
- Mohs scale hardness: 3-4 (estimated)
- Luster: Vitreous
- Streak: Pale yellow
- Diaphaneity: Transparent (crystals) to translucent (aggregates)
- Density: 3.035 g/cm^{3}
- Birefringence: δ = 0.057
- Pleochroism: Slight; X 5 very pale yellow, Z 5 distinct yellow-green
- Solubility: Extreme in cold water

George-ericksenite is a mineral with the chemical formula Na_{6}CaMg(IO_{3})_{6}(CrO_{4})_{2}(H_{2}O)_{12}. It is vitreous, pale yellow to bright lemon yellow, brittle, and features a prismatic to acicular crystal habit along [001] and somewhat flattened crystal habit on {110}. It was first encountered in 1984 at the Pinch Mineralogical Museum. One specimen of dietzeite from Oficina Chacabuco, Chile had bright lemon-yellow micronodules on it. These crystals produced an X-ray powder diffraction pattern that did not match any XRD data listed for inorganic compounds. The X-ray diffraction pattern and powder mount were set aside until 1994. By then, the entire mineral collection from the Pinch Mineralogical Museum had been purchased by the Canadian Museum of Nature. The specimen was then retrieved and studied further. This study was successful and the new mineral george-ericksenite was discovered. The mineral was named for George E. Ericksen who was a research economic geologist with the U.S. Geological Survey for fifty years. The mineral and name have been approved by Commission on New Minerals and Mineral Names (IMA). The specimen, polished thin section, and the actual crystal used for the structure determination are kept in the Display Series of the National Mineral Collection of Canada at the Canadian Museum of Nature, Ottawa, Ontario.

== Description ==
=== Occurrence and paragenesis ===
George-ericksonite is commonly found as isolated bright lemon-yellow micronodules of crystals that are concentrated on the surface of one part of the mineral specimen. However, in some cases the micronodules occur as groupings instead of isolated occurrences. The average size of these micronodules is approximately 0.2 mm and each consists of numerous individual crystals in random orientation.

=== Electron microprobe examination ===
This examination was carried out by attaching two acicular crystals to the surface of a disk with epoxy and then examining them with a CAMECA SX-50 electron microprobe. One of the crystals had the (100) surface facing up, and the other crystal had a growth face of the form (110) facing up. The microprobe was operating in wavelength-dispersive mode at 15 kV and ran various currents from 20 nA to 0.5 nA. The CAMECA SX-50 has three spectrometers and the samples were examined in the sequence (Na, Cl, I), then (Mg, S, Ca). When the crystal was exposed to the electron beam for the first 200 seconds, the counts per second on each element varied greatly which indicates that the crystals are extremely unstable in the electron beam. The counts per second for each element were also dependent on the surface of the crystal [(100) or (110)] analyzed. Over shorter counting times (<10 s) at 15 kV and 5 nA, there is a gain in I_{2}O_{5} and a drop in Na_{2}O relative to ideal values. However, a significant orientation effect exists for SO_{3} and CaO values for the (100) and (110) surfaces on either side of the ideal values. With increasing exposure to the electron beam, Na_{2}O increases and all other oxides decrease. This behavior is also more rapid on the (100) surface than on the (110) crystal face. The (100) surface is overall more reactive to the electron beam than the (110) surface, but both surfaces seem to approach equilibrium with the beam and give similar oxides weight percentages after 200 seconds.

Even at low currents and short counting times george-ericksenite is extremely unstable under the electron beam. After examination, the crystal faces are stained brown from the reaction with I_{2} and the decrease in analyzed I_{2}O_{5} with increasing time. The crystallographic orientation of the material analyzed has a large impact on the analytical values at any given time. The overall quantitative behavior of george-ericksenite in the electron beam is consistent with the chemical composition derived (ideally I_{2}O_{5} 59.13, CrO_{3} 9.92. SO_{3} 1.51, MgO 2.38, CaO 3.31, Na_{2}O 10.98, H_{2}O 12.77 weight %).

== Crystal structure ==
=== Data collection ===
A 0.046 X 0.059 X 0.060 mm^{3} crystal was mounted on a Siemans P4 four-circle diffractometer. The crystal was aligned using 42 reflections automatically centered following measurement from a rotation photograph. The orientation matrix and unit-cell dimensions were determined from the setting angles of least-squares refinement. 3872 reflections were recorded out to 60^{°} 2θ with a fixed scan speed of 1.33° 2θ/min. Corrections for absorption by Gaussian quadrature integration were applied. Corrections for Lorentz, polarization, and background effects were also applied as well as reduction of intensities to structure factors.

=== Structure solution and refinement ===
The SHELXTL PC Plus system of programs were used for the calculations. The R and Rw indices are of the conventional form. The structure was solved by direct methods. The structure is centrosymmetric as indicated by the E statistics. Systematic absences also indicate the presence of a c glide for the C-centered cell. The result was placing george-ericksenite in the C2/c space group. The structure was refined by a combination of least-squares refinement and difference-Fourier synthesis to an R index of 3.5% and Rw equal to 3.5%. Site occupancies were determined by the basis of site-scattering refinement and crystal-chemical criteria.

== Description of the structure ==
=== Cation coordination ===
There is one chromium (Cr) site that is symmetrically distinct and is tetrahedrally coordinated by four oxygen (O) atoms. The average length of the bonds is 1.61 Å which indicates that the Cr cation is hexavalent. The average bond length at the Cr site is less than would be expected for complete occupancy by Cr^{6+}. This difference can be accounted for by partial substitution of sulfur (S) atoms.

There are three iodine (I) sites that are coordinated by three oxygen (O) atoms arranged in a triangle to one side of the cation. The distances of the bonds between the I and O atoms is 1.81 Å. This results in the IO_{3} group forming a triangular pyramid with the I site at the top of the pyramid. At each I sites there are also three additional ligands that causes the iodine atoms to have a distorted octahedral coordination. This also causes the I atom to occupy off centered positions within each octahedron. The long bonds between the atoms at the I sites contributes significant bond valence to the bonded anions.

There are three sodium (Na) sites that are each unique. Each site has a different type of coordination. The Na1 site is encompassed by two O atoms and four H_{2}O groups in a distorted octahedral arrangement with a Na1-Φ distance (where Φ=unspecified ligand) of 2.41 Å. The Na2 site is surrounded by five O atoms and 2 H_{2}O groups in an augmented octahedral arrangement with a Na2-Φ distance of 2.54 Å. The Na3 site is surrounded by five O atoms and three H_{2}O atoms in a triangular dodecahedral arrangement with a Na3-Φ distance of 2.64 Å.

There is only one magnesium (Mg) site which is coordinated by six O atoms in an octahedral arrangement with a Mg-O distance of 2.09 Å. This bond length is in accord with this site being entirely occupied by Mg with not substitution.

The one calcium (Ca) site is coordinated by six O atoms and two H_{2}O groups in a square-antiprismatic arrangement with a Ca-Φ distance of 2.50 Å. This bond length is in accord with this site being entirely occupied by Ca with not substitution.

=== Structure topology ===
George-ericksenite features a structural arrangement that is composed of slabs of polyhedra orthogonal to [100]. These slabs feature the same composition as the mineral itself and are a half of a unit thick in the [100] direction. These are connected to adjacent slabs solely by hydrogen bonding. The edges of each slab are bounded by near-planar layers of anions. The slabs themselves are composed of three planar layers of cations. There are also three planar layers of cations parallel to the edges of the slabs. This indicates that each slab consists of three layers of polyhedra. The c-glide symmetry relates the top and bottom of the slab which means the slab may be broken into two unique sheets of polyhedra.

There is a prominent zigzag pattern of chains of Na polyhedra extending in the c direction on the outer layer of the slab. The Na1 octahedron shares an edge with the Na2 augmented octahedron which shares a face with the Na3 triangular dodecahedron. This forms a linear trimer that extends in the [011] direction. This trimer is then links by edge-sharing between the Na3 and a1 polyhedra to another trimer extending in the [0-11] direction. This motif continues to form a [Na_{3}Φ_{14}] zigzag chain extending in the c direction. In each embayment of this chain the polyhedra are accented by two (IO_{3+3}) groups. Identical chains run parallel to the c axis that are linked only by one weak I-O bond.

The inner layer of the slab is composed of one Mg octahedron that shares corners with two Cr tetrahedra. This forms a [MT_{2}Φ_{12}] cluster. The other two anions of the Mg octahedron link by corner-sharing to two (IO_{3+3}) groups. These [Mg(CrO_{4})_{2}(IO_{3+3})_{2}O_{2}] clusters link together two (CaΦ_{8}) polyhedra. This forms chains parallel to the b axis. Weak I-O bonds link these chains to form the central layer of the slab.

=== Relation to other minerals ===
The only other chromate-iodate mineral is dietzeite, Ca(IO_{3})_{2}(CrO_{4})(H_{2}O). Dietzeite and george-ericksenite have no structural relationship. Fuenzalidaite and carlosruizite are sulphate-iodate minerals found in the Chilean nitrate fields and contain small amounts of Cr substituting for S. They are also sheet structures, but the sheets are vastly different in terms of connectivity than in george-ericksenite.
