= Hey's Mineral Index =

Hey's Mineral Index is a standard reference work in mineralogy.

It is an alphabetical index of known mineral species and varieties, and includes synonyms. For species and major varieties more detail is provided. It includes a classification of minerals based on their chemistry into 32 top-level groups, and breaks these groups down further.

== Editions ==
- First edition, An Index of Mineral Species & Varieties Arranged Chemically, With An Alphabetical Index of Accepted Mineral Names and Synonyms by Max Hutchinson Hey, published by order of the British Library, was published in 1950.
- Second edition by Max Hutchinson Hey was published in 1962.
- Third edition by Andrew M. Clark was published in 1993.
- Fourth edition by Andrew M. Clark due for publication in 2004 but was never released.

== See also ==
- Nickel–Strunz classification
