= Arsenate reductase (glutaredoxin) =

Enzyme family

arsenate reductase (glutaredoxin)

Identifiers
- EC no.: 1.20.4.1

Databases
- IntEnz: IntEnz view
- BRENDA: BRENDA entry
- ExPASy: NiceZyme view
- KEGG: KEGG entry
- MetaCyc: metabolic pathway
- PRIAM: profile
- PDB structures: RCSB PDB PDBe PDBsum
- Gene Ontology: AmiGO / QuickGO
Search
- PMC: articles
- PubMed: articles
- NCBI: proteins

Arsenate reductase (glutaredoxin) (EC 1.20.4.1) is an enzyme that catalyzes the chemical reaction

arsenate + glutaredoxin $\rightleftharpoons$ arsenite + glutaredoxin disulfide + H_{2}O

Thus, the two substrates of this enzyme are arsenate and glutaredoxin, whereas its 3 products are arsenite, glutaredoxin disulfide, and water.

This enzyme belongs to the family of oxidoreductases, specifically those acting on phosphorus or arsenic in donor with disulfide as acceptor. The systematic name of this enzyme class is glutaredoxin:arsenate oxidoreductase.

== Structural studies ==
As of late 2007, 12 structures have been solved for this class of enzymes, with PDB accession codes PDB: 1RXE, PDB: 1RXI, PDB: 1S3C, PDB: 1S3D, PDB: 1SD8, PDB: 1SD9, PDB: 1SJZ, PDB: 1SK0, PDB: 1SK1, PDB: 1SK2, PDB: 1Z2D, and PDB: 1Z2E.
