= Keystoneite =

Tellurite mineral

General
- Category: Tellurite minerals
- Group: Zemannite group
- Formula: Mg_{0.5}Ni^{2+}Fe^{3+}(Te^{4+}O_{3})_{3} · 4.5H_{2}O
- IMA symbol: Kys
- IMA status: Approved
- Strunz classification: 4.JM.05
- Dana classification: 34.3.2.3
- Crystal system: Hexagonal
- Crystal class: Hexagonal pyramidal (6)
- Space group: P6_{3} (no. 173)

Identification
- Color: Golden yellow
- Lustre: Adamantine
- Streak: Pale yellow-green
- Diaphaneity: Translucent
- Specific gravity: 4.4
- Density: 4.4 g/cm^{3}

Keystoneite is a naturally occurring tellurite mineral. It was discovered in 1988 at Keystone mine, Colorado, the type locality for which it is named. It is the Ni^{2+} analogue of zemannite.
