= Tyuyamunite =

Uranium mineral

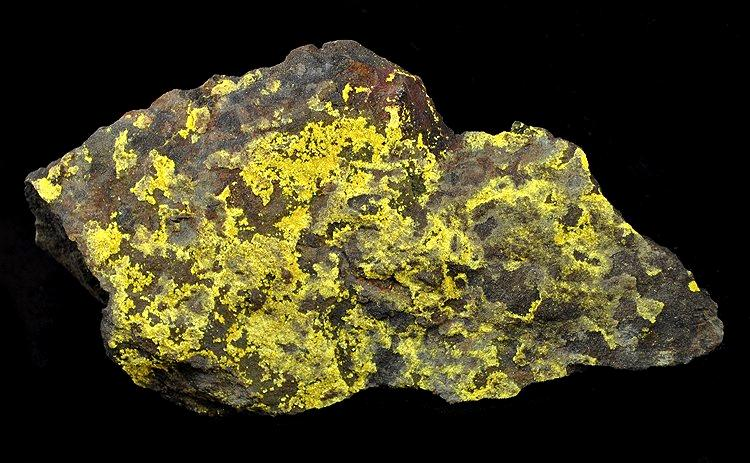

General
- Category: Vanadate mineral
- Formula: Ca(UO_{2})_{2}V_{2}O_{8}·(5–8)H_{2}O
- IMA symbol: Tyu
- Strunz classification: 4.HB.25
- Dana classification: 40.2a.26.1
- Crystal system: Orthorhombic
- Crystal class: Dipyramidal (mmm); H-M symbol: (2/m 2/m 2/m)
- Space group: Pnna
- Unit cell: a = 10.63 Å, b = 28.36 Å c = 20.4 Å; Z = 4

Identification
- Colour: Canary yellow, lemon-yellow; greenish yellow (upon exposure to sunlight)
- Crystal habit: Platy crystals often in radiating sprays, coatings, massive
- Cleavage: Perfect on {001}, micaceous; distinct on {100} & {010}
- Mohs scale hardness: 1 1/2 – 2
- Lustre: Adamantine, waxy, pearly on {101}, dull
- Streak: Yellow
- Diaphaneity: Translucent to opaque
- Specific gravity: 3.57 – 4.35
- Optical properties: Biaxial (−)
- Refractive index: n_{α} = 1.675 n_{β} = 1.860 – 1.870 n_{γ} = 1.885 – 1.895
- Birefringence: 0.210 – 0.220
- Pleochroism: weak: X = nearly colourless, Y = pale canary yellow, Z = canary yellow
- 2V angle: 30° to 45°
- Dispersion: none
- Other characteristics: Radioactive

Tyuyamunite (pronounced tuh-YOO-ya-moon-ite) is a very rare uranium mineral with formula Ca(UO_{2})_{2}V_{2}O_{8}·(5–8)H_{2}O. It is a member of the carnotite group. It is a bright, canary-yellow color because of its high uranium content. Also, because of tyuyamunite's high uranium content, it is radioactive. It was named by Konstantin Avtonomovich Nenadkevich, in 1912, after its type locality, Tyuya-Muyun, Fergana Valley, Kyrgyzstan.

== Formation and transformation ==
Tyuyamunite is formed by the weathering of uraninite, a uranium-bearing mineral. Tyuyamunite, being a hydrous mineral, contains water. Yet when it is exposed to the atmosphere it loses its water. This process changes tyuyamunite into a different mineral known as metatyuyamunite Ca(UO_{2})_{2}(VO_{4})_{2}·3-5H_{2}O.
