= Zemannite =

Very rare oxide mineral

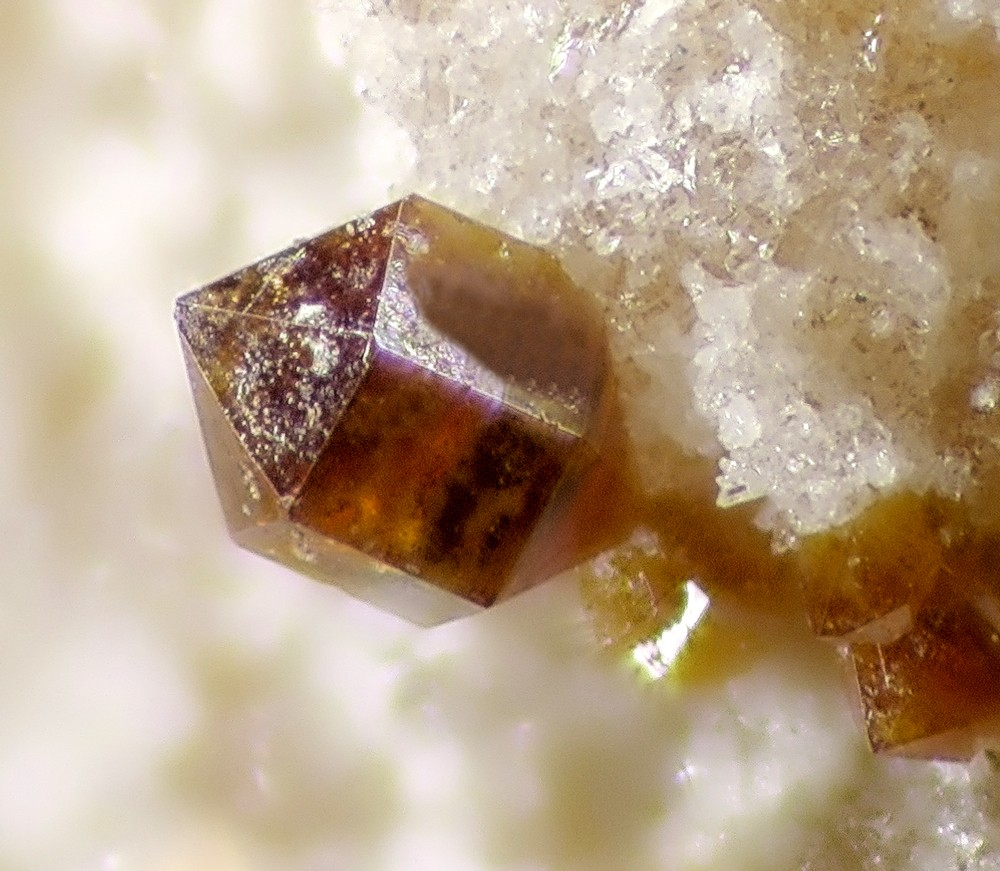

General
- Category: Oxide mineral
- Formula: Mg_{0.5}ZnFe^{3+}[TeO_{3}]_{3}·4.5H_{2}O
- IMA symbol: Zem
- Strunz classification: 4.JM.05
- Crystal system: Hexagonal
- Crystal class: Dipyramidal (6/m); H-M symbol: (6/m)
- Space group: P6_{3}/m

Identification
- Formula mass: 741.25 g/mol
- Color: Brown
- Crystal habit: Hexagonal, prismatic
- Cleavage: None
- Luster: Vitreous – adamantine
- Streak: White
- Diaphaneity: Subtransparent
- Specific gravity: 4.36
- Optical properties: Uniaxial
- Refractive index: n_{ω} = 1.85; n_{ε} = 1.93
- Birefringence: δ = 0.08
- Other characteristics: Not radioactive, not fluorescent

Zemannite is a very rare oxide mineral with the chemical formula Mg_{0.5}ZnFe^{3+}[TeO_{3}]_{3}·4.5H_{2}O. It crystallizes in the hexagonal crystal system and forms small prismatic brown crystals. Because of the rarity and small crystal size, zemannite has no applications and serves as a collector's item.

== History and etymology ==
Zemannite was discovered in 1961 in a tellurium deposit near Moctezuma, Sonora, Mexico as an unnamed new mineral. It was not accepted then by the International Mineralogical Association (IMA) due to the uncertainty in its chemical composition.

The mineral structure was solved in 1967 by Eckhart Matzat as (Na,H)_{2}(Zn,Fe)^{3+}(Mn,Mg)_{2}[TeO_{3}]_{3}·nH_{2}O is specified. Two years later, the mineral was recognized by the IMA under the name zemannite, in honor of the Austrian mineralogist Josef Zemann (born 1923), who had worked extensively on tellurium minerals.

Later investigations showed that zemannite, as well as the related mineral kinichilite, often contains impurities of sodium and magnesium and thus the formula was refined to its current form, Mg_{0.5}ZnFe^{3+}[TeO_{3}]_{3}·4.5H_{2}O.

== Related minerals ==
Zemannite is a secondary mineral produced by weathering of native tellurium minerals, such as sylvanite or calaverite. As a result of this process, the elemental tellurium or tellurium-anions (Te^{2−} or Te_{2}^{2−}) transform into the Te^{4+} cation bound with oxygen into the tellurate ion [TeO_{3}]^{2−}.

Zemannite is chemically and structurally similar to keystoneite and kinichilite; together, these minerals form the so-called "zemannite group".

In addition to Moctezuma, zemannite was also found in Vielsalm – a municipality in the Belgian province of Luxembourg and near Shimoda, Shizuoka, Japan.

== Morphology and structure ==
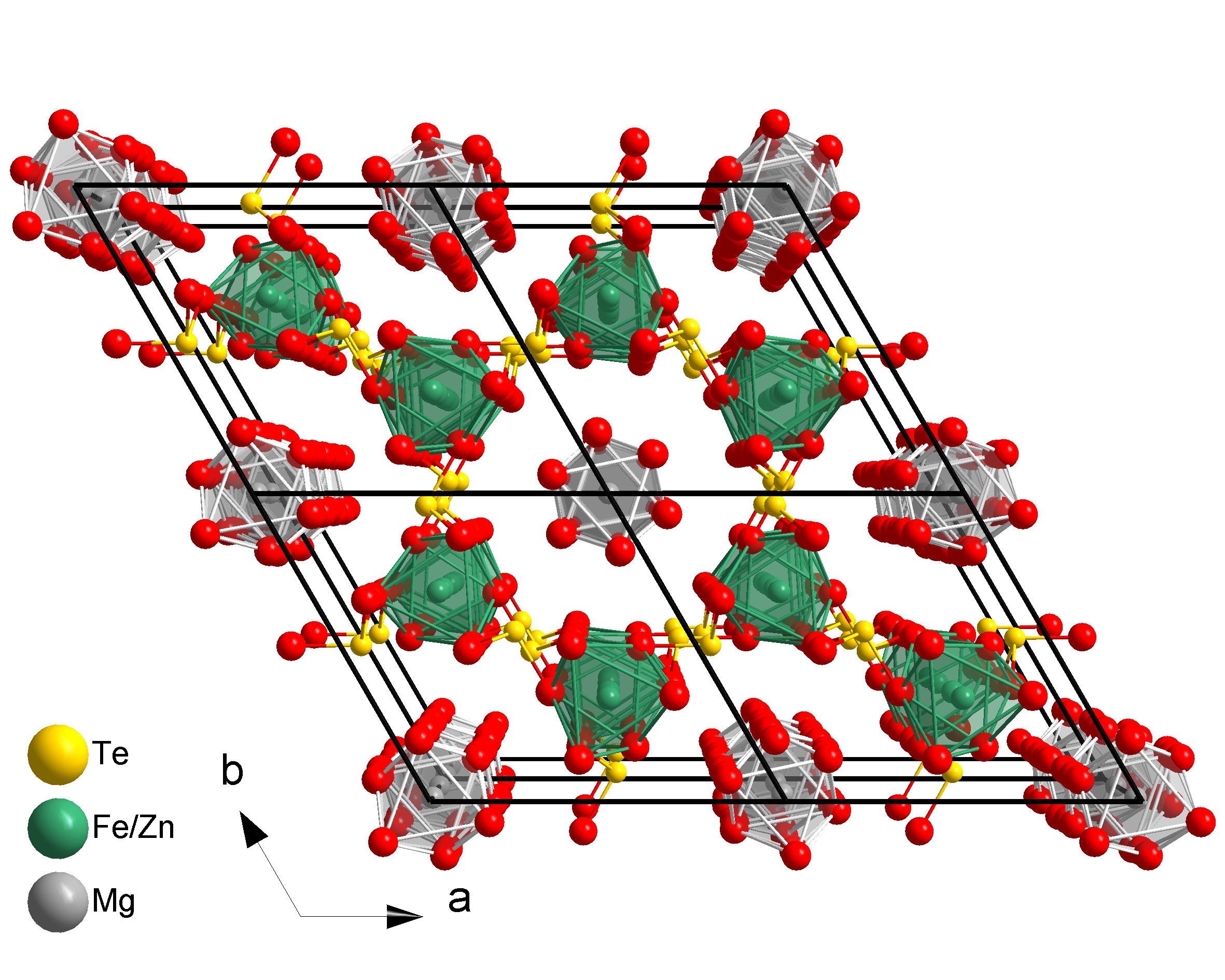
Crystal structure of zemannite.

Zemannite crystallizes in the hexagonal crystal system, space group P6_{3}m with the lattice parameters a = 941 pm and c = 764 pm and two formula units per unit cell. The Te^{4+} bind with three oxygen atoms forming [TeO_{3}]^{2−} anions, where oxygens form trigonal pyramids around the tellurium ion. The Zn^{2+} and Fe^{3+} cations share the same cite with typical respective probabilities of 40% and 60%; those values can vary from crystal to crystal. The Mn^{2+} impurity, if present, also shares the same site. This site is surrounded by a distorted octahedron of six oxygen atoms. These tellurium-oxygen and Fe/Zn-oxygen polyhedra form a network with wide (0.83 nm diameter) channels parallel to the crystallographic c axis (normal to the picture). Therefore, zemannites are often attributed to zeolite materials. The channels are often occupied by sodium impurity and water.

The Mg^{2+} cations form octahedral Mg[(H_{2}O)_{6}]^{2+} complexes with six water molecules which are located in the channels of the crystal structure. The occupancy of the Mg sites is 50% which is reflected by the coefficient 0.5 in the chemical formula.

Zemannite forms prismatic crystals, usually smaller than 1 mm. Because zemannite is secondary mineral, its crystals usually on other rocks and retain the hexagonal shape corresponding to their crystal symmetry. The ideal pyramidal tips, as in the infobox image, are often absent.
