= Guilleminite =

Rare uranium/selenium mineral

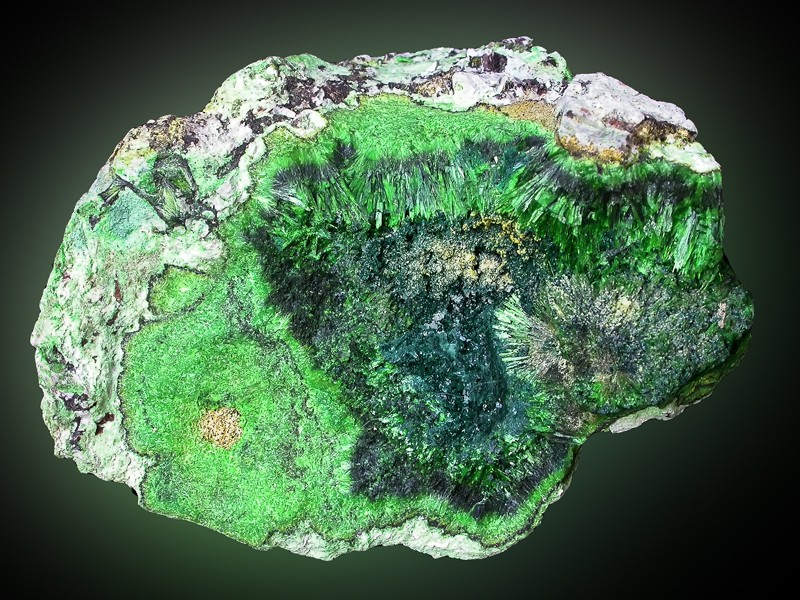
- A cuprosklodowskite vug filled with well formed dark green vandenbrandeite crystals. These are dusted over with small yellow crystals of guilleminite.

General
- Category: Oxide minerals
- Formula: Ba(UO_{2})_{3}(SeO_{3})_{2}(OH)_{4}·3H_{2}O
- IMA symbol: Gul
- Strunz classification: 4.JJ.10
- Dana classification: 34.07.03.01
- Crystal system: Orthorhombic
- Crystal class: Pyramidal (mm2) (same H-M symbol)
- Space group: P2_{1}nm
- Unit cell: 869.48 Å^{3}

Identification
- Color: Bright yellow, greenish yellow, yellow
- Cleavage: Perfect on {100}, good on {010}
- Fracture: Brittle
- Tenacity: Brittle
- Mohs scale hardness: 2
- Luster: Waxy, greasy, dull, earthy
- Diaphaneity: Transculent
- Specific gravity: 4.88
- Optical properties: Biaxial (−)
- Refractive index: nα = 1.720 nβ = 1.798 nγ = 1.805
- Birefringence: 0.085
- Pleochroism: Strong
- 2V angle: Measured 35°, calculated 32°
- Dispersion: r > v strong
- Other characteristics: Radioactive

Guilleminite (Ba(UO_{2})_{3}(SeO_{3})_{2}(OH)_{4}·3H_{2}O) is a uranium mineral named by R. Pierrot, J. Toussaint, and T. Verbeek in 1965 in honor of Jean Claude Guillemin (1923–1994), a chemist and mineralogist. It is a rare uranium/selenium mineral found at the Musonoi Mine in the Katanga Province of the Democratic Republic of the Congo.

This secondary mineral also includes barium in its structure, in addition to selenium and uranium. It is bright yellow in colour and usually has an acicular crystal habit. It has a Mohs hardness of 2–3.

== Pleochroism ==
Guilleminite shows strong pleochroic attributes. Depending on the axis the gem is seen, guilleminite on the X axis can be seen in a bright yellow color, on the Y axis can be seen yellow, and on the Z axis is seen as a colorless gem.
