= Primary mineral =

A primary mineral is any mineral formed during the original crystallization of the host igneous primary rock and includes the essential mineral(s) used to classify the rock along with any accessory minerals. In ore deposit geology, hypogene processes occur deep below the Earth's surface, and tend to form deposits of primary minerals, as opposed to supergene processes that occur at or near the surface, and tend to form secondary minerals.

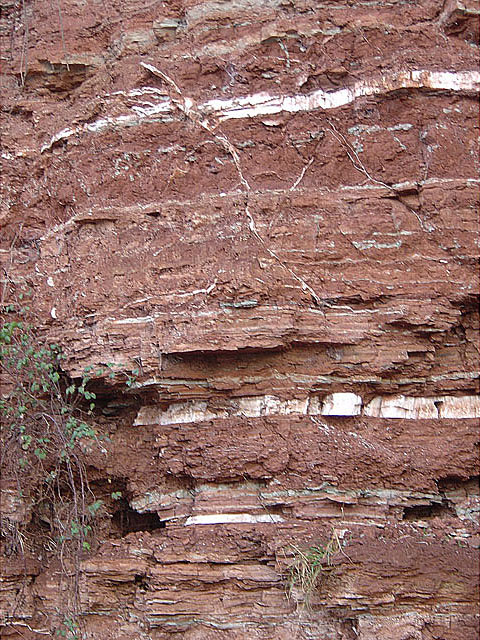
White veins of gypsum (primary/secondary sulfate mineral) near Gunthorpe in Nottinghamshire, England, UK

The elemental and mineralogical composition of primary rocks is determined by the chemical composition of the volcanic or magmatic flow from which it is formed. Extrusive rocks (such as basalt, rhyolite, andesite and obsidian) and intrusive rocks (such as granite, granodiorite, gabbro and peridotite) contain primary minerals including quartz, feldspar, plagioclase, muscovite, biotite, amphibole, pyroxene and olivine in varying concentrations. Additionally, primary sulfate minerals occur in igneous rocks. Primary sulfate minerals may occur in veins, these minerals include; hauynite, noselite, barite, anhydrite, gypsum (primary and secondary mineral), celestite, alunite (primary and secondary mineral), creedite, and thaumasite.

Primary minerals can be used to analyze geochemical dispersion halos, and indicator minerals. Furthermore, the most dominant primary minerals in soils are silicate minerals. A variety of silica groups have been discovered, and are controlled by their bonding arrangement, and silica tetrahedron.

== Geochemistry ==
=== Geochemical dispersion halos ===
Primary ore deposits contain primary ores that may develop a geochemical dispersion halo known as primary dispersion expressions. "These primary expressions are syndepositional in nature, and thus can occur at or close to the time of ore formation". Primary ore expressions may show alteration of the host rocks. These alterations include; silicification, pyritization, sericitization, chloritization, carbonate alteration, tourmalinization, and greisens.

=== Indicator minerals ===
Heavy indicator minerals can lead to a good approximation of primary geology and presence of mineral deposits. Primary indicator minerals can be used to identify gold deposits, kimberlites, and massive sulfide deposits. The indicator minerals are further used to track dispersal trains in streams, which may determine the location of primary ores/minerals, and their source.

== Characteristics ==
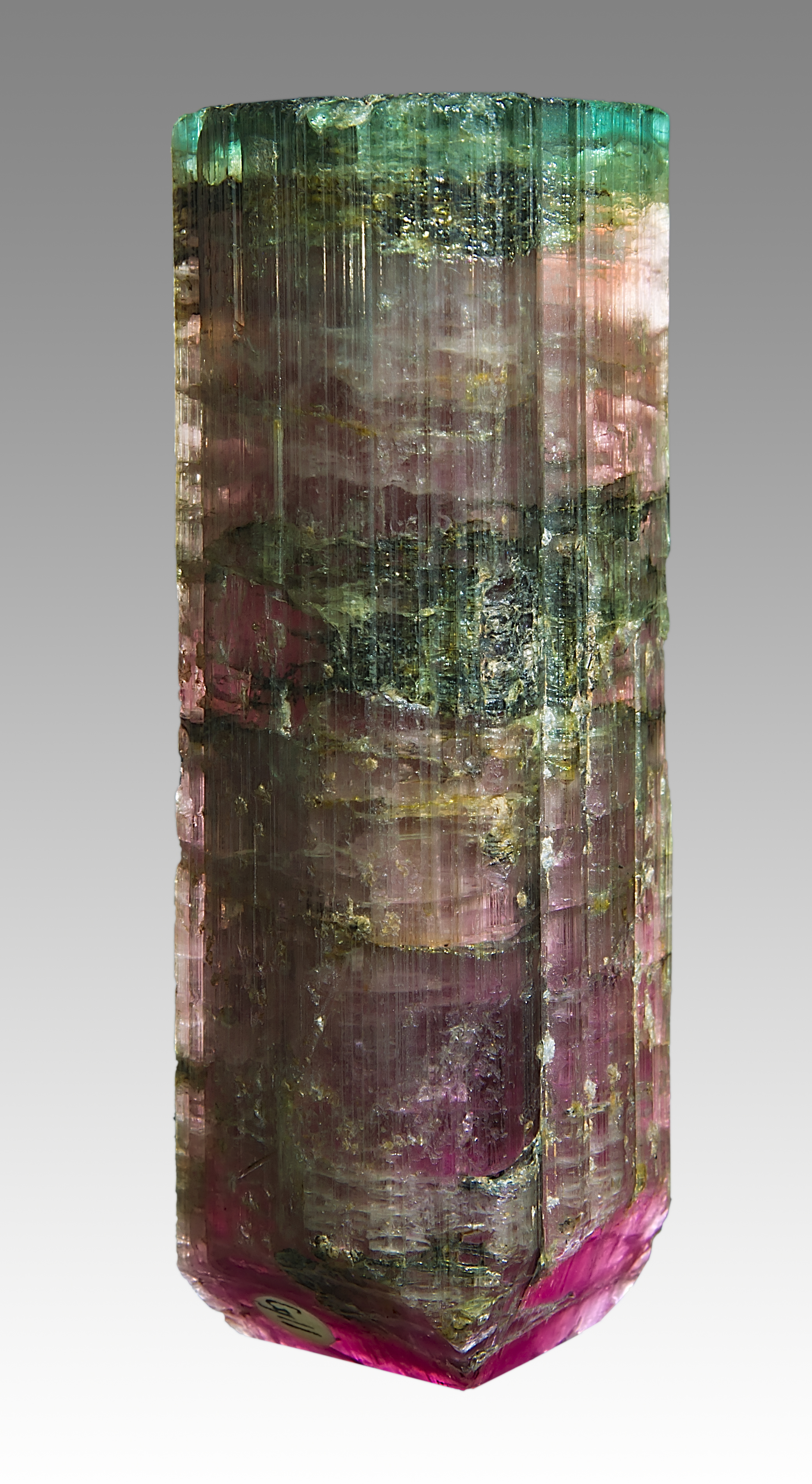
Elbaite (tourmaline) from Minas Gerais, Brazil

Minerals in soils are found in two types; primary and secondary. "A primary mineral has not been altered chemically since its crystallization from a cooling magma." Additionally, a primary mineral is defined as a mineral that is found in soil but not formed in soil, whereas secondary minerals are formed during weathering of primary minerals. The latter is further defined by Dr. Broome of North Carolina State: the particle size of primary minerals is primarily larger than 2μm, which includes; silt, sand, and gravel. The most dominant primary minerals in soil are the silicate minerals. Silicate minerals consist of more than 90% of the minerals in the Earth's crust. There are six silica mineral groups, based on bonding arrangement, and silica tetrahedron. The silica groups include: nesosilicates, sorosilicates, cyclosilicates, inosilicates, phyllosilicates, and tectosilicates. Tectosilicates such as quartz, and cristobalite are common in soils. Phyllosilicates are known as the sheet silicates, and include muscovite, biotite, and clay minerals. Cyclosilicates are known as ring silicates, and include tourmaline. Inosilicates are known as single/double chain silicates, and include amphiboles, and pyroxenes. Sorosilicates contain double silica tetrahedra, such as vesuvianite. Nesosilicates have one silica tetrahedra, such as olivine.

The earth's crust and soils are dominated by silicic acid in combination with Na, Al, K, Ca, Fe and O ions. The following elements are components of primary minerals, whereas primary minerals are components of parent rocks. Primary rocks are the source of primary minerals and primary water. For the classical discussions of the origin of primary ores, see the two publications "Ore Deposits" (1903 and 1913). According to W.A. Tarr (1938) the primary mineral deposits are the result of direct magmatic action; he states that the splitting of magmas results in the basic igneous rocks and their accompanying group of accessory minerals formed by the first crystallization in the magma, on the one hand, and in the acidic igneous rocks and a second group of accessory minerals which were formed by deposition from the residual mother liquors.

== Beneficiation of primary ores ==
Leaching of primary sulfate minerals occurs through the process of bioleaching for the separation of primary sulfide ores. Primary ores are also extracted through dense media separation (DMS), which is a technique that involves the removal of gangue through the variation of specific gravity within particles. The dense minerals (high specific gravity) containing primary ores sink, and the lighter gangue minerals float to the surface. DMS plants have been widely used for different mining applications, such as the beneficiation of lithium bearing ores from pegmatites, like the main lithium-bearing mineral known as spodumene. Another method of beneficiation is through magnetic separation. Magnetic separation involves the separation of iron-bearing gangue, such as hematite. Hematite cannot be used in the iron and steel industry without beneficiation. Roasting of primary low grade ores, such as siderite and hematite occurs further forming magnetite. Once the conversion of iron-oxides occurs, magnetic separation may proceed to extract magnetic ores. Additionally, another beneficiation technique used for primary ores is froth flotation. Froth flotation is used after roasting of primary ores, where the magnetite (or other primary ore) is further separated forming a concentrate.
