= Primary rock =

Primary rock is an early term in geology that refers to crystalline rock formed first in geologic time, containing no organic remains, such as granite, gneiss and schist as well as igneous and magmatic formations from all ages. Webster's Revised Unabridged Dictionary published in 1913 provides the following term as used in geology:

Primary rocks (geol.) a term early used for rocks supposed to have been first formed, being crystalline and containing no organic remains, as granite, gneiss, etc.; – called also primitive rocks. The terms Secondary, Tertiary, and Quaternary rocks have also been used in like manner, but of these the last two only are now in use.

— Webster's Revised Unabridged Dictionary - 1913

Ninety years later the McGraw-Hill Dictionary of Scientific & Technical Terms published in 2003 places the term in the geologic field of petrology:

Primary rocks [′prī‚mer·ē ′räks] (petrology) Rocks whose constituents are newly formed particles that have never been constituents of previously formed rocks and that are not the products of alteration or replacement, such as limestones formed by precipitation from solution.

— McGraw-Hill Doctionary of Scientific & Technical Terms - 2003

The term dates from the late 18th century (see Giovanni Arduino and Abraham Gottlob Werner) when the first attempts to formulate a geologic time scale divided crustal rocks into four types: Primary, Secondary, Tertiary, and Quaternary. Darwin used the phrase "primary rocks" in 1838 in the Geological Introduction to Zoology of The Voyage of HMS Beagle Fossil Mammalia Described by Richard Owen The last two terms have survived on most geological time scales used in the 20th and 21st centuries. For an example of the extensive use and explication of this term as debated in the mid-18th century, see "On the Origin of Eruptive and Primary Rocks" by Thomas Macfarlane and published in three parts in The Canadian Naturalist and Geologist Journal of 1863. And for an example in Australian geology literature, where it is capitalized to stress the unique use of the word, see "Report on Country in the Neighborhood of Lake Eyre" by H.Y.L. Brown, Government Geologist, published in 1892. Primary rock is also referred to as primitive rock, plutonic rock, and the crystalline basement rock of the Earth's continental cratons. It is also loosely, and less precisely, referred to as bedrock, especially in civil engineering, geophysical surveys and drilling science.

The Austrian-American astrophysicist Thomas Gold used this term in his book The Deep Hot Biosphere in the chapter titled "The Siljan Experiment" regarding the deep drilling project in Sweden to prove the theory of abiotic/abiogenic oil and gas: "...the ground of Sweden, composed almost entirely of primary rock and not of sediments...."
