= Apuanite =

Antimonite mineral

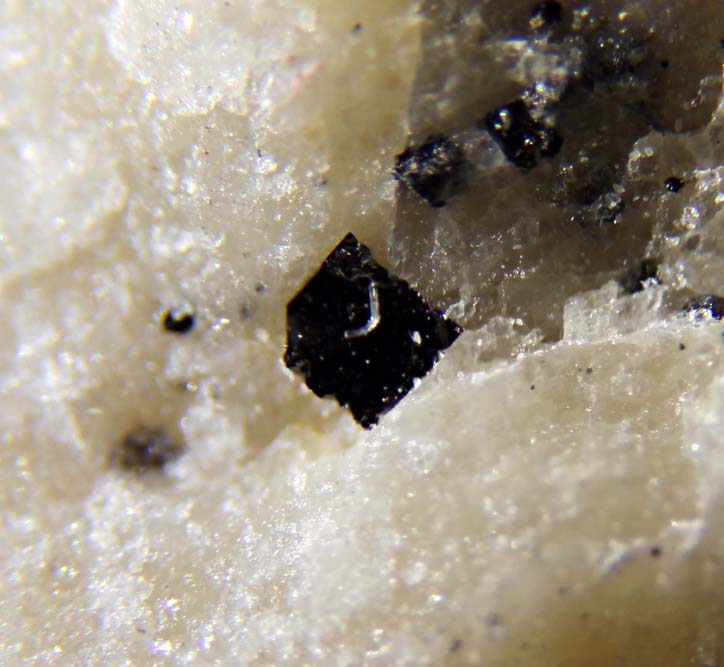
- Cubic apuanite crystal found at its type locality

General
- Category: Minerals
- Formula: Fe^{2+}Fe^{3+}_{4}Sb^{3+}_{4}O_{12}S
- IMA symbol: Apu

Identification
- Color: Black
- Mohs scale hardness: 4-5
- Luster: Metallic
- Diaphaneity: Opaque
- Specific gravity: 5.33
- Density: 5.33 g/cm3 (Measured); 5.22 g/cm3 (Calculated)

Apuanite (IMA symbol: Apu) is a rare iron antimony mineral with the chemical formula Fe^{2+}Fe^{3+}_{4}Sb^{3+}_{4}O_{12}S whose type locality is the Province of Lucca in Italy.
