= Felix Karl Ludwig Machatschki =

Austrian mineralogist

Karl Ludwig Felix Machatschki (22 September 1895 – 17 February 1970) was an Austrian mineralogist.

He was born in Arnfels (near Leibnitz) in Styria, Austria. He studied at the University of Graz, obtaining his habilitation in 1925; in 1927 he joined the group of Victor Goldschmidt in Oslo for one year. In 1930, he was appointed as a professor at the University of Tübingen. He changed university twice, first in 1941 to the Ludwig-Maximilians-Universität München, and finally in 1944 to the University of Vienna.

In 1928, he published Zur Frage der Struktur und Konstitution der Feldspäte, a paper in which he develops the concept of the atomic structure of silicates and formulates the construction principle of feldspars. In 1946 he published Grundlagen der allgemeinen Mineralogie und Kristallchemie ("Fundamentals of general mineralogy and crystal chemistry").

In 1961, Machatschki was awarded the Austrian Medal for Science and Art. The "Felix-Machatschki-Preis" is an award given by the Österreichische Mineralogische Gesellschaft in recognition of outstanding international scientific work in the field of mineralogy. The mineral machatschkiite commemorates his name.

== Published works ==
- Grundlagen der allgemeinen Mineralogie und Kristallchemie, 1946 – Fundamentals of general mineralogy and crystal chemistry.
- Vorräte und Verteilung der mineralischen Rohstoffe, 1948 – Inventories and the distribution of mineral resources.
- Spezielle Mineralogie auf geochemischer Grundlage, 1953 – Special mineralogy on a geochemical basis.

He was also the author of 140 individual articles in scientific journals.
