= Arsenate reductase (cytochrome c) =

Enzyme

Identifiers
- EC no.: 1.20.2.1

Databases
- IntEnz: IntEnz view
- BRENDA: BRENDA entry
- ExPASy: NiceZyme view
- KEGG: KEGG entry
- MetaCyc: metabolic pathway
- PRIAM: profile
- PDB structures: RCSB PDB PDBe PDBsum
Search
- PMC: articles
- PubMed: articles
- NCBI: proteins

Arsenate reductase (cytochrome c) (EC 1.20.2.1, arsenite oxidase) is an enzyme with systematic name arsenite:cytochrome c oxidoreductase. This enzyme catalyses the following chemical reaction

arsenite + H_{2}O + 2 oxidized cytochrome c $\rightleftharpoons$ arsenate + 2 reduced cytochrome c + 2 H^{+}

Arsenate reductase is a molybdoprotein isolated from alpha-proteobacteria that contains iron-sulfur clusters.
