= Marthozite =

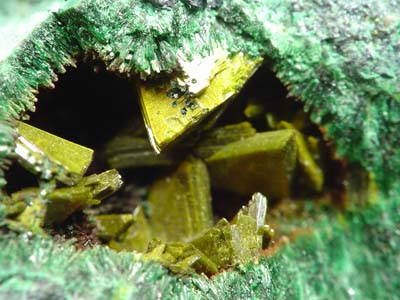
- Marthozite crystals in a vug, from Katanga (size: 6.2 x 5.3 x 4.0 cm)

General
- Category: Oxide mineral (uranyl selenite)
- Formula: Cu(UO_{2})_{3}(SeO_{3})_{3}(OH)_{2}·7H_{2}O
- IMA symbol: Mhz
- Strunz classification: 4.JJ.05
- Crystal system: Orthorhombic
- Crystal class: Pyramidal (mm2) (same H-M symbol)
- Space group: Pbn2_{1}
- Unit cell: a = 16.4 Å, b = 17.2 Å, c = 6.98 Å; Z = 4

Identification
- Formula mass: 1,303.67 g/mol
- Color: Greenish brown
- Crystal habit: Bladed
- Cleavage: {100} perfect, {010} indistinct
- Mohs scale hardness: 6
- Specific gravity: 4.44
- Optical properties: Biaxial (−)
- Refractive index: 1.780–1.800
- Pleochroism: Yellowish brown to greenish yellow
- 2V angle: 39°
- Dispersion: Extreme
- Other characteristics: Radioactive

Marthozite is an orthorhombic mineral that has a general formula of Cu(UO_{2})_{3}(SeO_{3})_{3}(OH)_{2}·7H_{2}O. It was named after Belgian mineralogist Aimé Marthoz (1894–1962), former Director-general of the Union Minière du Haut Katanga (UMHK).

It is usually found in cavities in selenian (selenium-containing) digenite. It is specifically found in the zones of oxidation of the Musonoi deposit in Katanga, Africa.

Marthozite is orthorhombic, meaning that it has three axes of unequal lengths all orthogonal to each other. Since it is orthorhombic, marthozite is biaxial, meaning that it has three different indices of refraction. Marthozite is anisotropic, which means that it breaks light into one fast ray and one slow ray. Marthozite shows pleochroism from yellowish brown to greenish yellow.
