= Arsenate reductase (azurin) =

Enzyme

arsenate reductase (azurin)

Identifiers
- EC no.: 1.20.9.1

Databases
- IntEnz: IntEnz view
- BRENDA: BRENDA entry
- ExPASy: NiceZyme view
- KEGG: KEGG entry
- MetaCyc: metabolic pathway
- PRIAM: profile
- PDB structures: RCSB PDB PDBe PDBsum
- Gene Ontology: AmiGO / QuickGO
Search
- PMC: articles
- PubMed: articles
- NCBI: proteins

Arsenate reductase (azurin) (EC 1.20.9.1) is an enzyme that catalyzes the chemical reaction

arsenite + H_{2}O + 2 azurin_{ox} $\rightleftharpoons$ arsenate + 2 azurin_{red} + 2 H^{+}

The 3 substrates of this enzyme are arsenite, water, and oxidised azurin, whereas its 3 products are arsenate, reduced azurin, and hydrogen ion.

== Classification ==
This enzyme belongs to the family of oxidoreductases, specifically those acting on phosphorus or arsenic in donor with a copper protein as acceptor.

== Nomenclature ==
The systematic name of this enzyme class is arsenite:azurin oxidoreductase. This enzyme is also called arsenite oxidase.

== Structure and function ==
The enzyme contains a molybdopterin centre comprising two molybdopterin guanosine dinucleotide cofactors bound to molybdenum, a [3Fe-4S] cluster and a Rieske-type [2Fe-2S] cluster. Also uses a c-type cytochrome or O_{2} as acceptors.
