= Rodalquilarite =

Rare iron tellurite chloride mineral

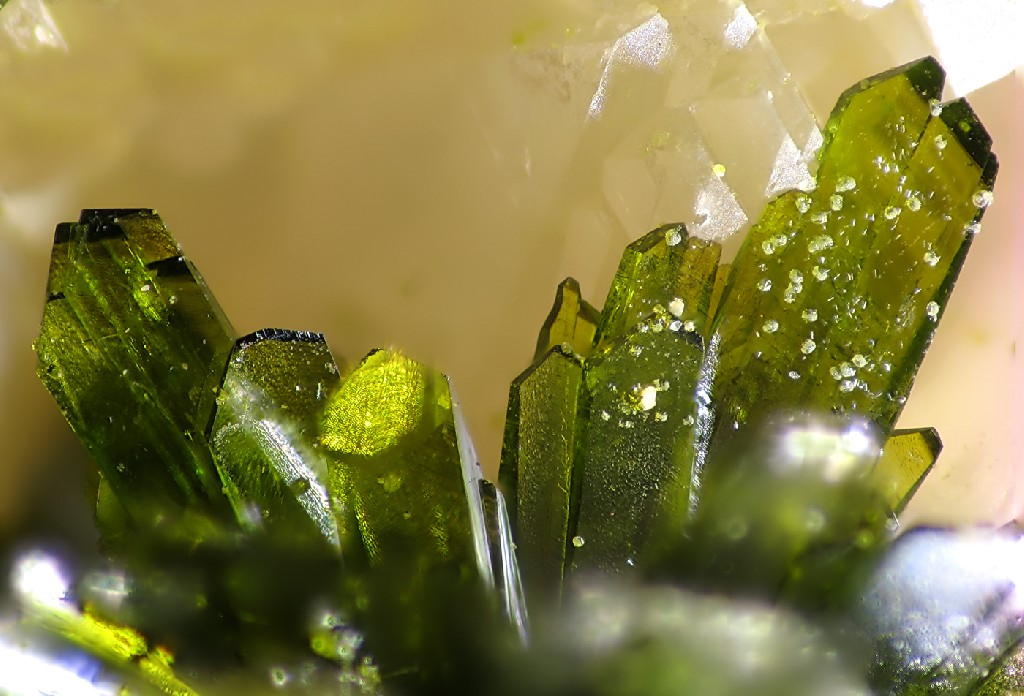
- Rodalquilarite crystals from a cavity in alunite

General
- Category: Tellurite mineral
- Formula: H_{3}Fe^{3+}_{2}(Te^{4+}O_{3})_{4}Cl
- IMA symbol: Raq
- Strunz classification: 4.JL.05
- Crystal system: Triclinic
- Crystal class: Pinacoidal (1̅) (same H-M symbol)
- Space group: P1̅
- Unit cell: a = 8.95 Å, b = 5.09 Å c = 6.63 Å; α = 103.17° β = 107.08°, γ = 77.87°; Z = 1

Identification
- Color: Emerald- to grass-green
- Crystal habit: Crusts of stout crystals
- Cleavage: One good cleavage plane
- Tenacity: Very brittle
- Mohs scale hardness: 2 - 3
- Luster: Greasy
- Streak: Greenish yellow
- Diaphaneity: Semitransparent
- Specific gravity: 4.97 - 5.15
- Optical properties: Biaxial (-)
- Refractive index: nα = 2.100 nγ = 2.200
- Birefringence: δ = 0.100
- 2V angle: 38°

Rodalquilarite is a rare iron tellurite chloride mineral with formula H_{3}Fe^{3+}_{2}(Te^{4+}O_{3})_{4}Cl or Fe_{2}(TeO_{2}OH)_{3}(TeO_{3})Cl. Rodalquilarite crystallizes in the triclinic system and typically occurs as stout green prisms and encrustations.

== Discovery and occurrence ==
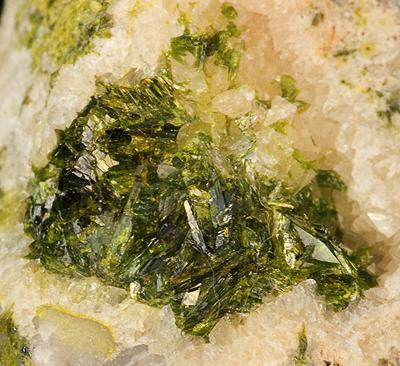
Green rodalquilarite crystals in a vug in pink alunite from Chile

Rodalquilarite was first described in 1968 for an occurrence in the Rodalquilar gold deposit of Almeria, Spain and was named for the discovery locality. It has also been reported from the Wendy open pit mine, El Indio-Tambo district, Coquimbo Region of Chile and the mines of Tombstone, Arizona. It is found in the oxidized zone of tellurium-bearing gold deposits. It occurs associated with emmonsite, native gold, alunite, jarosite, quartz, native tellurium, mackayite and sonoraite.
