= Emmonsite =

Iron tellurite mineral

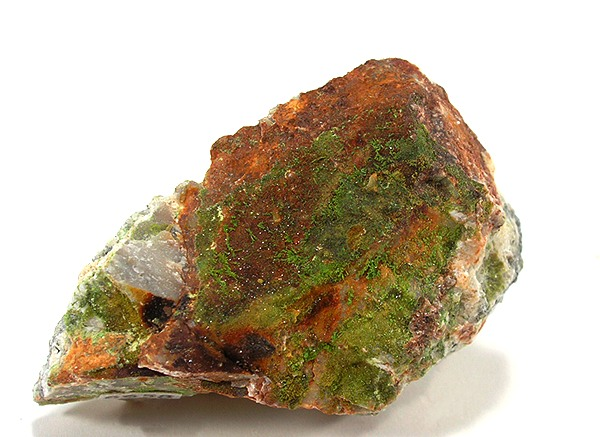
- Emmonsite. Locality: San Miguel Mine, Moctezuma, Sonora, Mexico (size: 6.3 x 4.1 x 1.1 cm)

General
- Category: Tellurite mineral
- Formula: Fe_{2}(TeO_{3})_{3}·2(H_{2}O)
- IMA symbol: Ems
- Strunz classification: 4.JM.10
- Crystal system: Triclinic
- Crystal class: Pinacoidal (1̅) (same H-M symbol)
- Space group: P1̅
- Unit cell: a = 7.90, b = 8.00 c = 7.62 [Å]; α = 96.73° β = 95°, γ = 84.47°; Z = 2

Identification
- Color: Yellowish green
- Crystal habit: Thin to hairlike crystals, occurring in rosettes and sprays; also fibrous globular aggregates and crusts
- Twinning: Noted
- Cleavage: Perfect on {010}; good on {100} and {001}
- Mohs scale hardness: 5
- Luster: Vitreous
- Diaphaneity: Opaque to translucent
- Specific gravity: 4.52–4.55
- Optical properties: Biaxial (-)
- Refractive index: n_{α} = 1.962 n_{β} = 2.090 n_{γ} = 2.100 - 2.120
- Birefringence: δ = 0.138 - 0.158
- Pleochroism: Weak
- 2V angle: Measured: 23°

Emmonsite, also known as durdenite, is an iron tellurite mineral with the formula: Fe_{2}(TeO_{3})_{3}·2(H_{2}O). Emmonsite forms triclinic crystals. It is of a yellowish-green color, with a vitreous luster, and a hardness of 5 on the Moh scale.

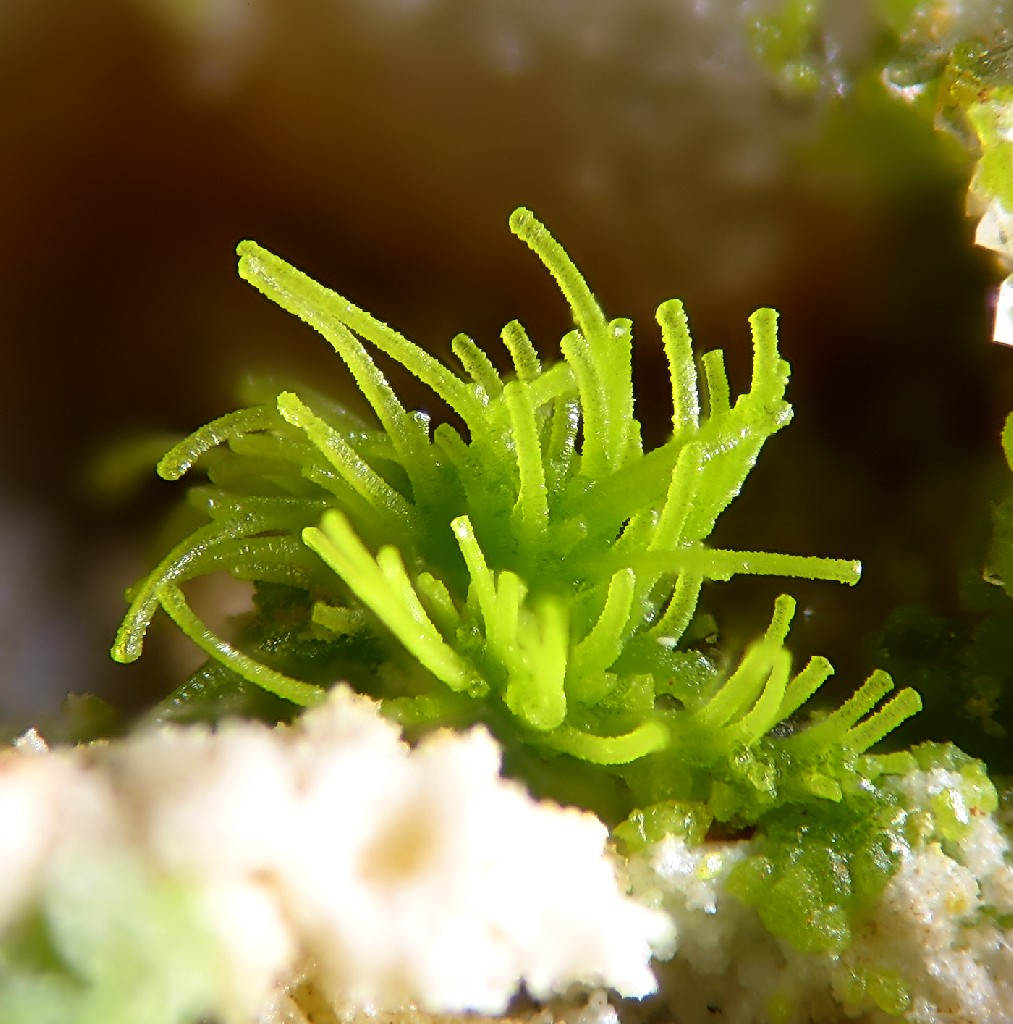
Emmonsite crystal spray from the Moctezuma Mine (3 mm image width)

Emmonsite was first described in 1885 for an occurrence in the Tombstone District, Cochise County, Arizona. It was named for the American geologist, Samuel Franklin Emmons, (1841–1911), of the United States Geological Survey.

Emmonsite is found, often with quartz or cerussite in the Tombstone, Arizona area. It is also associated with native tellurium, tellurite, native gold, pyrite, rodalquilarite, mackayite, sonoraite, cuzticite and eztlite.
