= Vanuralite =

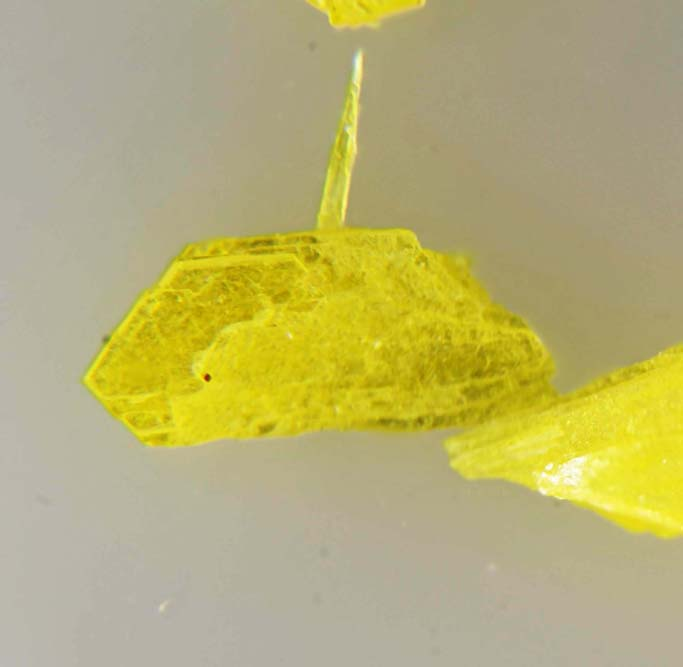

General
- Category: Minerals
- Formula: Al(UO_{2})_{2}(VO_{4})_{2}(OH)·11(H_{2}O)
- IMA symbol: Vna

Identification
- Mohs scale hardness: 2
- Other characteristics: Radioactive

Vanuralite is a mineral of uranium with chemical formula: Al(UO_{2})_{2}(VO_{4})_{2}(OH)·11(H_{2}O). It has yellow crystals and a Mohs hardness of 2. The name comes from the composition of the mineral.

== Bibliography ==
- Mindat.org
- Webmineral data
