= Arsenite =

Chemical compounds containing arsenic at oxidation state +3

In chemistry, an arsenite is a chemical compound containing an arsenic oxyanion where arsenic has oxidation state +3. Note that in fields that commonly deal with groundwater chemistry, arsenite is used generically to identify soluble As^{III} anions. IUPAC have recommended that arsenite compounds are to be named as arsenate(III), for example orthoarsenite is called trioxidoarsenate(III). Orthoarsenite contrasts to the corresponding anions of the lighter members of group 15, phosphite which has the structure HPO^{2−}_{3} and nitrite, NO^{−}_{2} which is bent.

A number of different arsenite anions are known:

- AsO^{3−}_{3} orthoarsenite, an ion of arsenous acid, with a pyramidal shape
- (AsO^{−}_{2})_{n} metaarsenite, a polymeric chain anion.
- As_{2}O^{4−}_{5} pyroarsenite, [O_{2}As−O−AsO_{2}]^{4−}
- As_{3}O^{5−}_{7} catena-triarsenite, [O_{2}As−O−As(O)−O−AsO_{2}]^{5−}
- As_{4}O^{6−}_{9} catena-tetraarsenite, [O_{2}As−O−As(O)−O−As(O)−O−AsO_{2}]^{6−}
- As_{4}O^{4−}_{8} cyclo-tetraarsenite
- (As_{6}O^{4−}_{11})_{n}, a polymeric anion

In all of these the geometry around the As^{III} centers are approximately trigonal, the lone pair on the arsenic atom is stereochemically active. Well known examples of arsenites include sodium metaarsenite which contains a polymeric linear anion, (AsO^{−}_{2})_{n}, and silver orthoarsenite, Ag_{3}AsO_{3}, which contains the trigonal AsO^{3−}_{3} anion.

== Preparation of arsenites ==
Some arsenite salts can be prepared from an aqueous solution of As_{2}O_{3}. Examples of these are the metaarsenite salts and at low temperature, hydrogen arsenite salts can be prepared, such as Na_{2}H_{2}As_{4}O_{8}, NaAsO_{2}·4H_{2}O, Na_{2}HAsO_{3}·5H_{2}O and Na_{5}(HAsO_{3})(AsO_{3})·12H_{2}O.

== Arsenite minerals ==
A number of minerals contain arsenite anions: reinerite, Zn_{3}(AsO_{3})_{2}; finnemanite, Pb_{5}Cl(AsO_{3})_{3}; paulmooreite, Pb_{2}As_{2}O_{5}; stenhuggarite, CaFeSbAs_{2}O_{7} (contains a complex polymeric anion); schneiderhöhnite, Fe^{II}Fe^{III}_{3}(AsO_{3})(As_{2}O_{5})_{2}; magnussonite, Mn_{5}(OH)(AsO_{3})_{3}; trippkeite, CuAs_{2}O_{4}; trigonite, Pb_{3}Mn(AsO_{3})_{2}(HAsO_{3}); tooeleite, Fe_{6}(AsO_{3})_{4}(SO_{4})(OH)_{4}·4H_{2}O.

== Arsenites in the environment ==
Arsenic can enter groundwater due to naturally occurring arsenic at deeper levels or from mine workings. Arsenic(III) can be removed from water by a number of methods, oxidation of As(III) to As(V) for example with chlorine followed by coagulation with for example iron(III) sulfate. Other methods include ion-exchange and filtration. Filtration is only effective if arsenic is present as particulates, if the arsenite is in solution it passes through the filtration membrane.

== Uses ==
Sodium arsenite is used in the water gas shift reaction to remove carbon dioxide. Fowler's solution first introduced in the 18th century was made up from As_{2}O_{3} as a solution of potassium metaarsenite, KAsO_{2}.

Arsenic in its trioxide, As_{2}O_{3}, (brand name Trisenox, ATO) is used as a chemotherapy drug against acute promyelocytic leukaemia (APL), a type of myeloid leukemia. The detailed mechanism of action is unknown, but it is suspected to speed up apoptosis of cancer cells. Arsenic trioxide triggers morphological changes and DNA fragmentations in NB4 in vitro model for APL. It also degrades retinoic acid receptor alpha (RARA). RARA gene is important regulator of premyelocytic immune cell development, differentiation, and apoptosis.

== Bacteria using and generating arsenite ==
Some species of bacteria obtain their energy by oxidizing various fuels while reducing arsenates to form arsenites. The enzymes involved are known as arsenate reductases.

In 2008, bacteria were discovered that employ a version of photosynthesis with arsenites as electron donors, producing arsenates (just like ordinary photosynthesis uses water as electron donor, producing molecular oxygen). The researchers conjectured that historically these photosynthesizing organisms produced the arsenates that allowed the arsenate-reducing bacteria to thrive.

In humans, arsenite inhibits pyruvate dehydrogenase (PDH complex) in the pyruvate-acetyl CoA reaction, by binding to the –SH group of lipoamide, a participant coenzyme. It also inhibits the oxoglutarate dehydrogenase complex by the same mechanism. The inhibition of these enzymes disrupts energy production.
