= Nickel–Strunz classification =

Scheme for categorizing minerals

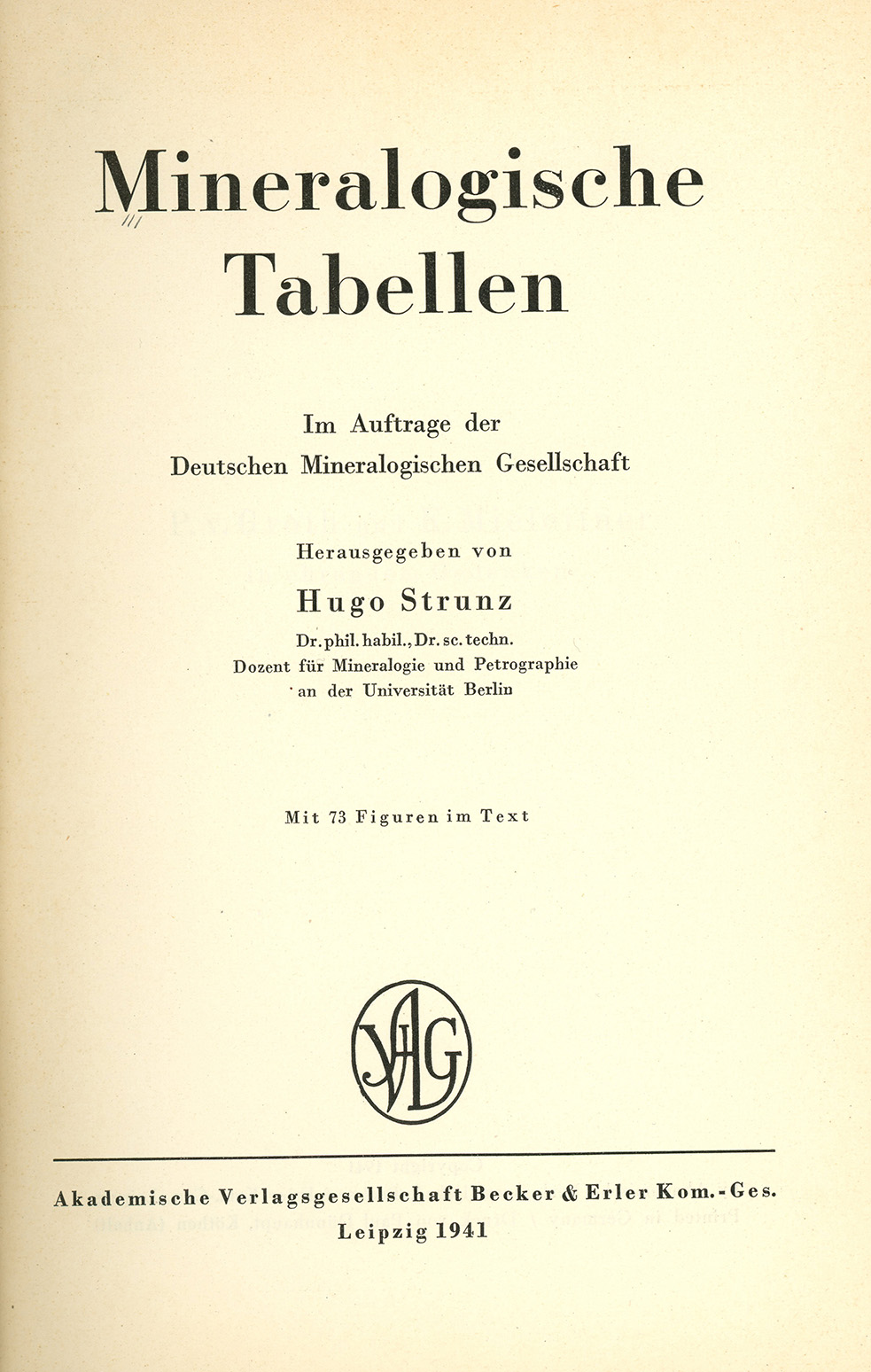
Cover of the first edition of the Strunz Mineral Classification

Nickel–Strunz classification is a scheme for categorizing minerals based upon their chemical composition, introduced by German mineralogist Karl Hugo Strunz in his Mineralogische Tabellen (1941). The 4th and the 5th edition were also edited by Christel Tennyson (1966). It was followed by A.S. Povarennykh with a modified classification (1966 in Russian, 1972 in English).

As curator of the Mineralogical Museum of Friedrich-Wilhelms-Universität (now known as the Humboldt University of Berlin), Strunz had been tasked with sorting the museum's geological collection according to crystal-chemical properties. His book Mineralogical Tables has been through a number of modifications; the most recent edition, published in 2001, is the ninth, having been revised by Ernest Henry Nickel. The IMA/CNMNC supports the Nickel–Strunz database.

== Nickel–Strunz code scheme ==
The Nickel–Strunz code scheme is NN.XY.##x, where:

- NN: Nickel–Strunz mineral class number
- X: Nickel–Strunz mineral division letter
- Y: Nickel–Strunz mineral family letter
- ##x: Nickel–Strunz mineral/group number; x an add-on letter

== Nickel–Strunz mineral classes ==
The current scheme divides minerals into ten classes, which are further divided into divisions, families and groups according to chemical composition and crystal structure.

1. elements
2. sulfides and sulfosalts
3. halides
4. oxides, hydroxides and arsenites
5. carbonates and nitrates
6. borates
7. sulfates, chromates, molybdates and tungstates
8. phosphates, arsenates and vanadates
9. silicates
10. organic compounds

== IMA/CNMNC mineral classes ==
IMA/CNMNC proposes a new hierarchical scheme (Mills et al. 2009), using the Nickel–Strunz classes (10 ed) this gives:

- Classification of minerals (non silicates)
  - Nickel–Strunz class 01: Native Elements
    - Class: native elements
  - Nickel–Strunz class 02: Sulfides and Sulfosalts
    - Class 02.A – 02.G: sulfides, selenides, tellurides (including arsenides, antimonides, bismuthinides)
    - Class 02.H – 02.M: sulfosalts (including sulfarsenites, sulfantimonites, sulfobismuthites, etc.)
  - Nickel–Strunz class 03: Halogenides
    - Class: halides
  - Nickel–Strunz class 04: Oxides
    - Class: oxides
    - Class: hydroxides
    - Class: arsenites (including antimonites, bismuthites, sulfites, selenites and tellurites)
  - Nickel–Strunz class 05: Carbonates and Nitrates
    - Class: carbonates
    - Class: nitrates
  - Nickel–Strunz class 06: Borates
    - Class: borates
      - Subclass: nesoborates
      - Subclass: soroborates
      - Subclass: cycloborates
      - Subclass: inoborates
      - Subclass: phylloborates
      - Subclass: tectoborates
  - Nickel–Strunz class 07: Sulfates, Selenates, Tellurates
    - Class: sulfates, selenates, tellurates
    - Class: chromates
    - Class: molybdate, wolframates and niobates
  - Nickel–Strunz class 08: Phosphates, Arsenates, Vanadates
    - Class: phosphates
    - Class: arsenates and vanadates
  - Nickel–Strunz class 10: Organic Compounds
    - Class: organic compounds
- Classification of minerals (silicates)
  - Nickel–Strunz class 09: Silicates and Germanates
    - Class: silicates
      - Subclass: nesosilicates
      - Subclass: sorosilicates
      - Subclass: cyclosilicates
      - Subclass: inosilicates
      - Subclass: phyllosilicates
      - Subclass: tectosilicates without zeolitic H_{2}O
      - Subclass: tectosilicates with zeolitic H_{2}O; zeolite family
      - Subclass: unclassified silicates
      - Subclass: germanates

== See also ==
- Classification of non-silicate minerals
- Classification of silicate minerals
- Hey's Mineral Index
- Timeline of the discovery and classification of minerals
- Dana Classification System
