= List of minerals recognized by the International Mineralogical Association (R) =

This list includes those recognised minerals beginning with the letter R. The International Mineralogical Association is the international group that recognises new minerals and new mineral names; however, minerals discovered before 1959 did not go through the official naming procedure, although some minerals published previously have been either confirmed or discredited since that date. This list contains a mixture of mineral names that have been approved since 1959 and those mineral names believed to still refer to valid mineral species (these are called "grandfathered" species).

The list is divided into groups:

- Introduction • (Main synonyms)
- A • B • C • D • E • F • G • H • I • J • K • L • M • N • O • P–Q • R • S • T • U–V • W–X • Y–Z

The data was exported from mindat.org on 29 April 2005; updated up to 'IMA2021'.

The minerals are sorted by name, followed by the structural group (rruff.info/ima and ima-cnmnc by mineralienatlas.de, mainly) or chemical class (mindat.org and basics), the year of publication (if it's before of an IMA approval procedure), the IMA approval and the Strunz-mindat code. The first link is to mindat.org, the second link is to webmineral.com, and the third is to the Handbook of Mineralogy (Mineralogical Society of America).

- Abbreviations:
  - ^{D} – discredited (IMA/CNMNC status).
  - ^{Q} – questionable/ doubtful (IMA/CNMNC, mindat.org or mineralienatlas.de status).
  - ^{N} – published without approval of the IMA/CNMNC, or just not an IMA approved mineral but with some acceptance in the scientific community nowadays.
  - ^{I} – intermediate member of a solid-solution series.
  - ^{H} – hypothetical mineral (synthetic, anthropogenic, suspended approval procedure, etc.)
    - ^{ch} – incomplete description, hypothetical solid solution end member.
  - Rd – redefinition of ...
  - "s.p." – special procedure.
  - group – a name used to designate a group of species, sometimes only a mineral group name.
  - no – no link available.
  - IUPAC – chemical name.
  - Y: NNNN – year of publication.
  - Y: old – known before publications were available.

== R ==
=== Ra – Re ===
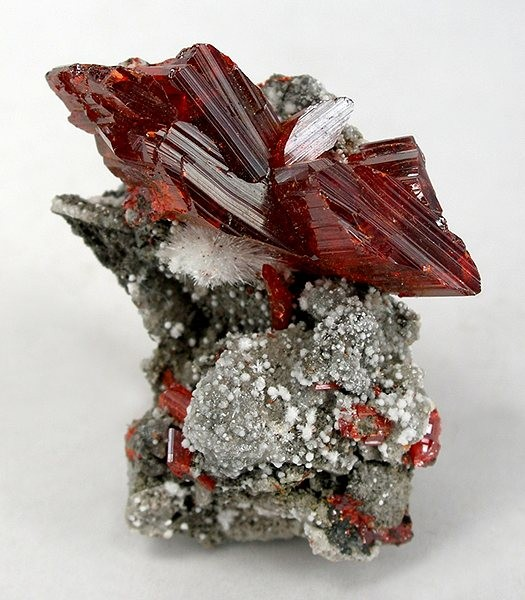
Cherry-red realgar crystals atop a matrix, and a sharp acicular spray of the rare species picropharmacolite (white needles) below

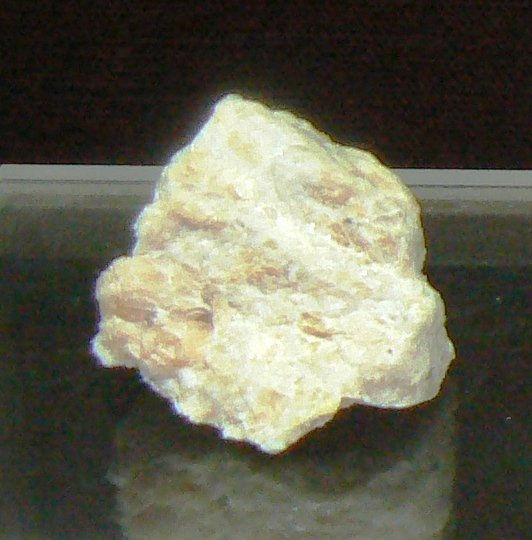
Reedmergnerite, Dara-i-Pioz, Tajikistan

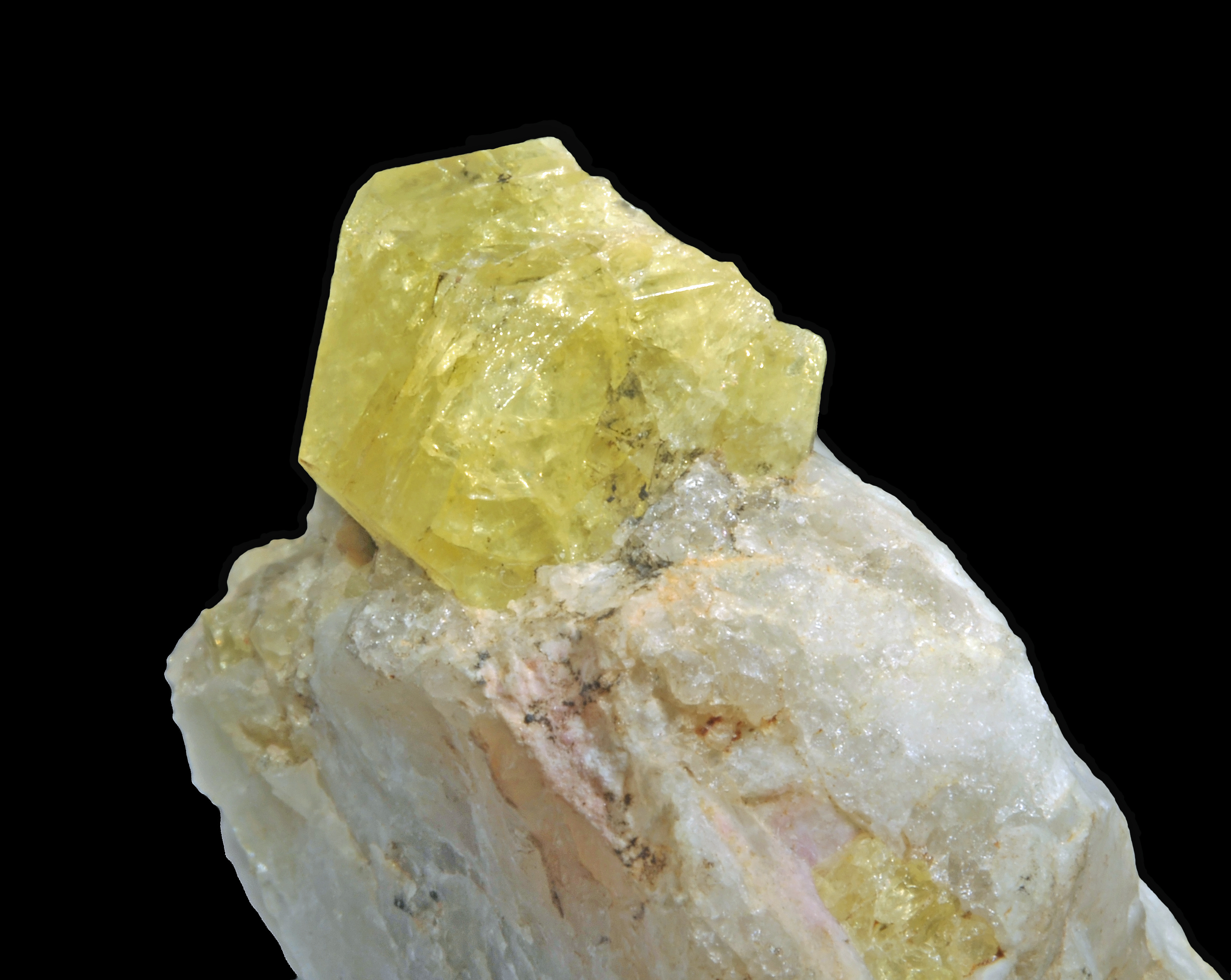
Rhodizite crystal: Tetezantsio village, Ampasagona, Vakinankaratra region, Antananarivo Province, Madagascar

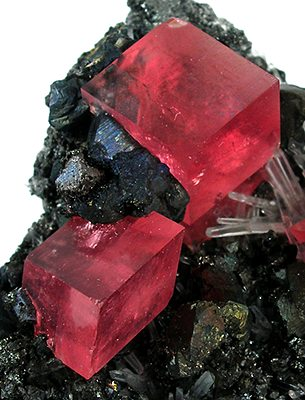
Chalcopyrite, quartz, rhodochrosite (red) Octahedron Pocket, Mini King Raise, Sweet Home Mine, Alma, Colorado, US

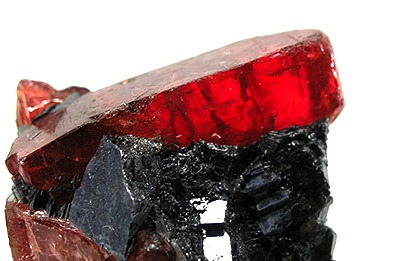
Rhodonite on galena. Broken Hill, Yancowinna County, New South Wales, Australia

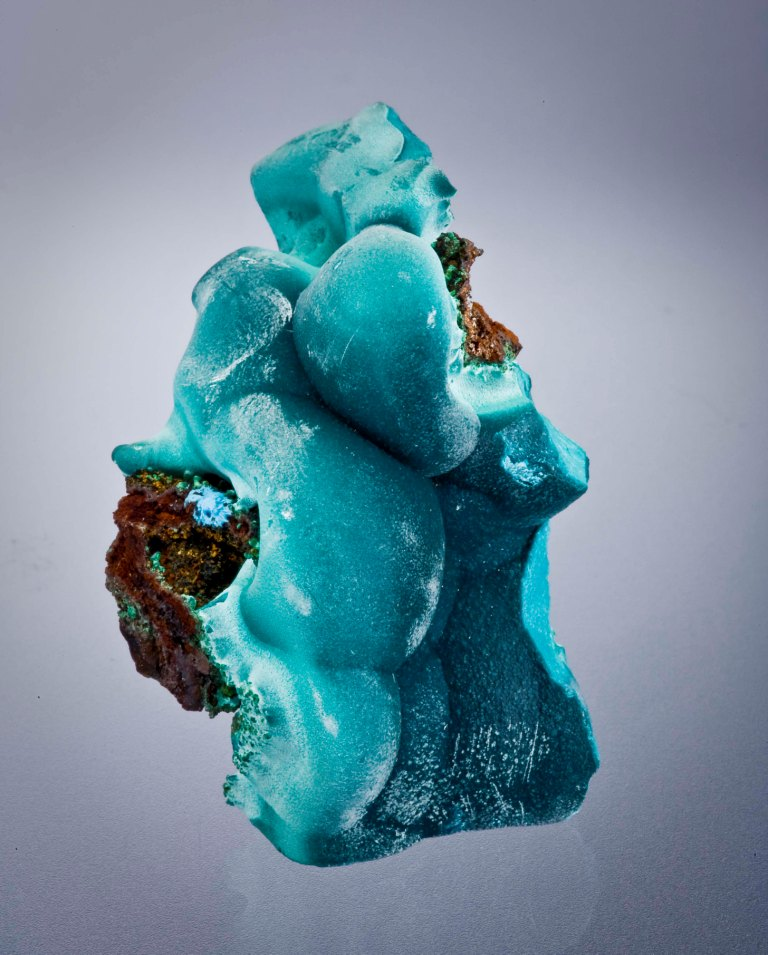
Rosasite. Ojuela Mine, Mapimí, Municipio de Mapimí, Durango, Mexico

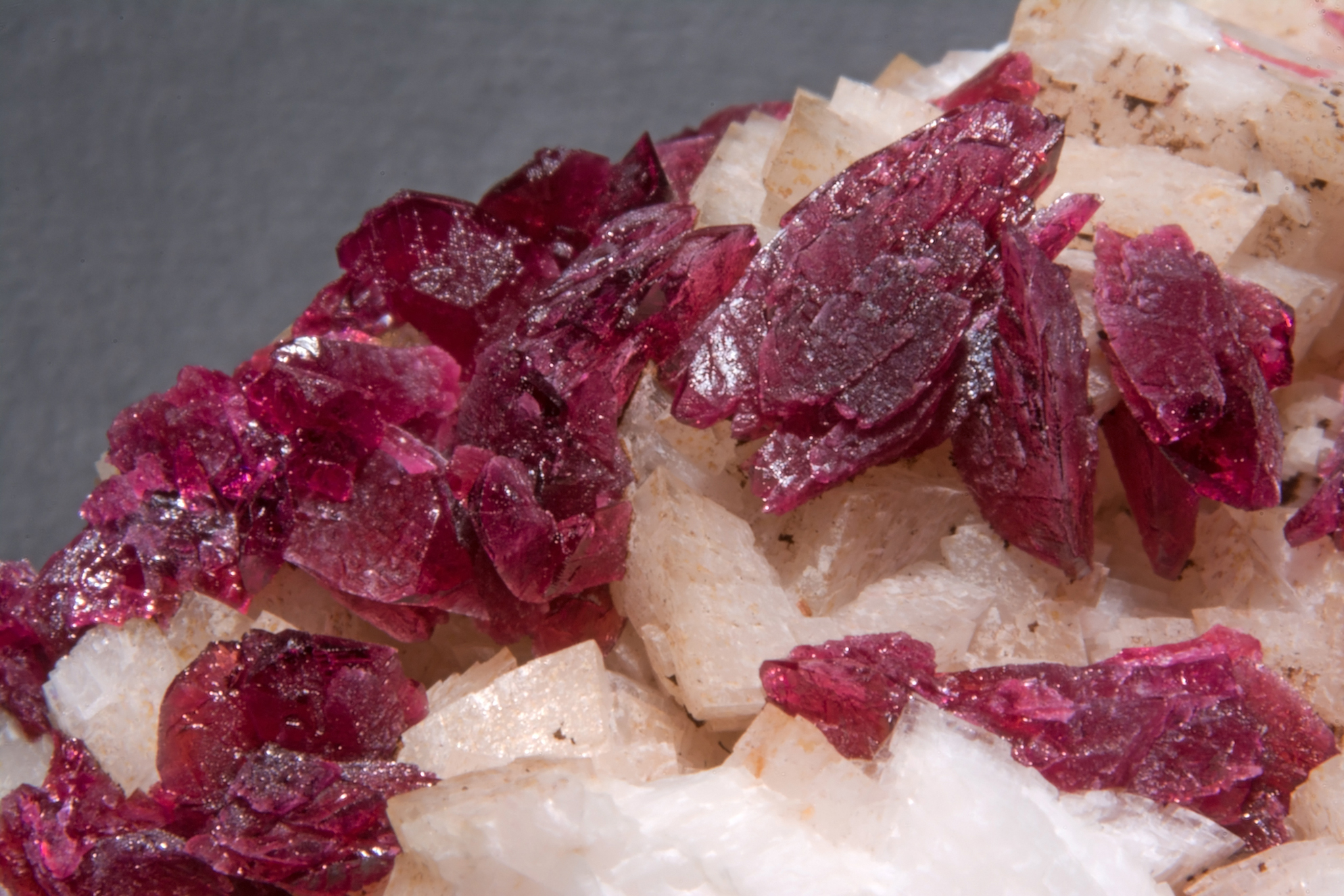
Roselite from Agoudal Centre Quarry, Ouarzazate Province, Souss-Massa-Draâ Region, Morocco

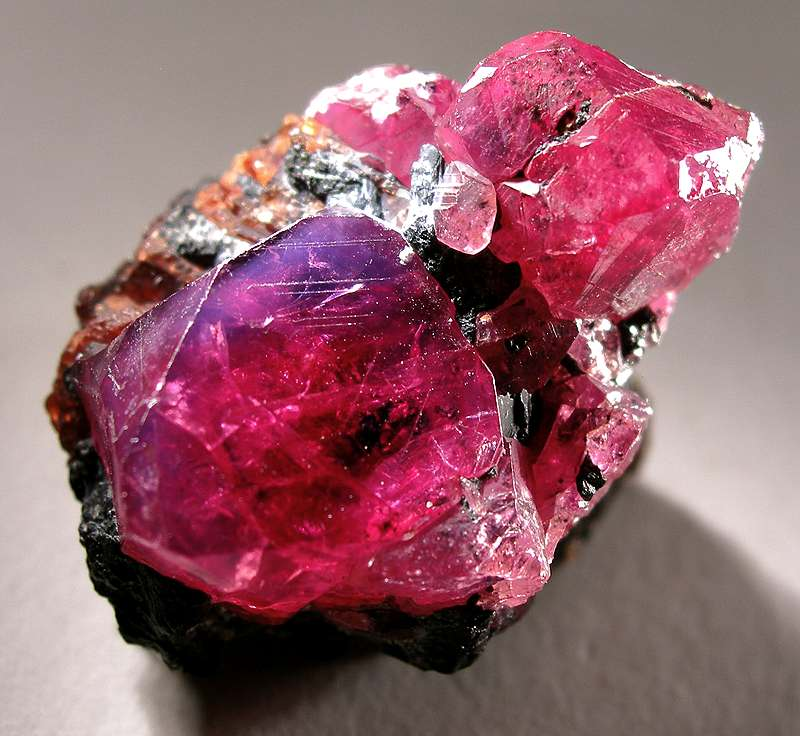
Two crystals of translucent, cherry red ruby in matrix

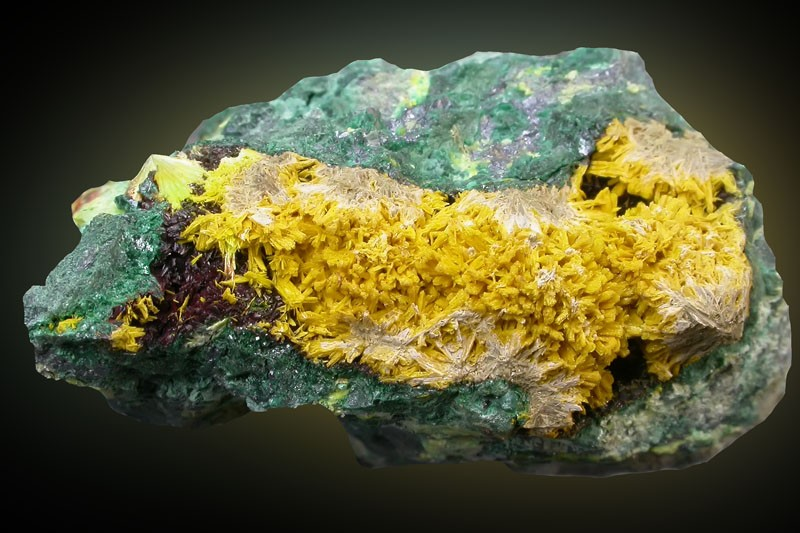
Rutherfordine from Musonoi Mine, Kolwezi, Western area, Katanga Copper Crescent, Katanga

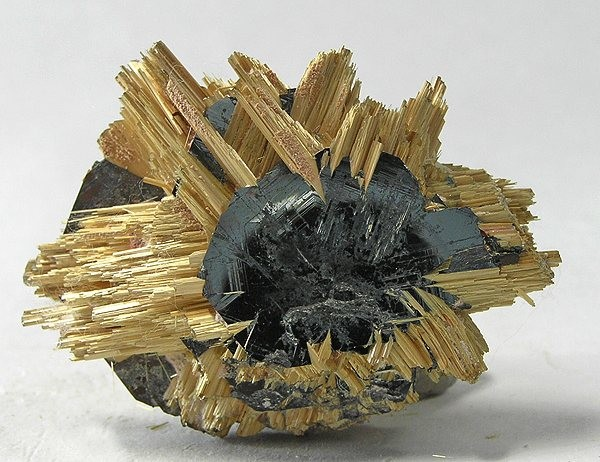
Golden acicular crystals of rutile radiating from a center of platy hematite

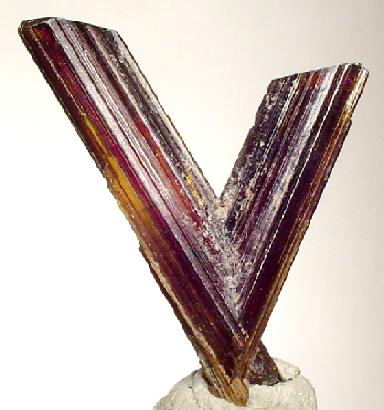
Rutile. Itambacuri, Doce valley, Minas Gerais, Southeast Region, Brazil

1. Raadeite (allactite: IMA1996-034) 8.BE.30 [no]
  (IUPAC: heptamagnesium octahydro diphosphate)
2. Rabbittite (Y: 1955) 5.ED.25
  (IUPAC: tricalcium trimagnesium diuranyl tetrahydro hexacarbonate octadecahydrate)
3. Rabejacite (zippeite: IMA1992-043) 7.EC.10
  (IUPAC: dicalcium [tetrauranyl tetraoxo disulfate] octawater)
4. Raberite (IMA2012-017) 2.0 [no] [no]
  (Tl_{5}Ag_{4}As_{6}SbS_{15})
5. Radekškodaite
  1. Radekškodaite-(Ce) (IMA2019-042) 9.B?. [no] [no]
  2. Radekškodaite-(La) (IMA2018-107) 9.B?. [no] [no]
6. Radhakrishnaite (IMA1983-082) 3.AA.50
  (IUPAC: lead tritelluride di(chloride,sulfide))
7. Radovanite (IMA2000-001) 8.CB.40 [no]
  (IUPAC: dicopper iron(III) arsenate [arsenic(V) tetraoxy][arsenic(III) dioxyhydro] monohydrate)
8. Radtkeite (IMA1989-030) 2.FC.15d
  (IUPAC: trimercury disulfide chloride iodide)
9. Radvaniceite (IMA2021-052) 2.EA. [no] [no]
  (IUPAC: germanium disulfide)
10. Raguinite (IMA1968-022) 2.CB.60
  (IUPAC: thallium iron disulfide)
11. Raisaite (tellurium oxysalt: IMA2014-046) 4.0 [no] [no]
  (IUPAC: copper magnesium dihydrotetraoxotellurate(VI) hexahydrate)
12. Raite (IMA1972-010) 9.EE.55
13. Rajite (tellurite: IMA1978-039) 4.JK.20
  (IUPAC: copper pentaoxoditellurate(IV))
14. Rakovanite (decavanadate: IMA2010-052) 8.0 [no]
  (IUPAC: trisodium {trihydrogen octaicosaoxodecavanadate} pentadecahydrate)
15. Ralphcannonite (routhierite: IMA2014-077) 2.0 [no] [no]
  (IUPAC: silver dizinc thallium hexasulfide diarsenide)
16. Ramaccioniite (IMA2018-082) 7.0 [no] [no]
  (IUPAC: tetracopper hexahydro selenate)
17. Ramanite 6.EA.10
  1. Ramanite-(Cs) (IMA2007-007) 6.EA.10 [no]
  2. Ramanite-(Rb) (IMA2007-006) 6.EA.10 [no]
18. Ramazzoite (IMA2017-090) 7.0 [no] [no]
19. Rambergite (würzite: IMA1995-028) 2.CB.45
  (IUPAC: manganese sulfide)
20. Ramdohrite (lillianite: 1930) 2.JB.40a
21. Rameauite (compreignacite: IMA1971-045) 4.GB.05
  (IUPAC: dipotassium calcium hexauranyl tetrahydro hexaoxide hexahydrate)
22. Ramikite-(Y) (IMA2009-021) 8.0 [no]
23. Rammelsbergite (löllingite: 1845) 2.EB.15a
  (IUPAC: nickel diarsenide)
24. Ramosite (IMA2019-099) 2.0 [no] [no]
25. Ramsbeckite (IMA1984-067) 7.DD.60
  (IUPAC: pentadecacopper docosahydro tetrasulfate hexahydrate)
26. Ramsdellite (ramsdellite: 1932) 4.DB.15a
  (IUPAC: manganese(IV) dioxide)
27. Ranciéite (Y: 1857) 4.FL.40
28. Rankachite (IMA1983-044) 7.GB.25
29. Rankamaite (IMA1968-002) 4.DM.05
30. Rankinite (Y: 1942) 9.BC.15
  (IUPAC: tricalcium heptaoxodisilicate)
31. Ransomite (Y: 1928) 7.CB.80
  (IUPAC: copper diiron(III) tetrasulfate hexahydrate)
32. Ranunculite (IMA1978-067) 8.EB.40
  (IUPAC: aluminium uranyl trihydro hydroxophosphate tetrahydrate)
33. Rapidcreekite (IMA1984-035) 7.DG.20
  (IUPAC: dicalcium sulfate carbonate tetrahydrate)
34. Rappoldite (tsumcorite: IMA1998-015) 8.CG.20 [no]
  (IUPAC: lead dicobalt diarsenate dihydrate)
35. Raslakite (eudialyte: IMA2002-067) 9.CO.10 [no]
36. Raspite (Y: 1897) 4.DG.20
  (IUPAC: lead tungsten tetraoxide)
37. Rastsvetaevite (eudialyte: IMA2000-028) 9.CO.10 [no]
38. Rasvumite (cubanite: IMA1970-028) 2.FB.20
  (IUPAC: potassium diiron trisulfide)
39. Rathite: sartorite group
  1. (Rathite-I) (sartorite: 1896) 2.HC.05d
  2. (Rathite-IV)^{Q} (sartorite: 1964) 2.0 [no] [no]
    (Ag_{x}Tl_{y}Pb_{16–2(x+y)}As_{16+x+y–z}Sb_{z}S_{40})
    Note: monoclinic phase with 140Å periodicity.
40. Rauchite (autunite: IMA2010-037) 8.EB.05 [no]
  (IUPAC: nickel diuranyl diarsenate decahydrate)
41. Rauenthalite (IMA1964-007) 8.CJ.40
  (IUPAC: tricalcium diarsenate decahydrate)
42. Rauvite^{Q} (decavanadate: 1922) 4.HB.40
  (IUPAC: calcium diuranyl decavanadate hexadecahydrate)
43. Ravatite (IMA1992-019) 10.BA.40
  (IUPAC: phenanthrene)
44. Raygrantite (iranite: IMA2013-001) 7.0 [no] [no]
  (IUPAC: decalead zinc hexasulfate ditetraoxosilicate dihydroxyl)
45. Rayite (IMA1982-029) 2.HC.10d
  ((Ag,Tl)_{2}Pb_{8}Sb_{8}S_{21})
46. Realgar (Y: 1747) 2.FA.15a
  (IUPAC: arsenic sulfide)
47. Reaphookhillite (IMA2018-128) 8.0 [no] [no]
  (IUPAC: magnesio dizinc diphosphate tetrahydrate)
48. Rebulite (IMA2008 s.p., 1982 Rd) 2.HD.25
  (Tl_{5}Sb_{5}As_{8}S_{22})
49. Rectorite (corrensite: IMA1967 s.p., 1891) 9.EC.60
  1. Rectorite-K: a 1:1 regular interstratification of muscovite/illite (dioctahedral mica) and montmorillonite (dioctahedral smectite).
  2. Rectorite-Na: a 1:1 regular interstratification of paragonite and montmorillonite.
50. Redcanyonite (zippeite: IMA2016-082) 7.0 [no] [no]
  (IUPAC: diammonium manganese [tetrauranyl tetraoxo disulfate] tetra(water))
51. Reddingite (reddingite: IMA1980 s.p., 1878 Rd) 8.CC.05
  (IUPAC: trimanganese(II) diphosphate trihydrate)
52. Redgillite (IMA2004-016) 7.DD.70
  (IUPAC: hexacopper decahydro sulfate monohydrate)
53. Redingtonite^{Q} (halotrichite: 1888) 7.CB.85
  (IUPAC: iron(II) dichromium tetrasulfate docosahydrate)
54. Redledgeite (hollandite, coronadite: IMA1967 s.p., 1928) 4.DK.05b
  (IUPAC: barium (hexatitanium dichromium(III)) hexadecaoxide)
55. Redmondite (IMA2021-072) 7.JA. [no] [no]
56. Redondite^{Q} (Y: 1869, 1967 s.p.) 8.CD.10 [no] [no]
  Note: possibly a variety of variscite.
57. Reederite-(Y) (IMA1994-012) 5.BF.20
  (IUPAC: pentadeca(sodium,manganese) diyttrium chloro nonacarbonate (fluorsulfate))
58. Reedmergnerite (feldspar: IMA1962 s.p., 1955) 9.FA.35
  (IUPAC: sodium boroctaoxotrisilicate)
59. Reevesite (hydrotalcite: MA1966-025) 5.DA.50
  (IUPAC: hexanickel diiron(III) hexadecahydro carbonate tetrahydrate)
60. Refikite (Y: 1852) 10.CA.05
61. Reichenbachite (IMA1985-044) 8.BD.05
  (IUPAC: pentacopper tetrahydro diphosphate)
62. Reidite (IMA2001-013) 9.AD.45 [no]
  (IUPAC: zirconium tetraoxosilicate)
63. Reinerite (Y: 1958) 4.JA.10
  (IUPAC: trizinc diarsenite)
64. Reinhardbraunsite (humite: IMA1980-032) 9.AF.45
  (IUPAC: pentacalcium ditetraoxosilicate dihydroxyl)
65. Relianceite-(K) (IMA2020-102) 8.DG. [no] [no]
66. Rémondite (burbankite) 5.AD.15
  1. Rémondite-(Ce) (IMA1987-035) 5.AD.15
  2. Rémondite-(La) (IMA1999-006) 5.AD.15
67. Renardite^{Q} (Y: 1928) 8.0 [no] [no]
  (IUPAC: lead tetrauranyl tetrahydro diphosphate heptahydrate)
68. Rengeite (chevkinite: IMA1998-055) 9.BE.70 [no]
  (IUPAC: tetrastrontium tetratitanium zirconium octaoxo diheptaoxodisilicate)
69. Renierite (germanite: IMA2007 s.p., 1948) 2.CB.35a
  ((Cu^{1+},Zn)_{11}Fe_{4}(Ge^{4+},As^{5+})_{2}S_{16})
70. Reppiaite (IMA1991-007) 8.BD.20
  (IUPAC: pentamanganese(II) tetrahydro divanadate)
71. Retgersite (Y: 1949) 7.CB.30
  (IUPAC: nickel sulfate hexahydrate)
72. Retzian 8.BM.05
  (IUPAC: dimanganese(II) REE tetrahydro arsenate)
  1. Retzian-(Ce) (IMA1982 s.p., 1894 Rd) 8.BM.05
  2. Retzian-(La) (IMA1983-077) 8.BM.05
  3. Retzian-(Nd) (IMA1982 s.p.) 8.BM.05
73. Revdite (IMA1979-082) 9.DM.30
74. Reyerite (gyrolite: 1906) 9.EE.35
75. Reynoldsite (IMA2011-051) 7.0 [no] [no]
  (IUPAC: dilead dimanganese(IV) pentaoxochromate)
76. Reznitskyite (IMA2021-067) [no] [no]

=== Rh – Ry ===
1. Rhabdoborite
  1. Rhabdoborite-(Mo) (IMA2019-114) 6.0 [no] [no]
  2. Rhabdoborite-(V) (IMA2017-108) 6.0 [no] [no]
  3. Rhabdoborite-(W) (IMA2017-109) 6.0 [no] [no]
2. Rhabdophane 8.CJ.45
  (IUPAC: REE phosphate monohydrate)
  1. Rhabdophane-(Ce) (IMA1987 s.p., 1885) 8.CJ.45
  2. Rhabdophane-(La) (IMA1987 s.p., 1883) 8.CJ.45
  3. Rhabdophane-(Nd) (IMA1966 s.p., 1951) 8.CJ.45
  4. Rhabdophane-(Y) (IMA2011-031) 8.CJ.45 [no]
3. Rheniite (IMA1999-004a) 2.EB.35 [no]
  (IUPAC: rhenium disulfide)
4. Rhenium^{D} (element: 1976) 1.AB.05 [no]
5. Rhodarsenide (IMA1996-030) 2.AC.25b [no]
  (IUPAC: dirhodium arsenide)
6. Rhodesite (rhodesite: 1957) 9.EB.05
7. Rhodium (element: IMA1974-012) 1.AF.10
8. Rhodizite (Y: 1834) 6.GC.05
  (IUPAC: potassium tetraberyllium tetralumino (beryllium undecaborate) octaicosaoxide)
9. Rhodochrosite (calcite: IMA1962 s.p., 1813) 5.AB.05
  (IUPAC: manganese carbonate)
10. Rhodonite (rhodonite: IMA1980 s.p., 1819) 9.DK.05
  (IUPAC: manganese(II) trioxosilicate)
11. Rhodostannite (spinel, linnaeite: IMA1968-018) 2.DA.10
  (IUPAC: di(copper,silver) iron octasulfide tristannide)
12. Rhodplumsite (IMA1982-043) 2.BE.15
  (IUPAC: trirhodium dilead disulfide)
13. Rhomboclase (Y: 1891) 7.CB.55
14. Rhönite (sapphirine: IMA2007 s.p., 1907) 9.DH.40
15. Ribbeite (humite: IMA1985-045) 9.AF.65
  (IUPAC: pentamanganese(II) di(tetraoxosilicate) dihydroxyl)
16. Richardsite (stannite: IMA2019-136) 2.0 [no] [no]
17. Richardsollyite (IMA2016-043) 2.0 [no] [no]
  (IUPAC: thallium lead sulfarsenite)
18. Richellite^{Q} (Y: 1883) 8.BB.90
  (IUPAC: calcium diron(III) diphosphate di(hydroxy,fluorine))
19. Richelsdorfite (IMA1982-019) 8.DK.
  (IUPAC: dicalcium pentacopper antimony(V) hexahydro chloro tetrarsenate hexahydrate)
20. Richetite (Y: 1947) 4.GB.15
21. Richterite [Na-Ca-amphibole: IMA2012 s.p., IMA1997 s.p., 1865] 9.DE.20
22. Rickardite (Y: 1903) 2.BA.30
  (Cu_{(3–x)}Te_{2})
23. Rickturnerite (IMA2010-034) 3.DB. [no]
  (IUPAC: heptalead tetraoxo [tetrahydroxy magnesium] hydroxytrichloride)
24. Riebeckite [Na-amphibole: IMA2012 s.p., IMA1997 s.p., 1888] 9.DE.25
25. Riesite (IMA2015-110a) 4.0 [no] [no]
  (IUPAC: titanium dioxide)
26. Rietveldite (IMA2016-081) 7.0 [no] [no]
  (IUPAC: iron uranyl disulfate pentawater)
27. Rilandite^{Q} (Y: 1933) 9.HB.10
28. Rimkorolgite (IMA1990-032) 8.CH.45
  (IUPAC: barium pentamagnesium tetraphosphate octahydrate)
29. Ringwoodite (spinel, ringwoodite: IMA1968-036) 9.AC.15
  (IUPAC: dimagnesium tetraoxosilicate)
30. Rinkite (seidozerite, rinkite) 9.00.20
  1. Rinkite-(Ce) (IMA2016 s.p., IMA2009-C, 1884) 9.00.20
  2. Rinkite-(Y) (IMA2017-043) 9.00.20 [no] [no]
31. Rinmanite (nolanite: IMA2000-036) 4.CB.40
  (IUPAC: dimagnesium tetrairon dizinc diantimony dihydro tetradecaoxide)
32. Rinneite (rinneite: 1909) 3.CJ.05
  (IUPAC: tripotassium sodium iron(II) hexachloride)
33. Riomarinaite (IMA2000-004) 7.DF.75
  (IUPAC: bismuth hydro sulfate monohydrate)
34. Ríosecoite (IMA2018-023) 8.0 [no] [no]
35. Riotintoite (IMA2015-085) 7.0 [no] [no]
  (IUPAC: aluminium hydro sulfate trihydrate)
36. Rippite (IMA2016-025) 9.0 [no] [no]
37. Rittmannite (whiteite: IMA1987-048) 8.DH.15
38. Rivadavite (IMA1966-010) 6.FA.20
  (IUPAC: hexasodium magnesium tetra[hexahydro heptaoxohexaborate] decahydrate)
39. Riversideite^{Q} (tobermorite: 1917) 9.DG.10
  (IUPAC: pentacalcium hexadecaoxohexasilicate dihydroxyl dihydrate)
40. Roaldite (nitride: IMA1980-079) 1.BC.05
  (IUPAC: tetra(iron,nickel) nitride)
41. Robertsite (arseniosiderite: IMA1973-024) 8.DH.30
  (IUPAC: dicalcium trimanganese(III) dioxotriphosphate trihydrate)
42. Robinsonite (Y: 1952) 2.HC.20
  (Pb_{4}Sb_{6}S_{13})
43. Rockbridgeite (rockbridgeite: 1949) 8.BC.10
  (IUPAC: iron(II) tetrairon(III) pentahydro triphosphate)
44. Rodalquilarite (tellurite: IMA1967-040) 4.JL.05
  (IUPAC: trihydrogen diron(III) chloro tetratellurate(IV))
45. Rodolicoite (quartz: IMA1995-038) 8.AA.05
  (IUPAC: iron(III) phosphate)
46. Roeblingite (Y: 1897) 9.CB.05
47. Roedderite (milarite: IMA1965-023) 9.CM.05
48. Rogermitchellite (IMA2003-019) 9.C [no]
49. Roggianite (zeolitic tectosilicate: IMA1968-015) 9.GB.20
50. Rohaite (IMA1973-043) 2.BD.35
  ((Tl,Pb,K)_{2}Cu_{8.7}Sb_{2}S_{4})
51. Rokühnite (IMA1979-036) 3.BB.10
  (IUPAC: iron dichloride dihydrate)
52. Rollandite (IMA1998-001) 8.CD.30
  (IUPAC: tricopper diarsenate tetrahydrate)
53. Romanèchite (IMA1982 s.p., 1900) 4.DK.10
54. Romanorlovite (IMA2014-011) 3.0 [no] [no]
  (IUPAC: undecapotassium nonacopper tetrahydro pentaicosachloride dihydrate)
55. Romarchite (IMA1969-006) 4.AC.20
  (IUPAC: tin oxide), anthropogenic
56. (Roméite group (A_{2}Sb_{2}O_{6}Y), pyrochlore supergroup )
57. Römerite (Y: 1858) 7.CB.75
  (IUPAC: iron(II) diron(III) tetrasulfate tetradecahydrate)
58. Rondorfite (IMA1997-013) 9.AB.20 [no]
  (IUPAC: octacalcium magnesium tetra(tetraoxosilicate) dichloride)
59. Rongibbsite (zeolitic aluminosilicate: IMA2010-055) 9.G [no] [no]
  (IUPAC: dilead (aluminotetrasilicate) undecaoxyhydroxyl)
60. Ronneburgite (IMA1998-069) 8.AC.75 [no]
  (IUPAC: dipotassium manganese dodecaoxotetravanadate)
61. Röntgenite-(Ce) (IMA1987 s.p., 1953) 5.BD.20d
  (IUPAC: dicalcium tricerium trifluoro pentacarbonate)
62. Rooseveltite (monazite: 1947) 8.AD.50
  (IUPAC: bismuth arsenate)
63. Roquesite (chalcopyrite: IMA1962-001) 2.CB.10a
  (IUPAC: copper indium disulfide)
64. Rorisite (matlockite: IMA1989-015) 3.DC.25
  (IUPAC: calcium chloride fluoride)
65. Rosasite (malachite: 1908) 5.BA.10
  (IUPAC: copper zinc dihydro carbonate)
66. Roscherite (roscherite: 1914) 8.DA.10
  (IUPAC: dicalcium pentamanganese(V) tetraberyllium tetrahydro pentaphosphate hexahydrate)
67. Roscoelite (mica: IMA1998 s.p., 1876) 9.EC.15
  (IUPAC: potassium divanadium(III) (aluminotrisilicate) decaoxydihydroxyl)
68. Roselite (roselite: 1824) 8.CG.10
  (IUPAC: dicalcium cobalt diarsenate dihydrate)
69. Rosemaryite (alluaudite, wyllieite: IMA1979 s.p.) 8.AC.15
  (IUPAC: vacancy sodium manganese(II) (iron(III) aluminium) triphosphate)
70. Rosenbergite (IMA1992-046) 3.CD.05
  (IUPAC: dialumino difluoride octa[fluoride water] dihydrate)
71. Rosenbuschite (seidozerite, rinkite: 1887) 9.BE.22
72. Rosenhahnite (IMA1965-030) 9.BJ.10
  (IUPAC: tricalcium octaoxotrisilicate dihydroxyl)
73. Roshchinite (lillianite: IMA1989-006) 2.JB.40a
  ((Ag,Cu)_{19}Pb_{10}Sb_{51}S_{96})
74. Rosiaite (IMA1995-021) 4.DH.25
  (IUPAC: lead ditin hexaoxide)
75. Rosickýite (Y: 1931) 1.CC.05
  (IUPAC: sulfur)
76. Rosièresite^{Q,H} (Y: 1841) 8.DF.10 [no]
  Note: an amorphous hydrous phosphate of Al with Pb and Cu.
77. Rossiantonite (IMA2012-056) 7.0 [no] [no]
  (IUPAC: trialuminium dihydro phosphate disulfate decawater tetrahydrate)
78. Rossite (Y: 1927) 4.HD.05
  (IUPAC: calcium di(trixovanadate) tetrahydrate)
79. Rösslerite (Y: 1861) 8.CE.20
  (IUPAC: magnesium hydroxoarsenate heptahydrate)
80. Rossmanite (tourmaline: IMA1996-018) 9.CK.05 [no]
81. Rossovskyite (columbite: IMA2014-056) 4.0 [no] [no]
82. Rostite (IMA1988 s.p., 1979 Rd) 7.DB.10
  (IUPAC: aluminium hydro sulfate pentahydrate)
83. Roterbärite (IMA2019-043) 2.0 [no] [no]
84. Rouaite (nitrate: IMA1999-010) 5.NB.05
  (IUPAC: dicopper trihydro nitrate)
85. Roubaultite (IMA1970-030) 5.EA.25
  (IUPAC: dicopper dioxo triuranyl dihydro dicarbonate tetrahydrate)
86. Roumaite (mosandrite: IMA2008-024) 9.B [no]
87. Rouseite (IMA1984-071) 4.JC.15
  (IUPAC: dilead manganese(II) diarsenate dihydrate)
88. Routhierite (routhierite: IMA1973-030) 2.GA.40
  (IUPAC: copper thallium dimercury hexasulfide diarsenide)
89. Rouvilleite (IMA1989-050) 5.BC.10
  (IUPAC: trisodium calcium manganese(II) fluoro tricarbonate)
90. Rouxelite (IMA2002-062) 2.JB.25j
  (Cu_{2}HgPb_{22}Sb_{28}S_{64}(O,S)_{2})
91. Roweite (Y: 1937) 6.DA.25
  (IUPAC: dicalcium dimanganese(II) hexahydro heptaoxotetraborate)
92. Rowlandite-(Y) (IMA1987 s.p., 1891) 9.HG.20
  (IUPAC: iron(II) tetrayttrium di(heptaoxodisilicate) difluoride)
93. Rowleyite (IMA2016-037) 4.0 [no] [no]
94. Roxbyite (IMA1986-010) 2.BA.05
  (IUPAC: nonacopper pentasulfide)
95. Roymillerite (molybdophyllite: IMA2016-061) 09.H [no] [no]
96. Rozenite (starkeyite: IMA1963 s.p., IMA1962-006 Rd) 7.CB.15
  (IUPAC: iron(II) sulfate tetrahydrate)
97. Rozhdestvenskayaite-(Zn) (tetrahedrite: IMA2018-K, IMA2016-094) 2.0 [no] [no]
  (Ag_{10}Zn_{2}Sb_{4}S_{13})
98. Rruffite (roselite: IMA2009-077) 8.CG.10 [no] [no]
  (IUPAC: dicalcium copper diarsenate dihydrate)
99. Ruarsite (arsenopyrite: IMA1980 s.p., 1979) 2.EB.20
  (IUPAC: ruthenium sulfarsenide)
100. Rubicline (feldspar: IMA1996-058) 9.FA.30 [no]
  (IUPAC: rubidium (aluminoctaoxotrisilicate))
101. Rubinite (garnet: IMA2016-110) 9.A [no] [no]
  (IUPAC: tricalcium dititanium(III) dodecaoxotrisilicate)
102. Rucklidgeite (aleksite: IMA1975-029) 2.GC.40c
  (IUPAC: lead dibismuth tetratelluride)
103. Rudabányaite (IMA2016-088) 8.0 [no] [no]
  (IUPAC: (disilver dimercury) chloro arsenate)
104. Rudashevskyite (sphalerite: IMA2005-017) 2.CB.05a [no]
  (IUPAC: (iron,zinc) sulfide)
105. Rudenkoite (IMA2003-060) 9.HA.50
106. Rüdlingerite (IMA2016-054a) 4.0 [no] [no]
  (IUPAC: dimanganese(II) heptaoxovanadate(V)arsenate(V) dihydrate)
107. Rudolfhermannite (zemannite: IMA2021-099) 4.JM. [no] [no]
108. Ruifrancoite (roscherite: IMA2005-061a) 8.DA.10 [no]
109. Ruitenbergite (IMA1992-011) 6.GD.05
110. Ruizite (ruizite: IMA1977-007) 9.BJ.35
111. Rumoiite (tin alloy: IMA2018-161) 1.0 [no] [no]
  (IUPAC: gold ditin alloy)
112. Rumseyite (IMA2011-091) 3.0 [no] [no]
  (IUPAC: [dilead oxofluoride] chloride)
113. Rusakovite (IMA1962 s.p., 1960) 8.DF.15
  (IUPAC: penta(iron,aluminium) nonahydro divanadate trihydrate)
114. Rusinovite (IMA2010-072) 9.B [no] [no]
  (IUPAC: decacalcium tri(heptaoxodisilicate) dichlorine)
115. Russellite (Y: 1938) 4.DE.15
  (IUPAC: dibismuth hexaoxotungstate)
116. Russoite (IMA2015-105) 4.0 [no] [no]
  (IUPAC: diammonium dichlorine hexaoxotetraarsenate water)
117. Rustenburgite (auricupride: IMA1974-040) 1.AG.10
  (IUPAC: triplatinum tin alloy)
118. Rustumite (IMA1964-004) 9.BG.30
  (IUPAC: decacalcium di(heptaoxodisilicate) tetrasilicate dihydroxyl dichlorine)
119. Ruthenarsenite (modderite: IMA1973-020) 2.CC.15
  (IUPAC: (ruthenium,nickel) arsenide)
120. Rutheniridosmine (alloy: IMA1973 s.p., 1936 Rd) 1.AF.05
  (Ir,Os,Ru)
121. Ruthenium (element: IMA1974-013) 1.AF.05
122. Rutherfordine (IMA1962 s.p., 1906) 5.EB.05
  (IUPAC: uranyl carbonate)
123. Rutile (rutile: 1800) 4.DB.05
  (IUPAC: titanium(IV) oxide)
124. Ryabchikovite (pyroxene: IMA2021-011) [no] [no]
  (IUPAC: copper magnesium hexaoxodisilicate)
125. Rynersonite (aeschynite: IMA1974-058) 4.DF.05
  (IUPAC: calcium ditantalum hexaoxide)
