= Tsumebite =

Rare phosphate mineral

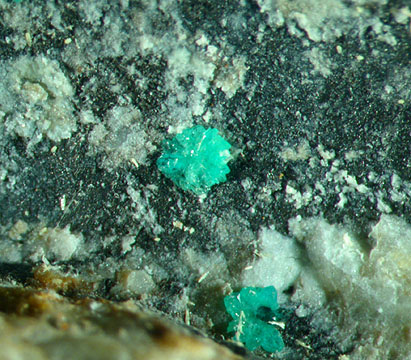
- Tsumebite from the Bluebell Claims, California, US.

General
- Category: Phosphate minerals
- Formula: Pb_{2}Cu(PO_{4})(SO_{4})(OH)
- IMA symbol: Tsu
- Strunz classification: 8.BG.05
- Dana classification: 43.4.2.1
- Crystal system: Monoclinic
- Crystal class: Prismatic (2/m) (same H-M symbol)
- Space group: P2_{1}/m

Identification
- Formula mass: 685.99 g/mol
- Color: Emerald-green, green in transmitted light
- Crystal habit: Crusts of intergrown crystals on matrix
- Twinning: Almost always twinned. Twins may be multiple, with serrated re-entrants.
- Cleavage: None
- Fracture: Uneven
- Tenacity: Brittle
- Mohs scale hardness: 3 1/2
- Luster: Adamantine to vitreous
- Streak: Green
- Diaphaneity: Transparent
- Specific gravity: 6.13
- Optical properties: Biaxial (+)
- Refractive index: N_{x} = 1.885 to 1.900, N_{y} = 1.920, N_{z} = 1.942 to 1.956
- Pleochroism: Faint: X = Y = very pale blue to colorless; Z = robin’s-egg-blue
- Solubility: Readily soluble in HCl and slowly soluble in HNO_{3}.

Tsumebite is a rare phosphate mineral named in 1912 after the locality where it was first found, the Tsumeb mine in Namibia, well known to mineral collectors for the wide range of minerals found there. Tsumebite is a compound phosphate and sulfate of lead and copper, with hydroxyl, formula Pb_{2}Cu(PO_{4})(SO_{4})(OH). There is a similar mineral called arsentsumebite, where the phosphate group PO_{4} is replaced by the arsenate group AsO_{4}, giving the formula Pb_{2}Cu(AsO_{4})(SO_{4})(OH). Both minerals are members of the brackebuschite group.

== The brackebuschite group ==
The minerals in the brackebuschite group have the general formula A_{2}B(H_{2}O,OH)(TO_{4})_{2} and crystallise in the monoclinic system, space group P2_{1}/m. The group includes:

- brackebuschite Pb_{2}Mn^{3+}(VO_{4})_{2}(OH)
- arsenbrackebuschite Pb_{2}(Fe^{3+},Zn)(AsO_{4})_{2}(OH,H_{2}O)
- gamagarite Ba_{2}Fe^{3+}(VO_{4})_{2}(OH)
- goedkenite Sr_{2}Al(PO_{4})_{2}(OH)
- bearthite Ca_{2}Al(PO_{4})_{2}OH
- tsumebite Pb_{2}Cu(PO_{4})(SO_{4})(OH)
- arsentsumebite Pb_{2}Cu(AsO_{4})(SO_{4})(OH)
- vauquelinite Cu^{2+}Pb_{2}(CrO_{4})(PO_{4})(OH)
- fornacite CuPb_{2}(CrO_{4})(AsO_{4})(OH)
- molybdofornacite CuPb_{2}MoO_{4}AsO_{4}(OH)

== Structure ==
The structure of the brackebuschite group minerals is composed of B-(O,OH)_{6} octahedra, two non-equivalent TO_{4} tetrahedra, TO_{4}(1) and TO_{4}(2), and two different irregular polyhedra of large cations. B and T represent different elements in different members of the group. Chains formed from the B octahedra link through the oxygens of TO_{4}(2) tetrahedra, while the large cation polyhedra form double chains parallel to the b crystal axis through edge sharing with TO_{4}(1) tetrahedra. The result is a tight three-dimensional structure. In tsumebite copper ions occupy the B sites, and phosphorus and sulfur occupy the T sites. Lead is the large cation.

== Unit cell ==
Tsumebite belongs to the monoclinic crystal class 2/m, meaning that it has one twofold axis of symmetry perpendicular to a mirror plane. The space group is P 2_{1}/m, meaning that the crystal lattice is a primitive lattice, with structural elements only at the vertices of the unit cell. These structural elements are made up of two formula units (Z = 2).
Unit cell parameters are a = 8.69 Å, b = 5.78 Å, c = 7.86 Å, β = 111.87° or a = 8.70 Å, b = 5.80 Å, c = 7.85 Å, β = 111.5°.

== Optical properties ==
Tsumebite is an emerald-green color, transparent and green in transmitted light, with a green streak and an adamantine (diamond-like) to vitreous (glassy) luster. It is biaxial (+) with refractive indices N_{x} = 1.885 to 1.900, N_{y} = 1.920 and N_{z} = 1.942 to 1.956. It is faintly pleochroic with X = Y = very pale blue to colorless and Z = robin's-egg-blue.

== Physical properties ==
The mineral typically occurs as crusts of intergrown crystals on matrix. Cleavage is absent, but twinning is almost universal, and twins may be multiple, with serrated re-entrants. It is brittle, with an uneven fracture, hardness 3 1/2 and specific gravity 6.13. It is readily soluble in hydrochloric acid HCl and slowly soluble in nitric acid HNO_{3}. It is not radioactive.

== Environment ==
Tsumebite is a rare secondary mineral in the oxidised zone of some arsenic-bearing lead-copper deposits, with other lead-bearing phosphates and sulfates. Associated minerals include azurite, smithsonite, malachite, cerussite, mimetite, wulfenite and olivenite. The type locality is the Tsumeb mine, Tsumeb, Otjikoto Region, Namibia. The Handbook of Mineralogy states that the type material was destroyed by bombing, but does not indicate when or where.

Tsumebite occurs at Morenci, Arizona, predominantly as twinned crystals associated with wulfenite, olivenite and the hyalite variety of opal. At Broken Hill, New South Wales, Australia, tsumebite has been found as lustrous pale blue to bluish green crystals. It usually occurs with yellow crusts of corkite-hinsdalite, colorless to white pyromorphite needles and sprays of pale greyish green zincian libethenite. Less commonly found with scholzite and torbernite.
