= Murdochite =

Mineral combining lead and copper oxides

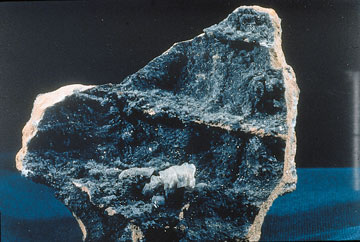

General
- Category: Halide minerals
- Formula: PbCu_{6}O_{8−x}(Cl,Br)_{2x} (x ≤ 0.5)
- IMA symbol: Mdh
- Strunz classification: 3.DB.45
- Crystal system: Cubic
- Crystal class: Hexoctahedral (m3̅m); H-M symbol: (4/m 3̅ 2/m)
- Space group: Fm3̅m

Identification

Murdochite is a mineral combining lead and copper oxides with the chemical formula PbCu_{6}O_{8−x}(Cl,Br)_{2x} (x ≤ 0.5).

It was first discovered in 1953 in the Mammoth-Saint Anthony Mine in Pinal County, Arizona by Percy W. Porter, a mining engineer who handpicked a 401.5-mg sample. Porter would later submit for analysis and it was then that Fred A. Hildebrand suggested that the sample was a new mineral after taking a powder x-ray picture. It was named for Joseph Murdoch (1890–1973), American mineralogist. Murdochite was first suggested to be of a cubic structure. After this suggestion, the term "murdochite-type structure" began to be used when describing a structure that is similar to that of murdochite. Murdochite was later found to be octahedral.

== Composition ==
Various studies have examined the composition of murdochite. When murdochite was first discovered, its chemical formula was determined through stoichiometry to be Cu_{6}·1Pb0·9O_{8}·O. The ideal formula for murdochite was originally thought to be Cu_{6}PbO_{8}. This formula failed to take into consideration the significant amounts of chlorine and bromine present in murdochite. Using electron microprobe analysis, a new chemical composition for murdochite was determined that included chlorine and bromine. This new formula was Cu_{6+x}Pb_{+x}(O,Cl,Br)_{8} and was created with regard to the Cu/Pb variance observed in samples of murdochite from both Hansonburg, New Mexico, and T. Khuni mine, Iran. This new composition was also proven incorrect and the formula that is widely accepted today, PbCu_{6}O_{8−x}(Cl,Br)_{2x} (x ≤ 0.5), was proposed.

== Structure ==
The structure originally proposed for murdochite was a simple cubic structure. This structure was later proven incorrect and determined to be octahedral. The structure of murdochite is described as edges of [PbO_{8}] cubes spanned by Cu^{2+} ions that give a square-planar CuO_{4} arrangement in a three-dimensional network. Halogen ions complete a (4 + 2_ elongated CuO_{4}(Cl,Br)_{2} octahedron.

== Physical properties ==
Murdochite is an opaque mineral that exhibits a black color, adamantine luster, black streak, and isotropic optical class. Samples from T. Khuni mine indicate that polished sections of murdochite resemble the color and reflectivity of magnetite but vary because of zoning. The lighter zones in murdochite are caused because they are richer in lead than the darker zones. The mineral is known to be brittle, have a hardness of 4, and have {111} cleavage. Murdochite also has a pink tinge that is distinctive and its edges seem to be more reflective than the center because samples are commonly porous in the center and compact on the sides with clean-cut faces. The space group of murdochite has been confirmed to be Fm3m. Murdochite can be cubic, with a point group of 4/m 3 2/m, or octahedral and cubo-octahedral whose point group is 2 mm. Murdochite can occur in the forms (100) and (111) with crystal twinning being very common. The calculated density of murdochite was determined to be 6.1 g/cm^{3} and have a measured density of 6.47 g/cm^{3}.

== Geologic occurrence ==
Naturally occurring murdochite, PbCu_{6}O_{8−x}(Cl,Br)_{2x} (x ≤ 0.5), was discovered in Mammoth Mine, Arizona. The mine, about 46 miles northeast of Tucson, contains deposits of molybdenum, lead, gold, zinc, vanadium, sphalerite, and galena. In this mine, murdochite was found embedded in plates of wulfenite as well as on the surface of crystals of fluorite. Other crystals found in Mammoth Mine include hemimorphite, willemite, and quartz. Larger masses of murdochite have also been found at the T. Kguni Mine in Anarak, Iran. Here murdochite was found in conjunction with khuniite (iranite), chrominium (phoenicochroite), plumangite and an unknown mineral with the formula Pb_{9}O_{16}. All these minerals are lead oxide minerals, meaning that murdochite can be found in oxidized Pb-Cu deposits. More recently, small murdochite crystals were found encrusting aurichalcite crystals in the Granite Gap Mines in New Mexico.

== Origin of the name ==
The mineral murdochite is named after Joseph Murdoch, who was once a professor of geology at the University of California, Los Angeles and a past president of the Mineralogical Society of America. Professor Murdoch was born February 19, 1890, and died December 31, 1973, at 83 years of age. Murdoch obtained a baccalaureate degree, an M.S. and a Ph.D. in geologic science by 1915 from Harvard University and would first be involved in a non-geological business career before joining the faculty at the department of geology at the University of California, Los Angeles in 1928. It was here that Murdoch returned to work in the geologic field that would lead to the publishing of numerous papers which would include 23 publications ranging from the years 1913–1968, along with ten published abstracts and many book reviews.

== See also ==
- List of minerals
- List of minerals named after people
