= Hemihedrite =

Rare lead zinc chromate silicate mineral

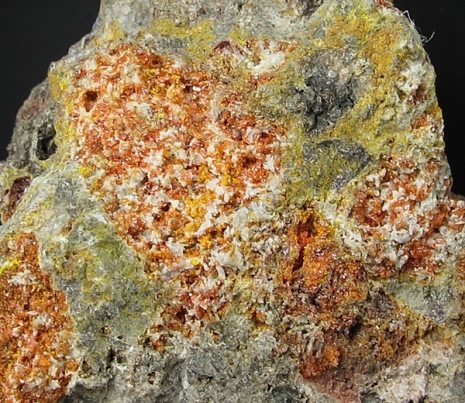
- Red phoenicochroite and orange hemihedrite microcrystals richly cover the matrix

General
- Category: Chromate mineral
- Formula: Pb_{10}Zn(CrO_{4})_{6}(SiO_{4})_{2}(F,OH)_{2}
- IMA symbol: Hhe
- Strunz classification: 7.FC.15
- Crystal system: Triclinic
- Space group: P1̅ (No. 2)
- Unit cell: a = 9.49, b = 11.44 c = 10.84 [Å]; α = 120.5° β = 92.1°, γ = 55.83°; Z = 1

Identification
- Color: Bright orange, henna-brown, to almost black
- Crystal habit: Euhedral crystals with hemihedral morphology
- Twinning: Present
- Mohs scale hardness: 3
- Luster: Vitreous
- Streak: Saffron-yellow
- Diaphaneity: Translucent to transparent
- Specific gravity: 6.42
- Optical properties: Biaxial (+)
- Refractive index: n_{α} = 2.105 n_{β} = 2.320 n_{γ} = 2.650
- Birefringence: δ = 0.545
- Pleochroism: Feeble, yellow to orange
- 2V angle: 88° (measured)

Hemihedrite is a rare lead zinc chromate silicate mineral with formula Pb_{10}Zn(CrO_{4})_{6}(SiO_{4})_{2}(F,OH)_{2}. It forms a series with the copper analogue iranite.

== Discovery and occurrence ==
Hemihedrite was first described in 1967 for occurrences in the Florence lead silver mine in the Ripsey District, Tortilla Mountains, Pinal County, Arizona, US. It was named for the hemihedral morphology of its crystals.

It occurs in oxidized veins containing galena, sphalerite and pyrite. Associated secondary minerals include cerussite, phoenicochroite, vauquelinite, willemite, wulfenite, galena, sphalerite, pyrite, tennantite and chalcopyrite. It has been reported from several mining districts in Arizona and one in Nevada. It has also been reported from the Antofagasta Region of Chile and the Anarak District of Esfahan Province, Iran.
