= Fornacite =

Rare lead, copper chromate arsenate hydroxide mineral

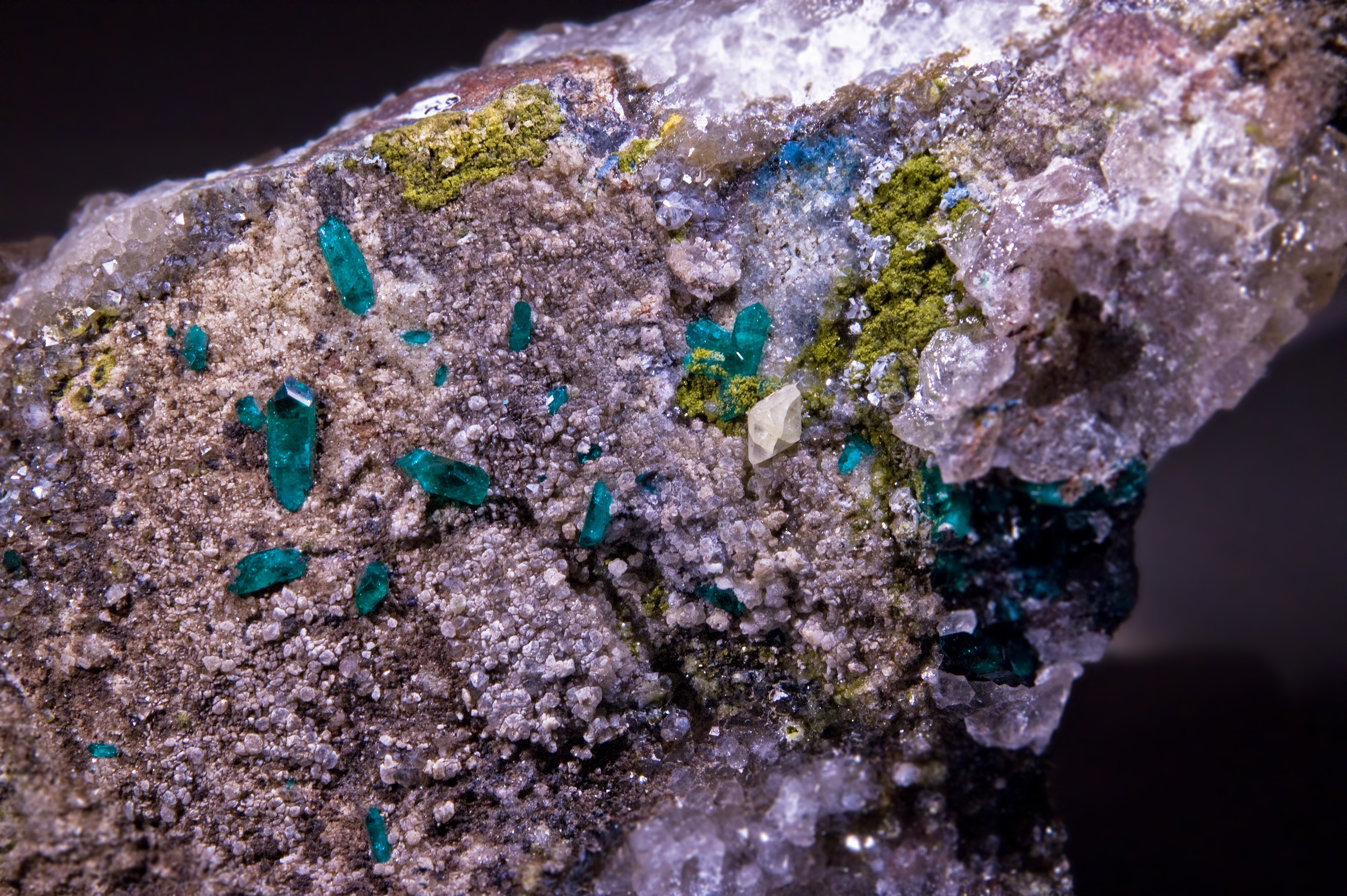
- Dioptase (blue green), cerussite (light pink) and fornacite (green) from Renéville, Djoué, Brazzaville Region, Republic of Congo

General
- Category: Arsenate mineral
- Formula: Pb_{2}Cu(CrO_{4})(AsO_{4})(OH)
- IMA symbol: For
- Strunz classification: 7.FC.10
- Dana classification: 43.4.3.2
- Crystal system: Monoclinic
- Crystal class: Prismatic (2/m) (same H-M symbol)
- Space group: P2_{1}/c
- Unit cell: a = 8.101(2), b = 5.893(11), c = 17.547(9) [Å]; β = 110.00(4)°; Z = 4

Identification
- Color: Deep olive-green
- Crystal habit: Aggregates of steep pyramidal to bladed, rounded crystals
- Fracture: Irregular/uneven, conchoidal, sub-conchoidal
- Tenacity: Brittle
- Mohs scale hardness: 2–3
- Luster: Resinous, waxy, greasy
- Streak: Olive green
- Diaphaneity: Transparent
- Density: 6.27 g/cm^{3}
- Optical properties: Biaxial (+)
- Refractive index: n_{α} = 2.142 n_{γ} = 2.242
- Birefringence: δ = 0.100
- 2V angle: Large

Fornacite is a rare lead, copper chromate arsenate hydroxide mineral with the formula: Pb_{2}Cu(CrO_{4})(AsO_{4})(OH). It forms a series with the phosphate mineral vauquelinite. It forms variably green to yellow, translucent to transparent crystals in the monoclinic – prismatic crystal system. It has a Mohs hardness of 2.3 and a specific gravity of 6.27.

It was first described in 1915 and named after Lucien Lewis Forneau (1867–1930) the governor of the French Congo. Its type locality is in Reneville, Republic of Congo.

It occurs in the oxidized zone of ore deposits and is associated with dioptase, wulfenite, hemihedrite, phoenicochroite, duftite, mimetite, shattuckite, chrysocolla, hemimorphite, willemite and fluorite.
