= Raygrantite =

Sulfate mineral

General
- Category: Minerals
- Formula: Pb_{10}Zn(SO_{4})_{6}(SiO_{4})_{2}(OH)_{2}
- Crystal system: Triclinic
- Crystal class: 1̅ – Pinacoidal
- Space group: P1̅
- Unit cell: a = 9.3175(4) Å, b = 11.1973(5) Å c = 10.08318(5) Å;

Identification
- Formula mass: 2888
- Color: No color
- Crystal habit: Bladed crystals
- Twinning: Fishtail twining axis along [121̅] – twin axis along [010]
- Cleavage: Good along {120}
- Fracture: Uneven
- Tenacity: Brittle
- Mohs scale hardness: 3
- Luster: Vitreous
- Streak: White
- Diaphaneity: Transparent
- Density: 6.374 g/cm^{3}
- Optical properties: Biaxial positive
- Refractive index: n_{α} = 1.915(7) n_{β} = 1.981(7) n_{γ} = 2.068(9)
- Birefringence: δ = 0.153
- Dispersion: v < r strong
- Absorption spectra: Z>Y>X
- Solubility: Insoluble in water, acetone, and hydrochloric acid

Raygrantite is a mineral first discovered in Big Horn Mountains, Maricopa County, Arizona, US. More specifically, it is located in the evening star mine, which is a Cu, V, Pb, Ag, Au, and W mine. Raygrantite is a member of the iranite mineral group, which consists of hemihedrite, iranite, and raygrantite. This mineral received its name in honor of Raymond W. Grant, a retired professor who primarily focused on the minerals of Arizona. The typical crystal structure of raygrantite is bladed with parallel striations to the C axis. Its ideal chemical formula is Pb_{10}Zn(SO_{4})_{6}(SiO_{4})_{2}(OH)_{2}. The IMA (International Mineralogical Association) approved raygrantite in 2013, and the first publication regarding this mineral was put forth in 2017.

== Occurrence ==
Raygrantite is associated with cerussite, galena, mattheddleite, lanarkite, leadhillite, anglesite, alamosite, hydrocerussite, diaboleite, and caledonite. Crystals were found in pockets encased in masses of galena. Raygrantite is a secondary mineral and is the result of pyrite-galena-chalcopyrite veins. In this district of the Rocky Mountains, intrusions can date back to the late Cretaceous period.

== Physical properties ==
Raygrantite is a colorless, transparent mineral that occurs in bladed crystal structures. This bladed structure has striations parallel to the C-axis. Its luster is vitreous, which means it looks similar to glass. Raygrantite on the Mohs hardness scale is a three, which is .5 softer than a penny. It exhibits brittle tenacity and has good cleavage along the {120} plain. This mineral also has characteristic fishtail twinning along the {121̅} in addition to a twin axis along the {010}. This mineral's recorded density is 6.374 g/cm^{3}.

== Optical properties ==
Raygrantite is transparent with a vitreous luster. It is biaxial positive, which means it will refract light along two axes. The mineral's 2V_{meas.} 76° (2) and 2V_{calc.} 85°. The refractive indices are: nα= 1.915(7) nβ= 1.981(7) nγ= 2.068(9). Dispersion is strong, v < r. Raygrantite also exhibits absorption spectra of Z>Y>X.

== Chemical structure ==
Raygrantite is isotypic with iranite and hemihedrite. When looking at the chemical structure of the iranite mineral group, there are 10 symmetrically independent non-H cation sites. Of these sites, five are filled by lead Pb2þ (Pb1, Pb2, Pb3, Pb4, and Pb5). Then three are filled by S6þ (S1, S2, and S3). Finally, one of the sites is filled by Si4þ, and the last is filled by Zn2þ. Raygrantite is composed of layers of tetrahedron and octahedron joined by lead ions.

== Chemical composition ==
Oxide	wt%
SiO_{2}	4.30
SO_{3}	16.49
PbO	74.91
ZnO	2.59
H_{2}O	[0.62]
Total	98.81

== X-ray crystallography ==
To collect this data, a Bruker X8 APEX2 CCD X-ray diffractometer equipped with graphite-monochromatized MoKa radiation was used. Through these analyses, we can understand that Raygrantite is a member of the triclinic crystal system. It was also noted that the space group of this mineral is 1̅ – Pinacoidal. The next conclusion that can be drawn from the X-ray diffraction data is the unit cell dimensions. These are as such: a = 9.3175(4) Å, b = 11.1973(5) Å
c = 10.08318(5) Å.

== See also ==
- List of minerals
