= Beryozovskoye deposit =

Mine in Russia

Coordinates: 56.9114°N 60.7931°E

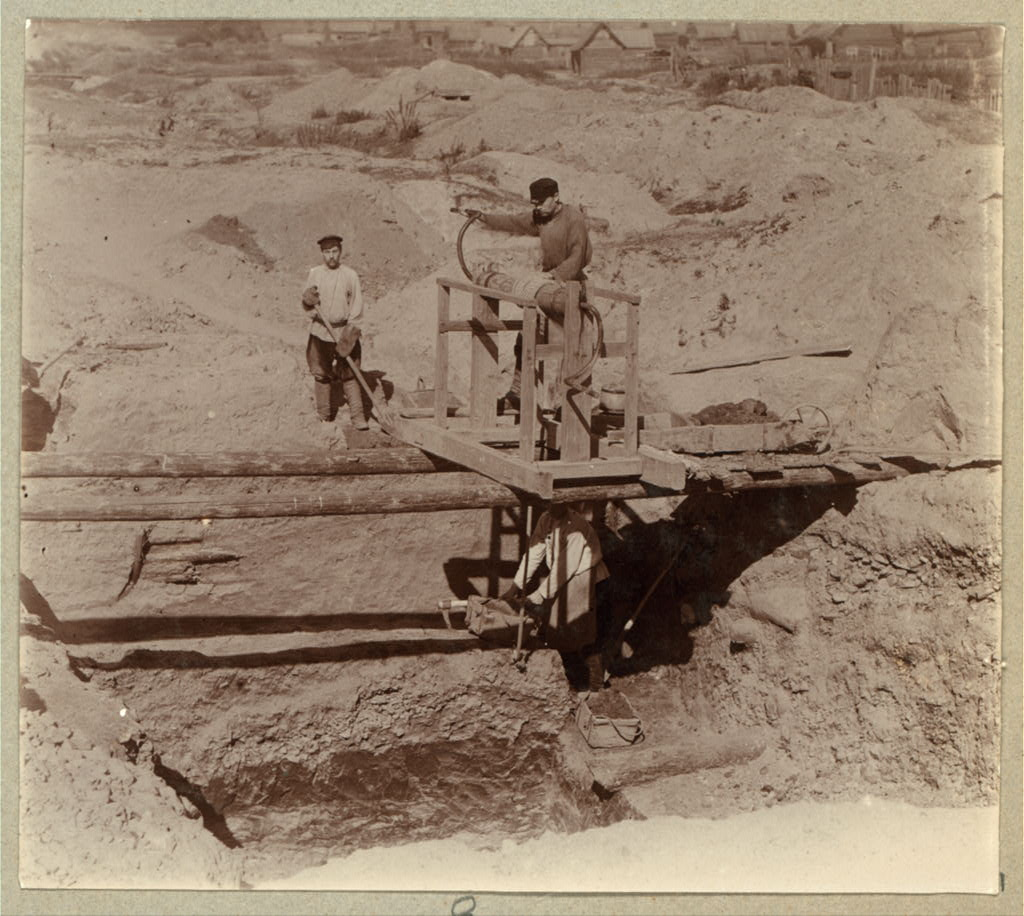
Recovery of gold-bearing sand in 1910 near Berezovsky

Beryozovskoye deposit, Berezovskoe gold deposit, Berezovsky deposit, Berezovsk Mines, and some other names (Russian: Берёзовское месторождение) is the first known to primary deposit of gold in Russia. It is located 13 km northwest of Yekaterinburg in the central Urals Federal District. It was discovered in 1745 by a raskolnik Yerofey Markov. The first mine was established in 1747. The deposit is named after the Beryozovka River (a tributary of Pyshma River) and is associated with the settlement of Berezovsky, now the town of Beryozovsky, Sverdlovsk Oblast.

The following minerals were discovered at the deposit: aikinite (1789), vauquelinite (1819), cassedanneite (1988), crocoite (1766), pyrophyllite (1829), phenicochroite (1839), embreyite (1972).

The discovery of crocoite by Johann Gottlob Lehmann in 1766 at the Berezovsk Mines was the starting point of the discovery of the element chromium. Berezovsk Mines were for a long time the only source for crocoite and therefore the only source of the pigment chrome yellow.
