= Iranite =

Triclinic lead copper chromate mineral

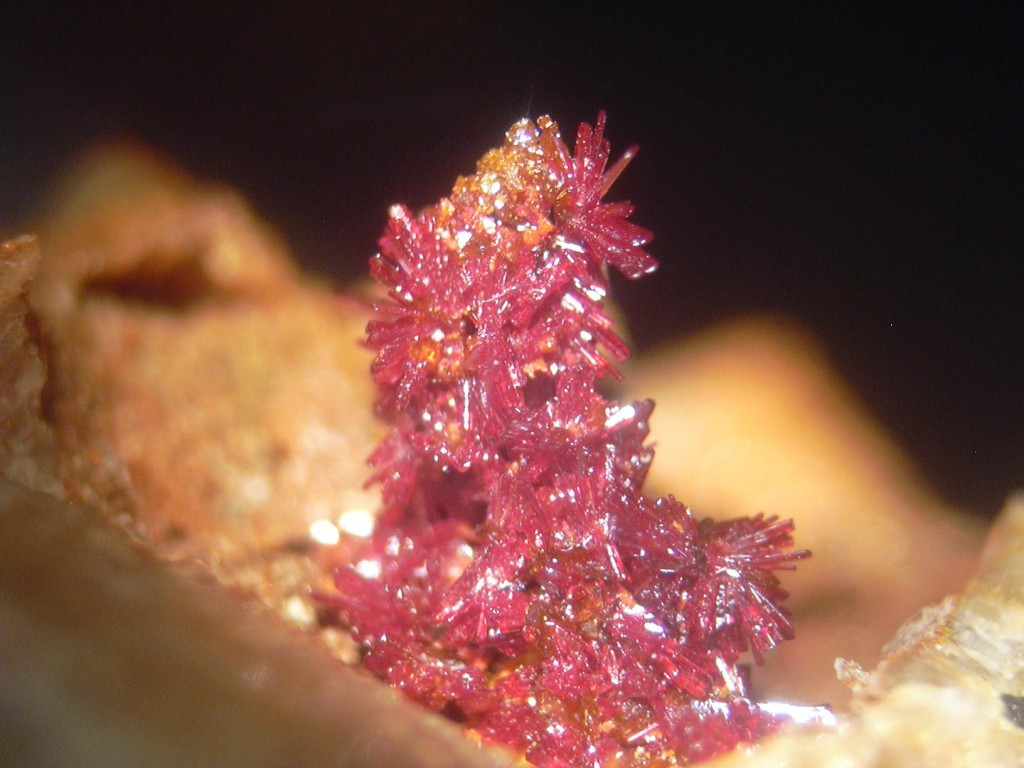

General
- Category: Chromate minerals
- Formula: Pb_{10}Cu(CrO_{4})_{6}(SiO_{4})_{2}(F,OH)_{2}
- IMA symbol: Irn
- Strunz classification: 7.FC.15
- Crystal system: Triclinic
- Space group: Triclinic pedial H-M symbol: (1); Space group: P1
- Unit cell: a = 10.02 Å, b = 9.54 Å, c = 9.89 Å; α = 104.5°, β = 66°, γ = 108.5°; Z = 1

Identification
- Color: Brown to orange
- Crystal habit: Equant to flattened euhedral crystals
- Mohs scale hardness: 3
- Luster: Vitreous
- Streak: Yellow
- Specific gravity: 5.8
- Optical properties: Biaxial
- Refractive index: n_{α} = 2.250 – 2.300 n_{γ} = 2.400 – 2.500
- Birefringence: δ = 0.150 – 0.200

Iranite (Persian: ایرانیت) is a triclinic lead copper chromate mineral with formula Pb_{10}Cu(CrO_{4})_{6}(SiO_{4})_{2}(F,OH)_{2}. It was first described from an occurrence in Iran. It is the copper analogue of hemihedrite (Pb_{10}Zn(CrO_{4})_{6}(SiO_{4})_{2}(F,OH)_{2}).

It occurs as an oxidation product of hydrothermal lead-bearing veins. Associated minerals include dioptase, fornacite, wulfenite, mimetite, cerussite and diaboleite. It was first described in 1970 for an occurrence in the Sebarz Mine, northeast of Anarak, Iran.
