= Georg Christian Füchsel =

German physician and geologist (1722–1773)

Georg Christian Füchsel (born 14 February 1722 in Ilmenau, Saxe-Weimar – died 20 June 1773 in Rudolstadt, Thuringia) was a German physician and geologist.

The works of Füchsel and Johann Gottlob Lehmann led to advances in stratigraphy.
