= Johann Gottlob Lehmann =

German and Russian mineralogist (1719–1767)

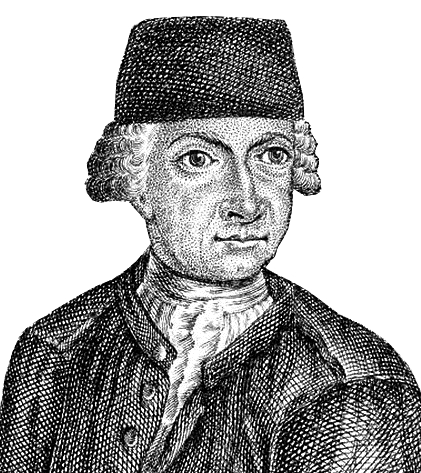
- Lehmann in the age of 42
- Born: 4 August 1719; Langenhennersdorf, Electorate of Saxony
- Died: 22 January 1767 (aged 47); Saint Petersburg, Russian Empire
- Education: University of Wittenberg
- Known for: Stratigraphy
- Scientific career
- Fields: Mineralogy

Johann Gottlob Lehmann (4 August 1719 – 22 January 1767) was a German mineralogist and geologist noted for his work and research contributions to the geologic record leading to the development of stratigraphy.

== Life and career ==
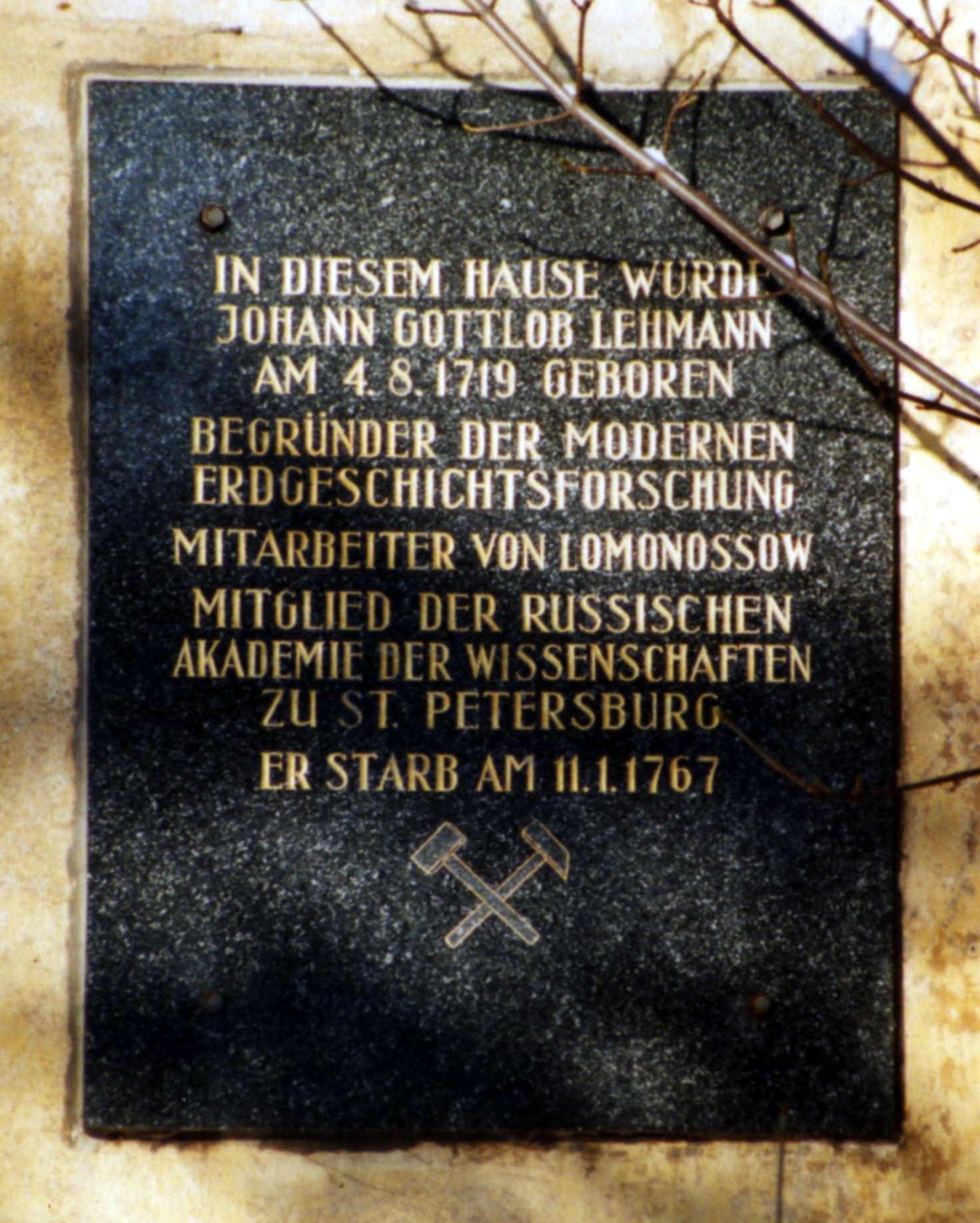
Memorial plaque of Johann Gottlob Lehmann on his birthplace in Langenhennersdorf in Saxony, Germany

Lehmann was born in Langenhennersdorf, Electorate of Saxony and attended the University of Wittenberg, from which he received an M.D. in 1741, and then established a practice in Dresden. Living in Saxony, he developed an interest in the local mining industry, and published on the chemical composition of ore deposits. In 1750, the Royal Prussian Academy of Sciences commissioned him to study mining practices throughout Prussia.

In 1761, the Russian Imperial Academy of Sciences invited him to Saint Petersburg, where he became professor of chemistry and director of the imperial museum there. At the Beryozovskoye deposit in the Urals he discovered a lead ore with a reddish-orange mineral (PbCrO_{4}), which he named "Rotbleierz" (red lead ore); today in English its name is crocoite.

Lehmann, Georg Christian Füchsel, and Giovanni Arduino were founders of stratigraphy.

The chief merit of Lehmann is his accurate description of the stratified rocks (Flötzgebirge). He distinguished thirty successive bands of rock in the stratified system of Ilfeld and Mansfeld, and set forth the geological structure of that district in an accompanying series of diagrams and sections. Many of the terms in his description of the Thuringian deposits were adopted by him from the miners, and have been retained in geological literature; for example, Zechstein or mine-stone, corresponding to the Magnesian Limestone and shales or Upper Dyassic group in England; and rothes Todtliegendes (Rothliegende) or red underlayer, the unproductive basement beds below the ore-bearing, and the equivalent of the Lower Dyassic.

Lehmann died in Saint Petersburg from injuries caused by the explosion of a retort filled with arsenic.

== Selected works ==
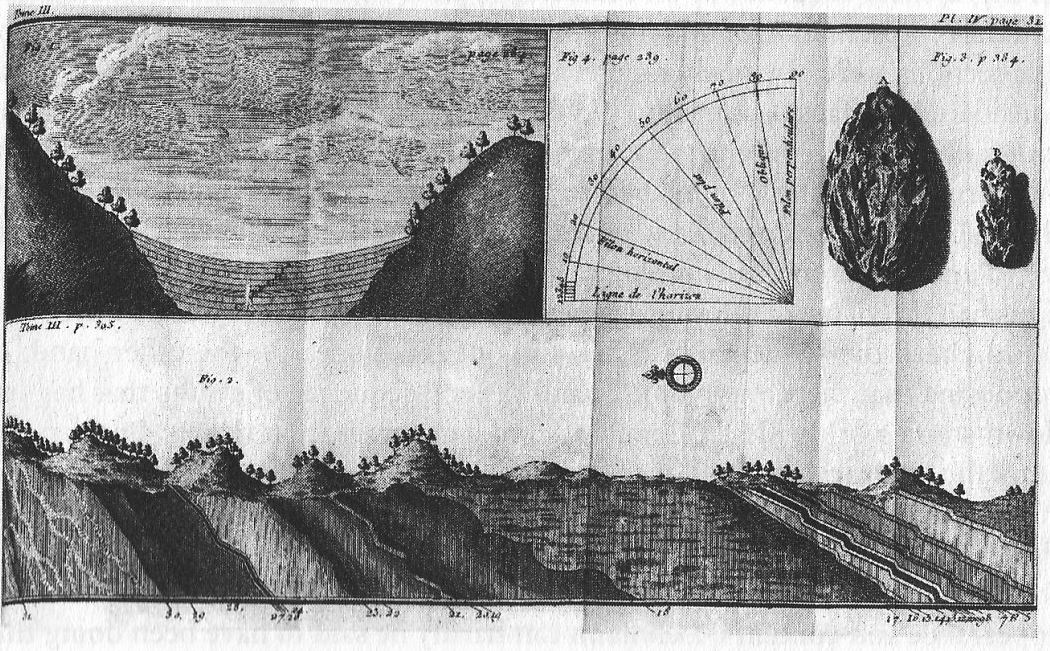
Geological profile created by Lehmann

- Abhandlung von den Metall-Müttern und der Erzeugung der Metalle aus der Naturlehre und Bergwerckswissenschaft hergeleitet und mit chymischen Versuchen erwiesen Berlin 1753
- Versuch einer Geschichte von Flötz-Gebürgen betreffend deren Entstehung, Lage, darinne befindliche Metallen, Mineralien und Foßilien größtentheils aus eigenen Wahrnehmungen und aus denen Grundsätzen der Natur-Lehre hergeleitet, und mit nöthigen Kupfern versehen Berlin 1756 (Digitalisat)
- Gedancken von denen Ursachen derer Erdbeben und deren Fortpflanzung unter der Erden Berlin 1757
- Kurzer Entwurf einer Mineralogie... Berlin 1758
- Cadmiologia oder Geschichte des Farben-Kobolds nach seinen Nahmen, Arten, Lagerstaedten darbey brechenden Metallen, Mineralien, Erzten und Steinen Berlin 1760
