= Reedmergnerite =

Silicate mineral

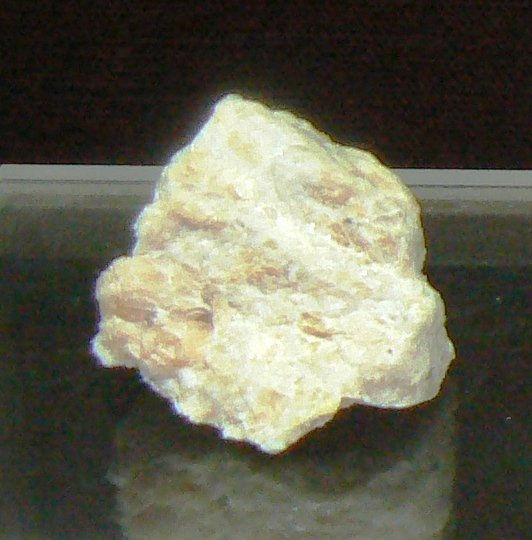

General
- Category: Minerals
- Formula: NaBSi_{3}O_{8}
- IMA symbol: Rm
- Strunz classification: 9.FA.35
- Dana classification: 76.1.4.1
- Crystal system: Triclinic
- Crystal class: Pinacoidal; H-M Symbol: 1̅
- Space group: C1̅
- Unit cell: 587.34

Identification
- Formula mass: 246.05
- Color: Colorless to yellow-orange, salmon-orange
- Cleavage: Perfect on {001}
- Mohs scale hardness: 6 – 6.5
- Luster: Vitreous
- Streak: White
- Diaphaneity: Transparent, translucent
- Density: 2.776
- Optical properties: Biaxial (−)
- Refractive index: n_{α} = 1.554 n_{β} = 1.565 n_{γ} = 1.573
- Birefringence: 0.019
- 2V angle: 80°
- Dispersion: None
- Common impurities: Ti, Al, Fe, Mg, Ca, Ba, K, F, H_{2}O, P

Reedmergnerite is a borosilicate mineral named in honor of Frank S. Reed and John L. Mergner. It is approved by the International Mineralogical Association but was first described prior to the association's formation, first published in 1955. Although it is approved, it got grandfathered, meaning the name reedmergnerite is still believed to refer to a valid species. Reedmergnerite has a synthetic potassium analogue.

== Properties ==
Reedmergnerite is a member of the feldspar group. It grows along bedding laminations as authigenic crystals, as a stubby prismatic to platy crystals. It is wedge-shaped usually, and it may have jagged terminations. Crystals grow in aggregates, and a singular crystal's size can reach up to 10 cm. It is isostructural with low albite. It does not exhibit anisotropy. The mineral has been synthesized using gels. The procedure occurred hydrothermally. The gels that were used in the synthesis contained a 10% weight excess of silicon dioxide. While the pressure and the temperature were constant, the degree of boron and silicon order increased with time, though both lower water content and pressure decrease the rate of ordering. The mineral's ordering behavior occurs to be insensitive to the co-existing fluid's composition.

== Environment and mining ==
Although it has three type localities, the most important of those is at Joseph Smith No. 1 well in the United States. The associated minerals at the type locality are eitelite, searlesite, crocidolite, leucosphenite and shortite. It happens to occur in dolomitic shale mostly. However, it can also occur in brown dolomitic rock and black oil shale as well.
