= Rynersonite =

Oxide mineral

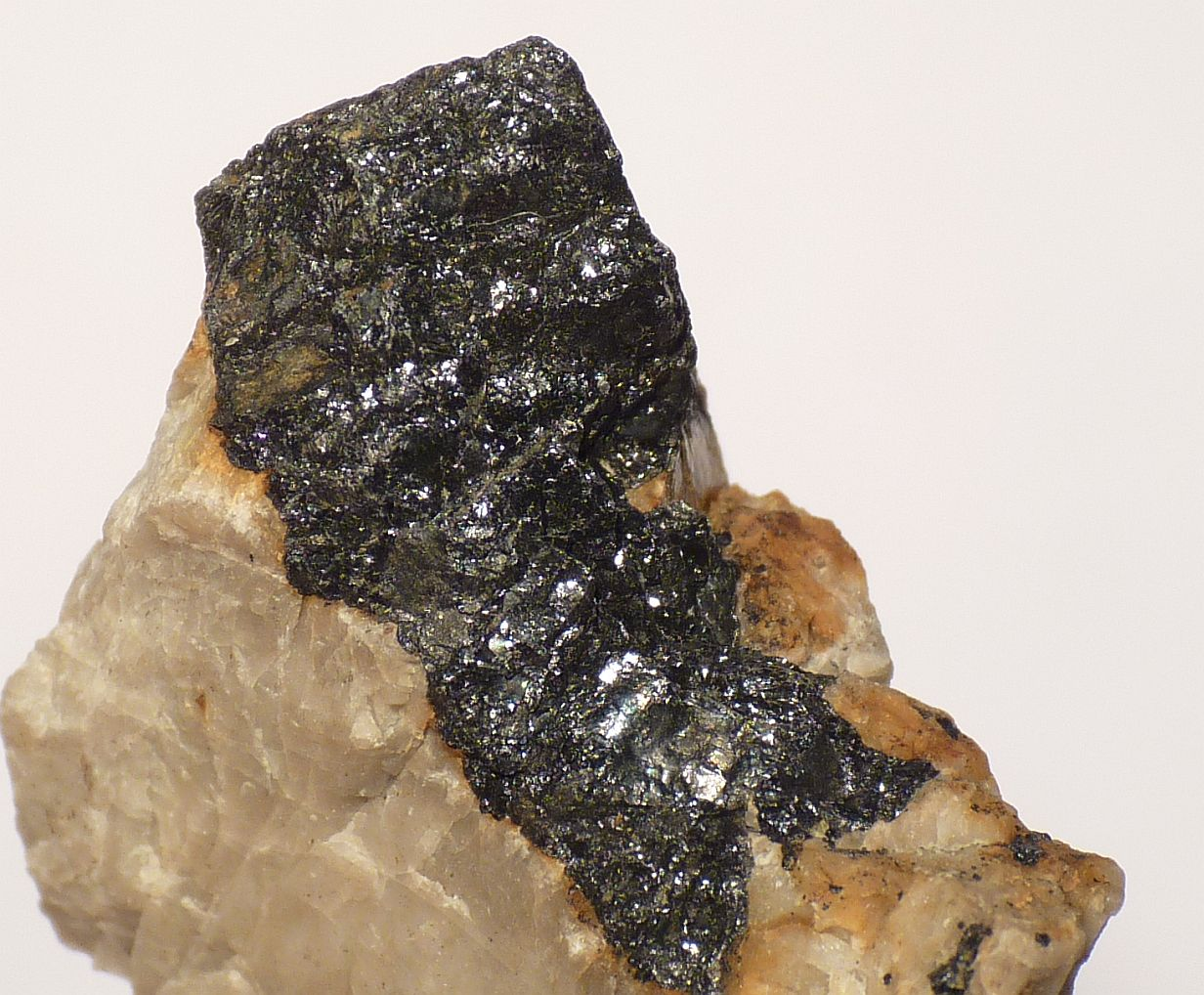
- A close up picture of the crystalized mineral.

General
- Category: Minerals
- Formula: (Ca(Ta,Nb)_{2}O_{6})

Identification
- Color: Off-white, pale pink
- Luster: Dull

Rynersonite (Ca(Ta,Nb)_{2}O_{6}) is an oxide mineral. It crystallizes in the orthorhombic crystal system. It is dull, translucent mineral, fibrous in nature. Usually off-white to pale pink in color. It occurs in granitic pegmatites and was first described for an occurrence in San Diego County, California in 1978.

Besides the San Diego, California area, Rynersonite is also found in Colorado and Kampala, Uganda.
