= Vauquelinite =

Complex mineral

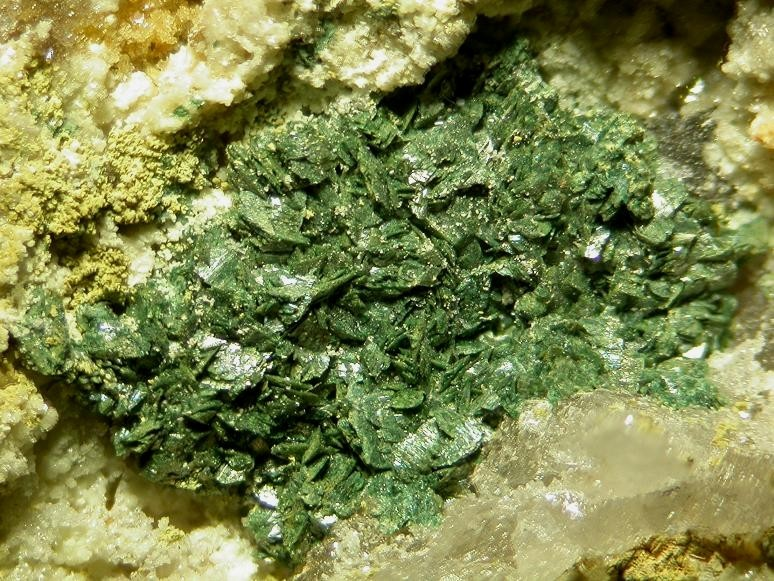

General
- Category: Phosphate mineral
- Formula: CuPb_{2}(CrO_{4})(PO_{4})(OH)
- IMA symbol: Vql
- Strunz classification: 7.FC.05
- Crystal system: Monoclinic
- Crystal class: Prismatic (2/m) (same H-M symbol)
- Space group: P2_{1}/n
- Unit cell: a = 13.754(5) Å, b = 5.806(6) Å c = 9.563(3) Å; β = 94.55°; Z = 4

Identification
- Color: Olive-green, apple-green, brown to nearly black
- Crystal habit: Irregular wedge shaped crystals, mammillary, reniform masses
- Twinning: Present on {102}
- Cleavage: Indistinct
- Fracture: Irregular
- Tenacity: Brittle
- Mohs scale hardness: 2.5 – 3
- Luster: Adamantine, resinous
- Streak: Greenish or brownish
- Diaphaneity: Translucent
- Specific gravity: 6.16
- Optical properties: Biaxial (−)
- Refractive index: n_{α} = 2.110 n_{β} = 2.220 n_{γ} = 2.220
- Birefringence: δ = 0.110
- Pleochroism: X = Light green, Y = Light brown, Z = Light brown
- 2V angle: Near zero

Vauquelinite is a complex mineral with the formula CuPb_{2}(CrO_{4})(PO_{4})(OH) making it a combined chromate and phosphate of copper and lead. It forms a series with the arsenate mineral fornacite.

It was first described in 1818 in the Beryozovskoye deposit, Urals, Russia, and named for Louis Vauquelin (1763–1829), a French chemist. It occurs in oxidized hydrothermal ore deposits and is associated with crocoite, pyromorphite, mimetite, cerussite, beudantite and duftite at the type locality in Russia.
