= Phoenicochroite =

Lead chromate mineral

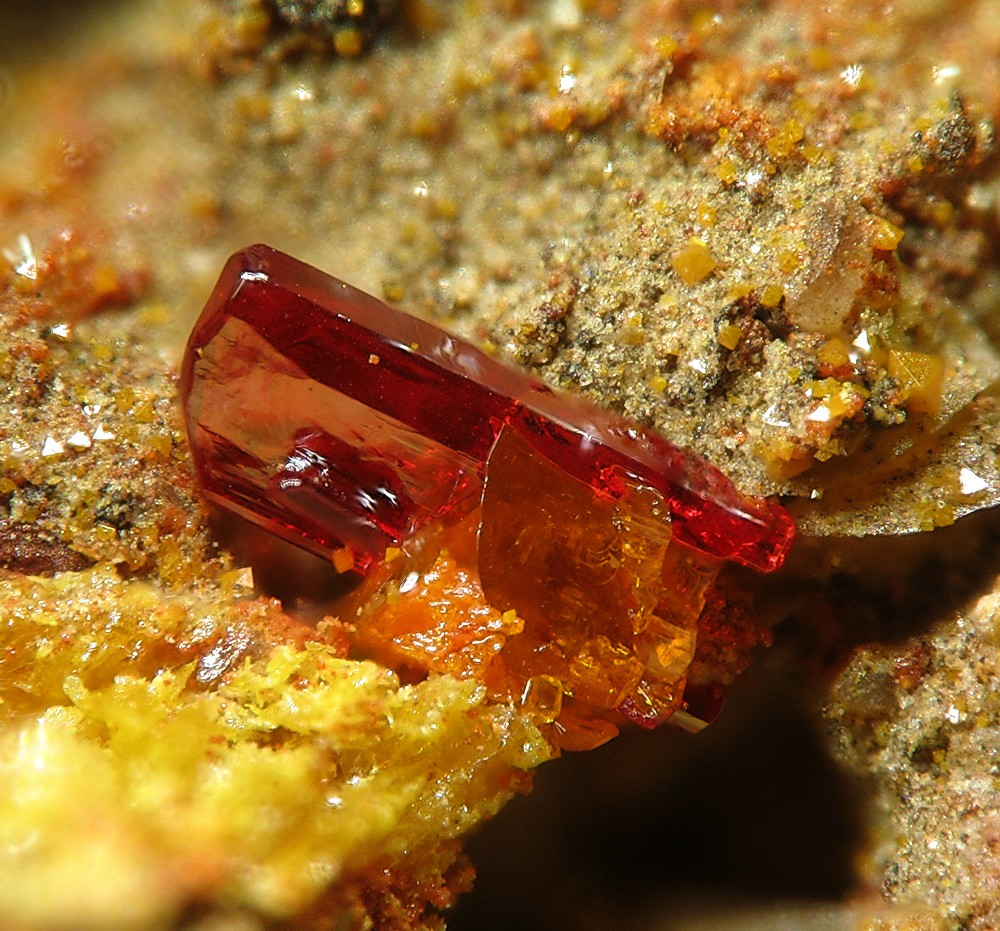
- Deep red Phoenicochroite crystal, with orange-yellow schwartzembergite. San Francisco Mine, Tocopilla Province, Chile. Photo width 1.5 mm.

General
- Category: Sulfate (chromate) mineral
- Formula: Pb_{2}O(CrO_{4})
- IMA symbol: Phc
- Strunz classification: 7.FB.05
- Dana classification: 35.1.2.1 Anhydrous chromates
- Crystal system: Monoclinic
- Crystal class: Prismatic (2/m) (same H-M symbol)
- Space group: C2/m
- Unit cell: a = 14 Å, b = 5.67 Å, c = 7.13 Å; β = 115.22°; Z = 4

Identification
- Color: Dark red, bright red
- Crystal habit: Tabular crystals; thin coatings, and massive
- Cleavage: Perfect on {201}
- Tenacity: Sectile
- Mohs scale hardness: 2 1/2
- Luster: Adamantine, resinous
- Streak: Brick-red
- Diaphaneity: Translucent
- Specific gravity: 5.75, 7.01
- Optical properties: Biaxial (+)
- Refractive index: n_{α} = 2.380, n_{β} = 2.440, n_{γ} = 2.650
- Birefringence: 0.270 (δ)
- 2V angle: 58° (measured)
- Other characteristics: Health risks: contains carcinogenic and mutagenic chromate ion

Phoenicochroite, also known as melanochroite, is a lead chromate mineral with formula Pb_{2}OCrO_{4}. It forms striking orange red crystals. It was first discovered in 1839 in Beryozovskoye deposit, Urals, Russia. It is named from the Greek word φοίυικος for "deep red" and χρόα for "color", in allusion to its color.
