= Wulfenite =

Molybdate mineral

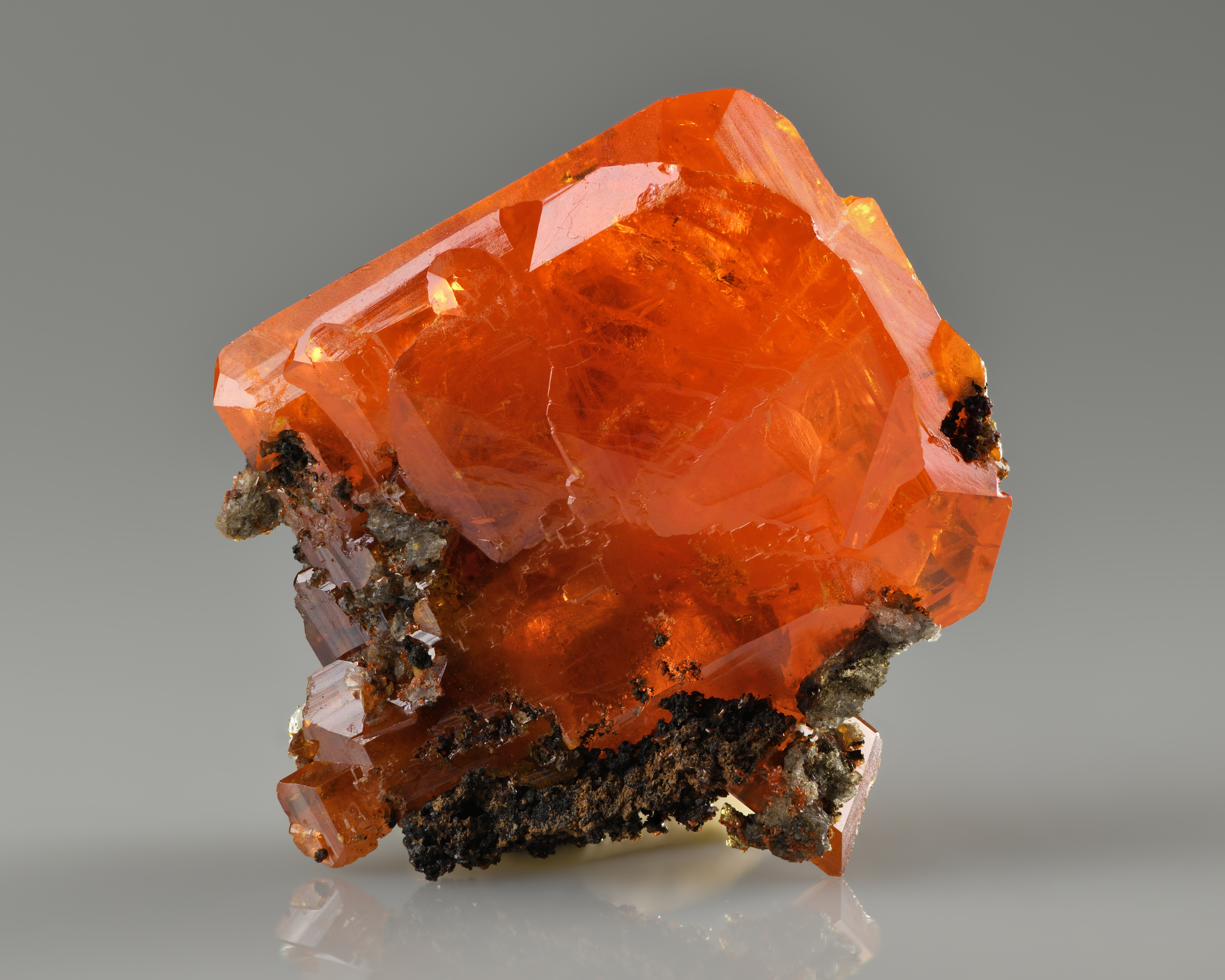
- Wulfenite from Red Cloud mine, Arizona

General
- Category: Molybdate mineral
- Formula: PbMoO_{4}
- IMA symbol: Wul
- Strunz classification: 7.GA.05
- Crystal system: Tetragonal
- Crystal class: Dipyramidal (4/m); H-M symbol: (4/m)
- Space group: I4_{1}/a
- Unit cell: a = 5.433, c = 12.110 [Å]; Z = 4

Identification
- Color: Orange-yellow, yellow, honey-yellow, reddish-orange, rarely colorless, grey, brown, olive-green and even black
- Crystal habit: Thin tabular to pyramidal
- Twinning: Twins on the [001] common
- Cleavage: On {011}, distinct; on {001}, {013}, indistinct
- Fracture: Irregular to sub-conchoidal
- Tenacity: Brittle
- Mohs scale hardness: 3
- Luster: Adamantine, resinous
- Streak: White
- Diaphaneity: Transparent to opaque
- Specific gravity: 6.5–7.0
- Optical properties: Uniaxial (−), may be anomalously biaxial
- Refractive index: n_{ω} = 2.405 n_{ε} = 2.283
- Birefringence: δ = 0.122
- Pleochroism: Weak; orange and yellow
- Ultraviolet fluorescence: None
- Other characteristics: Specimens may be piezoelectric

Wulfenite is a lead molybdate mineral with the formula PbMoO_{4}. It often occurs as thin tabular crystals with a bright orange-red to yellow-orange color, sometimes brown, although the color can be highly variable. In its yellow form it is sometimes called "yellow lead ore".

It crystallizes in the tetragonal system, often occurring as stubby, pyramidal or tabular crystals. It also occurs as earthy, granular masses. It is found in many localities, associated with lead ores as a secondary mineral associated with the oxidized zone of lead deposits. It is also a secondary ore of molybdenum, and is sought by collectors.

== Discovery and occurrence ==
Wulfenite was first described in 1845 for an occurrence in Bad Bleiberg, Carinthia, Austria. It was named for Franz Xaver von Wulfen (1728–1805), an Austrian mineralogist.

It occurs as a secondary mineral in oxidized hydrothermal lead deposits. It occurs with cerussite, anglesite, smithsonite, hemimorphite, vanadinite, pyromorphite, mimetite, descloizite, plattnerite and various iron and manganese oxides.

A noted locality for wulfenite is the Red Cloud Mine in Arizona. Crystals are deep red in color and usually very well-formed. Wulfenite was approved as the official state mineral of Arizona in 2017. The Los Lamentos locality in Mexico produced very thick tabular orange crystals.

Another locality is Mount Peca in Slovenia. The crystals are yellow, often with well-developed pyramids and bipyramids. In 1997, the crystal was depicted on a stamp by the Post of Slovenia.

Lesser known localities of wulfenite include: Sherman Tunnel, St. Peter's Dome, Tincup-Tomichi-Moncarch mining districts, Pride of America mine and Bandora mine in Colorado.

Small crystals also occur in Bulwell and Kirkby-in-Ashfield, England. These crystals occur in a galena-wulfenite-uraniferous asphaltite horizon in a magnesian limestone. The wulfenite found in this area is similar in properties (paragenetic sequence, low silver and antimony contents of the galenas and absence of pyromorphite) to the wulfenites of the Alps and may be similar in origin.

== Crystallography ==
Wulfenite crystallizes in the tetragonal system and possesses nearly equal axial ratios; as a result, it is considered to be crystallographically similar to scheelite (CaWO_{4}). Wulfenite is classed by a pyramidal-hemihedral (tetragonal dipyramidal) (C_{4}h) crystal symmetry. Therefore, the unit cell is formed by placing points at the vertices and centers of the faces of rhomboids with square bases and the crystallographic axes coincide in directions with the edges of the rhomboids. Two of these lattices interpenetrate such that a point on the first is diagonal to the second and one quarter the distance between the two seconds.

An extensive solid solution exists between the two end members wulfenite and stolzite (PbWO_{4}), such that tungstenian-wulfenite compositions range from 90% wulfenite and 10% stolzite to chillagite (64% wulfenite, 36% stolzite) and so on. Nevertheless, the Commission for New Minerals and Mineral Names of the International Mineralogical Association has deemed that the solid solutions do not require new names. The correct nomenclature of the 90:10 solid state is wulfenite-I4_{1}/a and the 64:36 solid state is wulfenite-I4. The structure of the wulfenite-I4_{1}/a system can be described as a close packing of tetrahedral MoO_{4}^{2−} anions and Pb^{2+} cations. In the lattice, the MoO_{4}^{2−} anions are slightly distorted, though the bond lengths remain equal and the oxygens are linked through Pb-O bonds. Each lead atom has an 8-coordination with oxygen and two slightly different Pb-O bond distances. This structure closely resembles that of pure wulfenite.

The structure of wulfenite-I4 is also very similar to that of wulfenite-I4_{1}/a but has an unequal distribution of tungsten and molybdenum which may explain the observed hemihedrism.

It is argued that no miscibility gap exists in the wulfenite-stolzite solid solution at room temperature due to the almost identical size and shape of the MoO_{4}^{2−} and WO_{4}^{2−} ions; however, arguments have been made for the existence of a miscibility gap at higher temperatures.

== Hemihedrism ==
The crystals of wulfenite are usually more tabular and thinner than those of scheelite; however, the more pyramidal and prismatic crystals show distinct hemimorphism.

== Thermodynamics and reactivity ==
The heat capacity, entropy and enthalpy of wulfenite were determined taking into consideration the existence of solid solutions and the inclusion of impurities. The reported values are as follows: Cp°(298.15) = 119.41±0.13 J/molK, S°(298.15) = (168.33±2.06)J/molK, ΔH°= (23095±50) J/mol.

When forced through a tube into a flame, wulfenite disintegrates audibly and fuses readily. With the salt of phosphorus, it yields molybdenum beads. With soda on charcoal it yields a lead globule. When the powdered mineral is evaporated with HCl, molybdic oxide is formed.

Molybdenum can be extracted from wulfenite by crushing the ore to 60–80 mesh, mixing the ore with NaNO_{3} or NaOH, heating the mixture to about 700 °C (decomposing), leaching with water, filtering, collecting the insoluble residues which may include Fe, Al, Zn, Cu, Mn, Pb, Au and Ag, then the NaMoO_{4} solution is agitated with a solution of MgCl_{2}, filtered, CaCl_{2} or FeCl_{2} or any other chlorides is added to the Mo solution and heated and agitated, filtered and the desired product is collected. The full process is patented by the Union Carbide and Carbon Corp.

== Synthesis ==
Wulfenite has been shown to form synthetically through the sintering of molybdite with cerussite as well as that of molybdite with lead oxide. The following will describe both methods of synthesis.

Synthesis from molybdite and cerussite:

Thermal analysis of the 1:1 mix of molybdite and cerussite first displayed the characteristic peaks of cerussite. There is a sharp endothermic peak at 300 °C, which occurs during the dehydration of hydrocerussite associated with cerussite. A second peak at 350 °C is the first step of cerussite’s dissociation into PbO*PbCO_{3}. Later at 400 °C, a medium endothermic peak represents the second step of the dissociation into lead oxide. These transitions involve a decrease in mass, which occurs in steps. First, the dehydration of hydrocerussite is marked by its loss of constitutional OH and later is the freeing of carbon dioxide during the cerussite dissociation. The formation of wulfenite occurs at 520 °C, as observed in the exothermic peak. The reaction between lead oxides and molybdenum takes place at 500–600 °C, along with the formation of lead molybdate.

The endothermic peaks at 880 and 995 °C perhaps denote the vaporization and melting of unreacted lead and molybdenum oxides. A small peak at 1050 °C represents the melting of the wulfenite product itself, while an even smaller peak at 680 °C may indicate some vaporization of molybdite as the molybdenum oxide volatilizes at 600–650 °C.

This reaction occurs as follows:

350 °C: 2PbCO_{3} → PbO*PbCO_{3}+CO_{2}

400 °C: PbO*PbCO_{3} → 2PbO+CO_{2}

500–520 °C: MoO _{3}+PbO → PbMoO_{4} (wulfenite)

Synthesis from molybdite and lead oxide:

Thermal analysis for molybdite and lead oxide mixes at a 1:1 ratio suggest that the formation of wulfenite occurs at 500 °C, as can be seen by an exothermic peak at this temperature. Microscopic investigation of the products show that at 500 °C, wulfenite is the main product, while at 950 °C, wulfenite is the only constituent of the product, as grains of molybdite and lead oxide melt and undergo volatilization. A small endothermic peak at 640 °C may represent the start of vaporization, and a sharp and large endothermic peak at 980 °C indicates the melting and volatilization of the unreacted lead and molybdenum oxides.

Characteristics of synthetic wulfenite:

Synthetically-made wulfenite will have the following composition: 61.38% PbO and 38.6% MoO_{3}. This synthesis will give you samples of wulfenite that is pale-yellow in thin sections and is optically negative. It crystallizes in the tetragonal system, in the form of square tabular crystals, and with distinct cleavage on {011}. It crystals also display transparency and adamantine luster. The X-ray diffraction data, calculated cell dimensions, constants and optic axial angles of the synthetic wulfenite are consistent with those of the natural mineral.

== Coloration ==
Pure wulfenite is colorless, but most samples display colors ranging from a creamy yellow to a sharp, intense red. Some samples even display blues, browns, and blacks. The yellow and red coloration of wulfenites is caused by small traces of chromium. Others have suggested that while the lead adds little colors, perhaps the molybdate contributes to wulfenite’s yellow color.

More recent studies suggest that though the source of strong coloration is the presence of extrinsic impurities, the nonstoichiometry in both cationic and anionic sublattices also plays a major role in the coloration of the crystals. Tyagi et al. (2010) found that a reason for coloration in wulfenite is extrinsic impurity, as they were able to grow crystals displaying red, green, and various shades of yellow simply through changing the purity of the starting charges. They also posited that the presence of Pb^{3+} is not the cause of coloration. Because the crystals they grew in an Ar ambient are light yellow in color, they suggest that the interstitial oxygen concentration may be another cause in the coloration of wulfenite. Tyagi et al. note, however, the Mo is in a lower valence state when in Ar ambient, meaning it is Mo^{5+} rather than Mo^{6+}. This suggests that the concentration of Mo^{5+} sites is also a cause of the coloration.

Talla et al. (2013) posits that trace amounts of chromium do in fact play a role in determining the coloration of wulfenite. Here, the CrO_{4}^{2-} anion group substitutes for the MoO_{4}^{2-} group in the tetrahedral position. They found that as little as 0.002 atoms per formula unit (apfu) of Cr^{6+} substituting for Mo^{6+} is adequate to result in an orange-hued specimen. Cr^{6+} apfu values of 0.01 were able to result in a red color. Talla et al. went on to emphasize that the colors result from a change of absorption intensity rather than a change of spectral position.

== Gallery ==
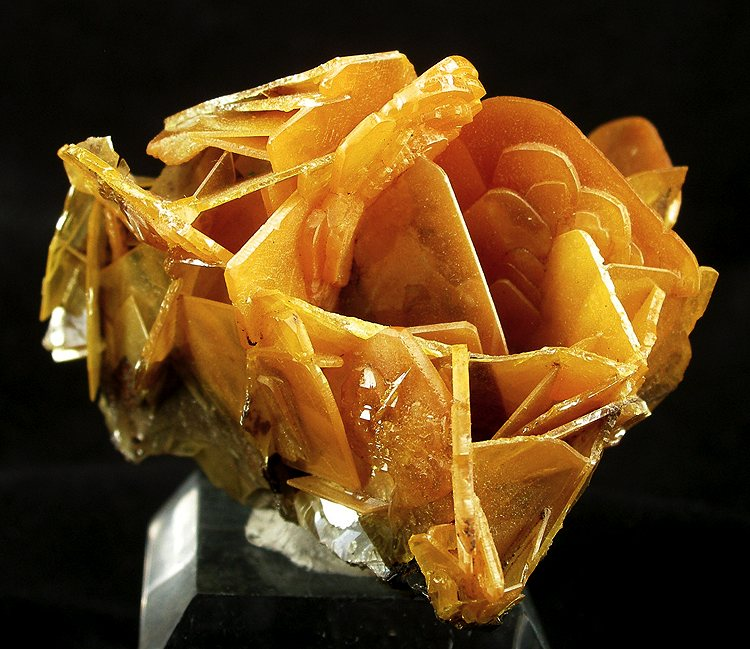
Cluster of translucent, butterscotch-colored wulfenite blades from the Glove Mine, Arizona, US

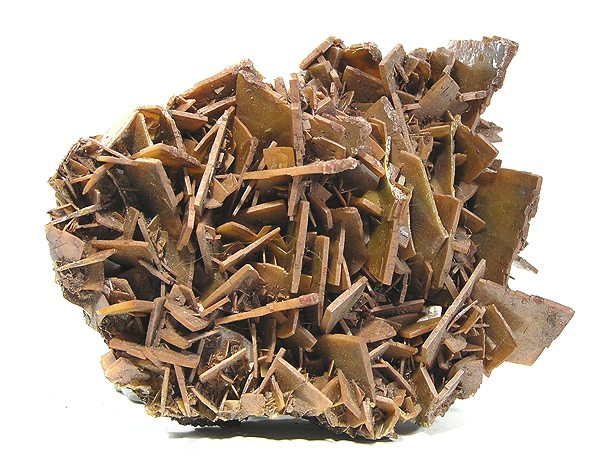
A plate of very sharp, chocolate-brown crystals of wulfenite to 1.5 cm on edge

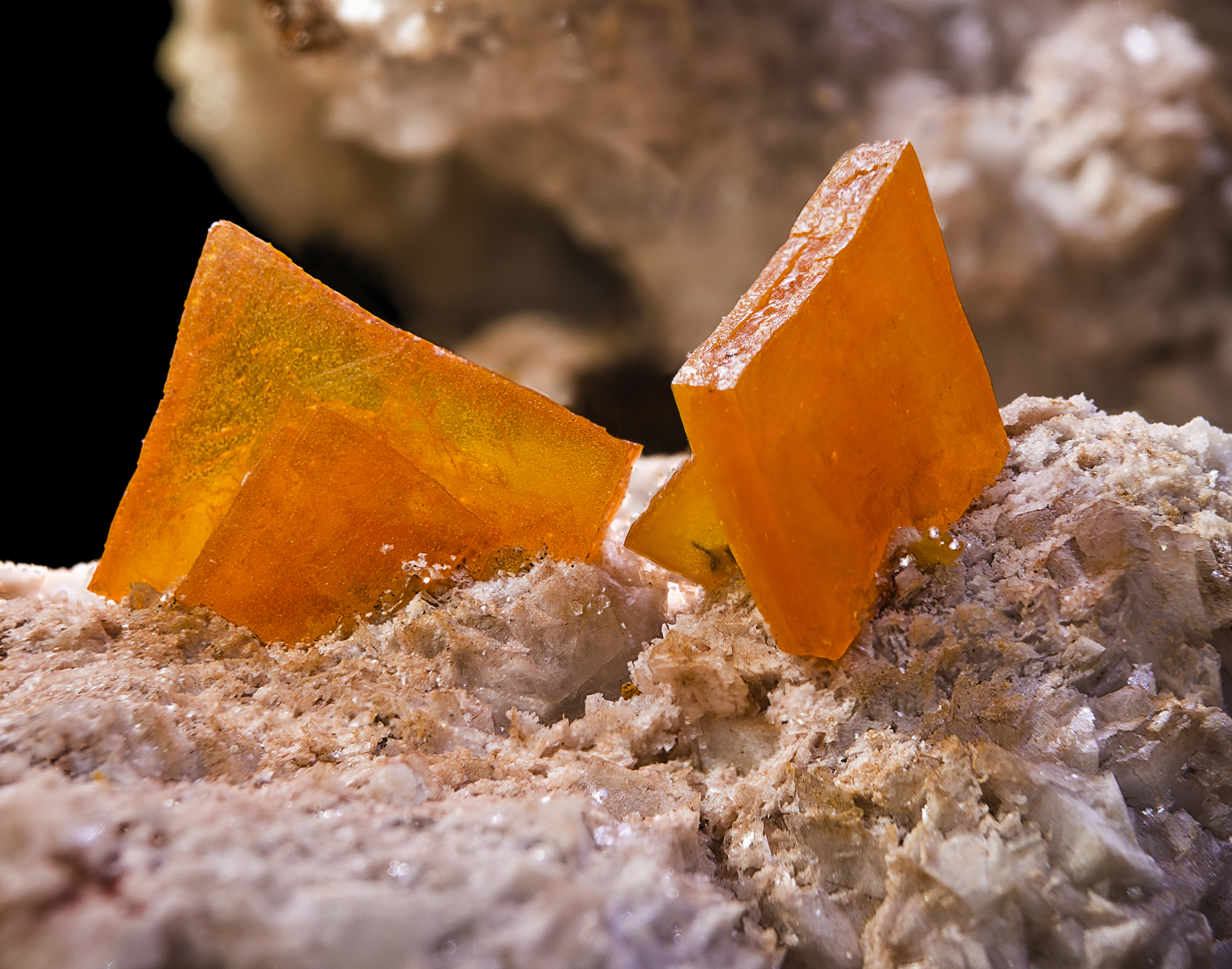
Wulfenite from Los Lamentos, Chihuahua, Mexico

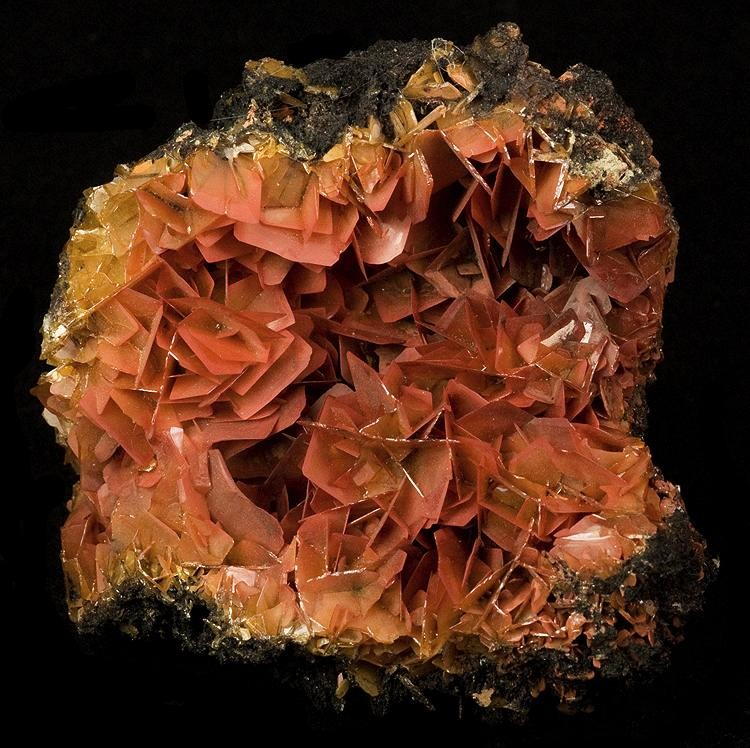
A rich jumble of tabular, reddish-brown wulfenite crystals fills the vug in the geode-like gossan matrix on this specimen

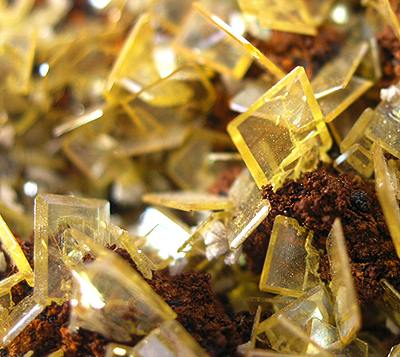
Wulfenite specimen from the Mina Ojuela, Mapimi, Durango, Mexico

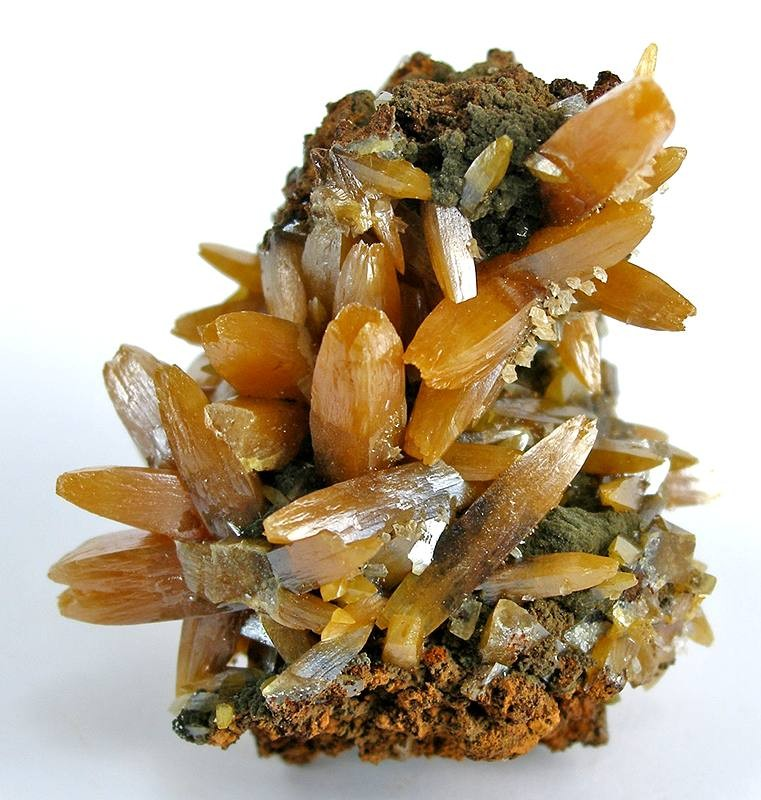
Specimen from the Mina Ojuela, Mapimí, Durango, Mexico

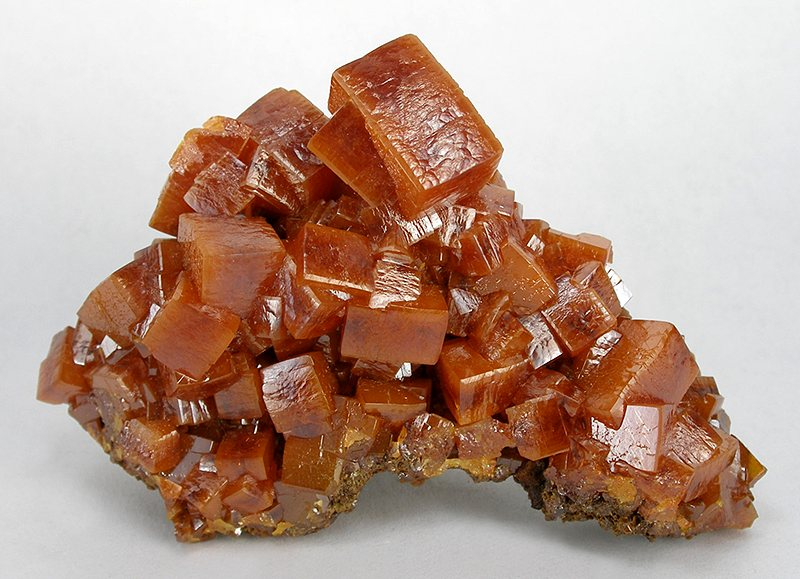
Intensely colored crystals to 1.7 cm, from Los Lamentos, Municipio de Ahumada, Chihuahua, Mexico

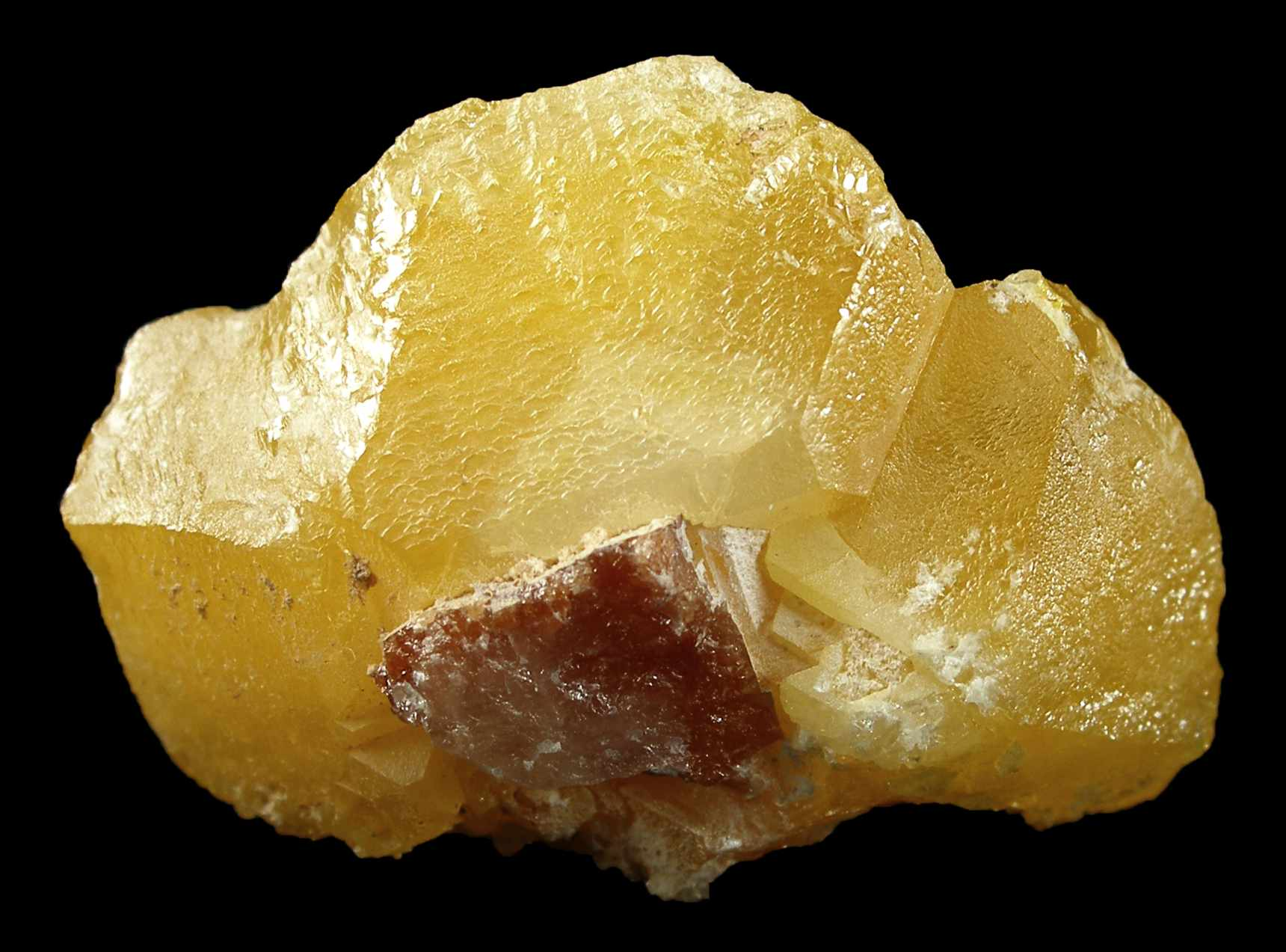
A yellow crystal elongated on its sides, with a small attached cerussite in front. Kunene Region, Namibia

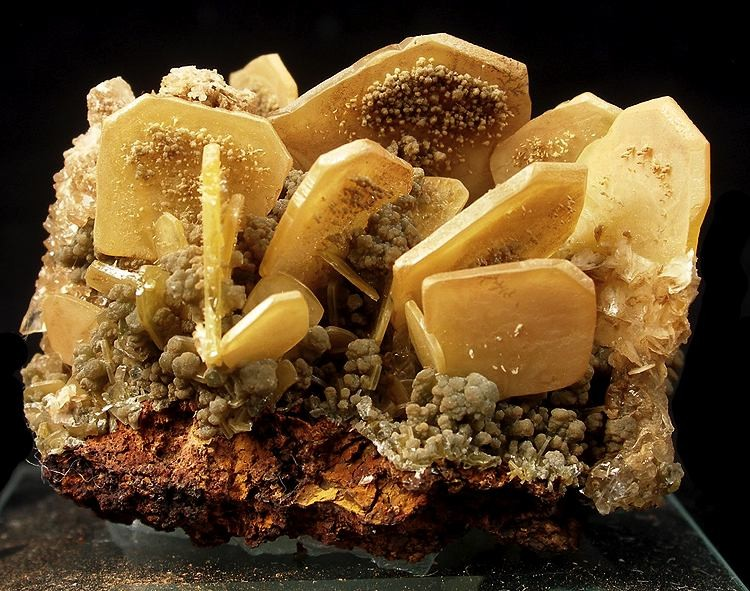
A classic cluster of butterscotch-colored wulfenite blades richly dusted with olive-green mimetite botryoids. Ojuela Mine, Mapimí, Durango, Mexico.

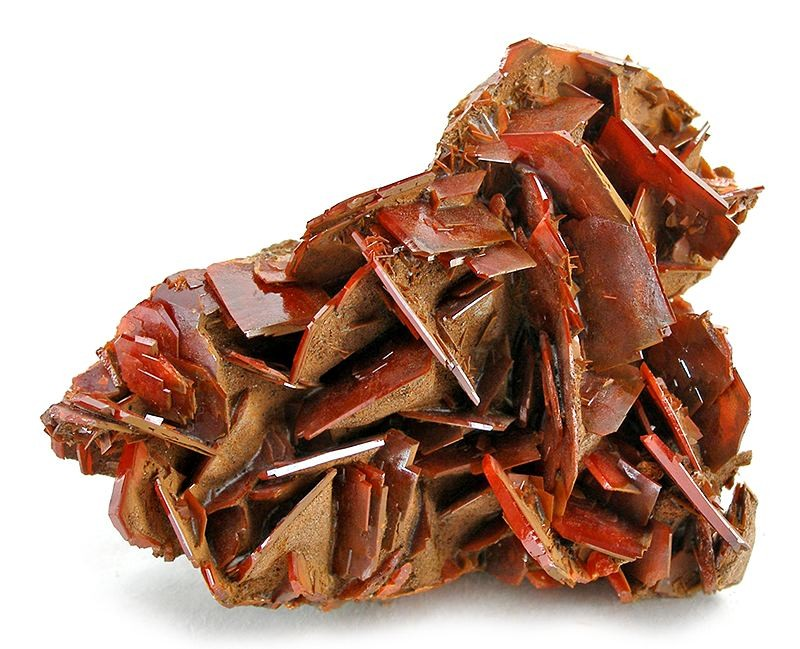
Wulfenite from Jianshan Mine, Xinjiang, China

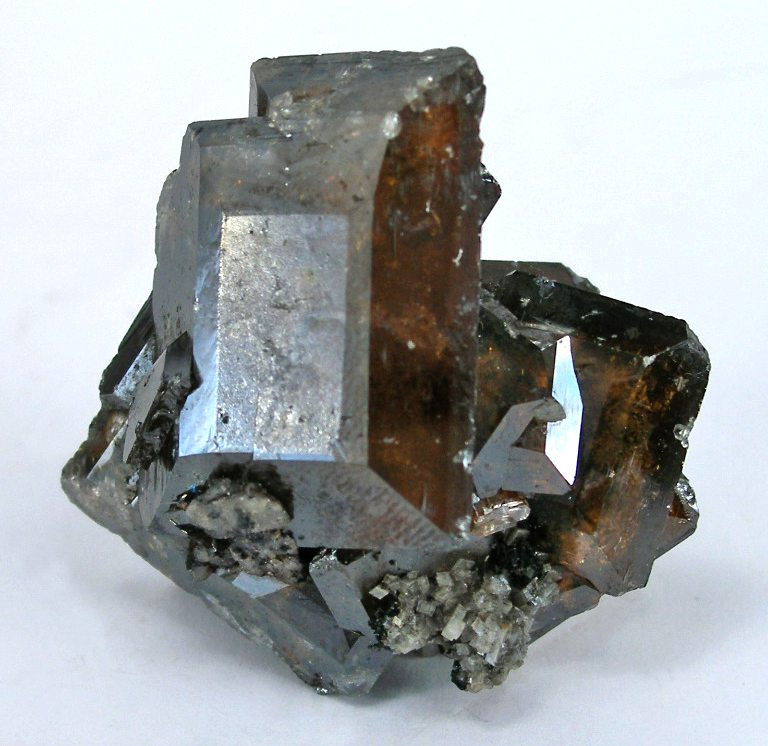
Wulfenite from Tsumeb Mine, Namibia

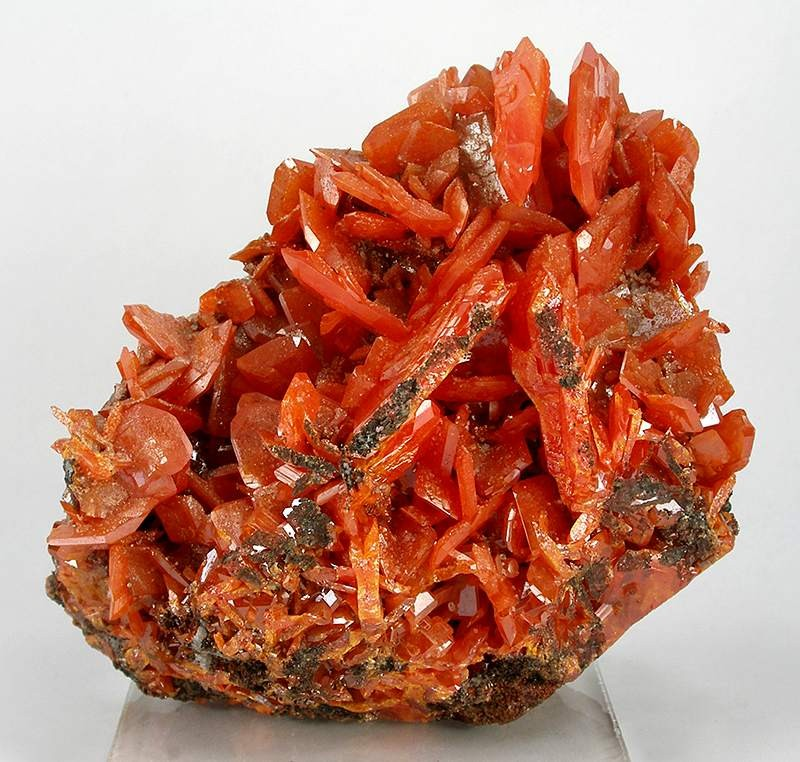
Red crystals of wulfenite, from the Red Cloud Mine, Trigo Mountains, La Paz County, Arizona

== See also ==
- List of minerals named after people
