= List of minerals recognized by the International Mineralogical Association (M) =

This list includes those recognised minerals beginning with the letter M. The International Mineralogical Association is the international group that recognises new minerals and new mineral names; however, minerals discovered before 1959 did not go through the official naming procedure, although some minerals published previously have been either confirmed or discredited since that date. This list contains a mixture of mineral names that have been approved since 1959 and those mineral names believed to still refer to valid mineral species (these are called "grandfathered" species).

The list is divided into groups:

- Introduction • (Main synonyms)
- A • B • C • D • E • F • G • H • I • J • K • L • M • N • O • P–Q • R • S • T • U–V • W–X • Y–Z

The data was exported from mindat.org on 29 April 2005; updated up to 'IMA2021'.

The minerals are sorted by name, followed by the structural group (rruff.info/ima and ima-cnmnc by mineralienatlas.de, mainly) or chemical class (mindat.org and basics), the year of publication (if it's before of an IMA approval procedure), the IMA approval and the Strunz-mindat code. The first link is to mindat.org, the second link is to webmineral.com, and the third is to the Handbook of Mineralogy (Mineralogical Society of America).

- Abbreviations:
  - ^{D} – discredited (IMA/CNMNC status).
  - ^{Q} – questionable/ doubtful (IMA/CNMNC, mindat.org or mineralienatlas.de status).
  - ^{N} – published without approval of the IMA/CNMNC, or just not an IMA approved mineral but with some acceptance in the scientific community nowadays.
  - ^{I} – intermediate member of a solid-solution series.
  - ^{H} – hypothetical mineral (synthetic, anthropogenic, suspended approval procedure, etc.)
    - ^{ch} – incomplete description, hypothetical solid solution end member.
  - Rd – redefinition of ...
  - "s.p." – special procedure.
  - group – a name used to designate a group of species, sometimes only a mineral group name.
  - no – no link available.
  - IUPAC – chemical name.
  - Y: NNNN – year of publication.
  - Y: old – known before publications were available.

== M ==
=== Ma ===
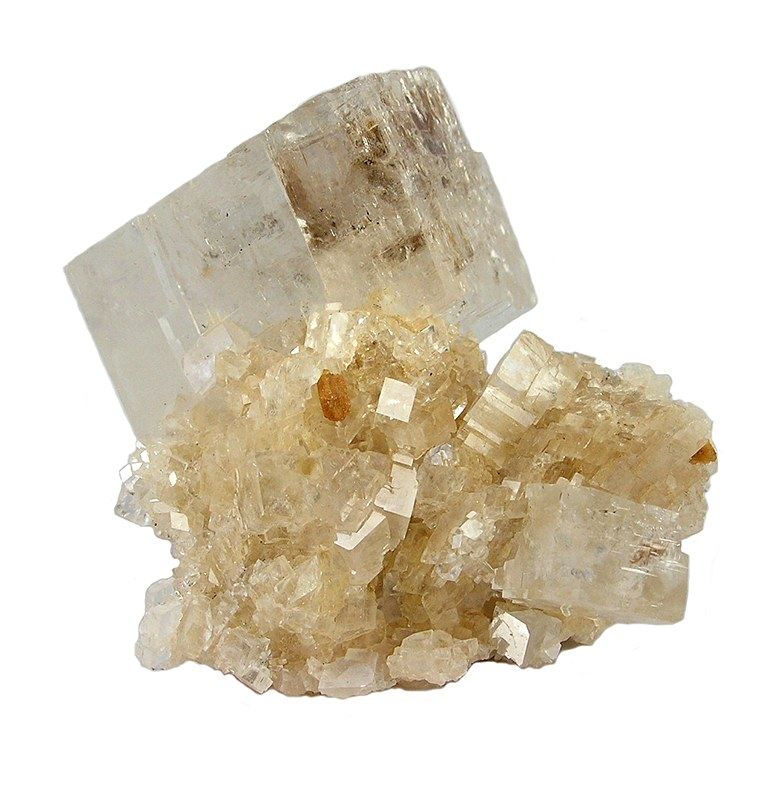
Florencite on magnesite

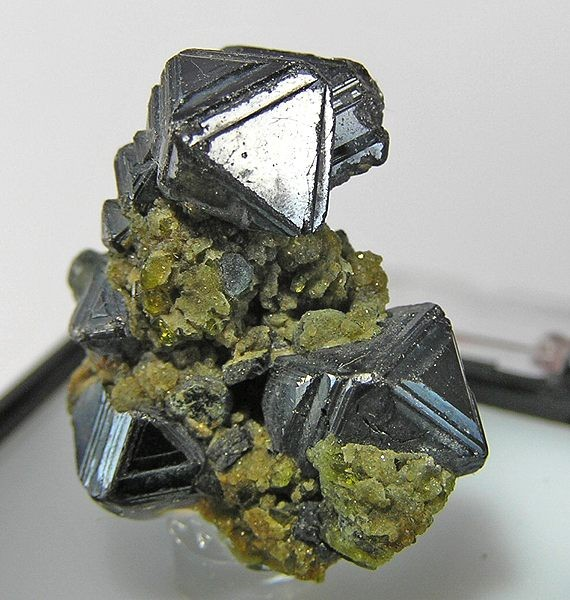
Magnetite with sharp crystals with epitaxial elevations on their faces

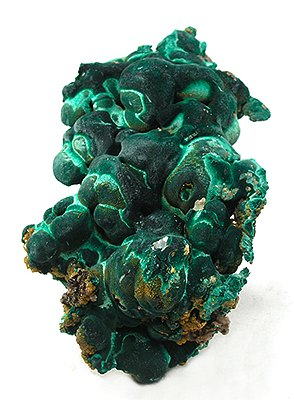
Malachite, Rum Jungle, Northern Territory, Australia. Size 10.5 × 6.5 × 3.2 cm

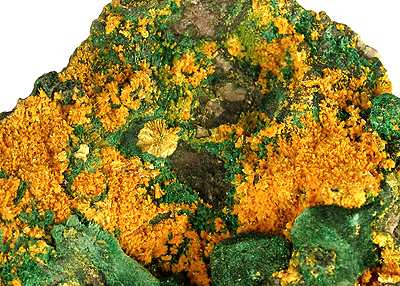
Malachite and tyuyamunite, Kolwezi, Katanga, overall size 8.9 × 8.7 × 8.1 cm

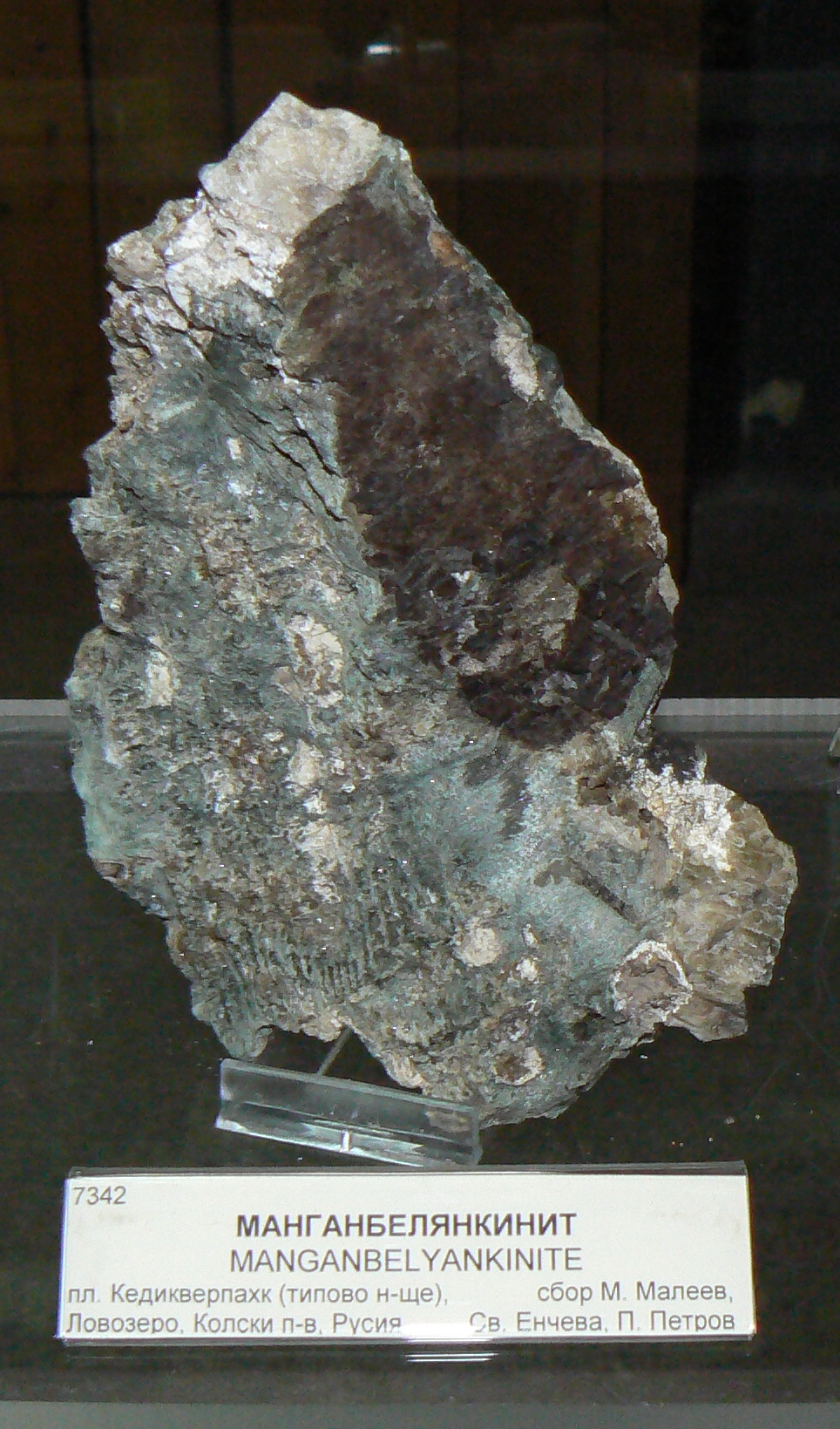
Manganbelyankinite, Lovozero Massif, Kola Peninsula, Russia

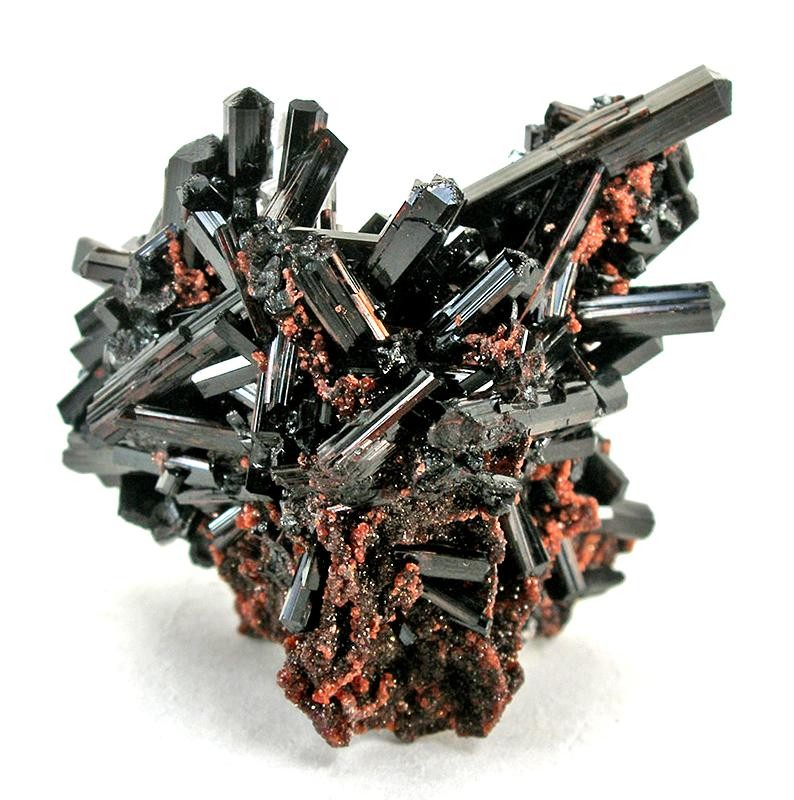
Manganvesuvianite, Wessels mine, Northern Cape Province, South Africa. Size 4.2 × 3.9 × 3.3 cm

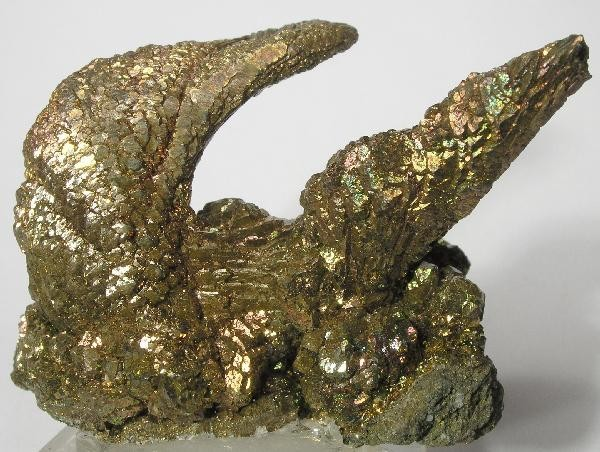
Marcasite, Dachang tin-polymetallic ore field, Nandan County, Guangxi, China. Size: 3.5 × 3 × 1.5 cm

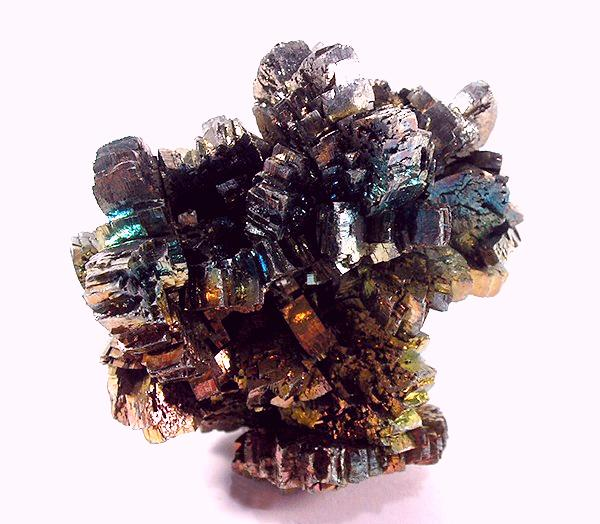
Iridescent marcasite, Tri-State District, Baxter Springs, Kansas. Size 6.9 × 5.9 × 3.2 cm

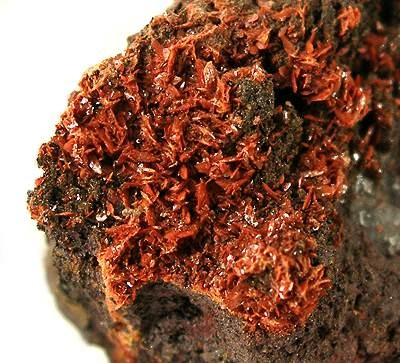
Mawbyite, Tsumeb mine, Namibia. Size: 1.9 × 1.5 × 0.9 cm

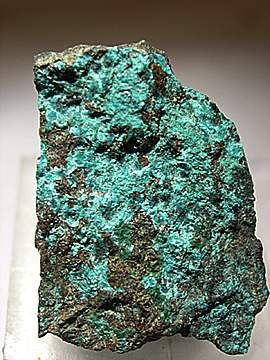
Mcguinnessite, a rare copper carbonate, from the Red Mountain District, Santa Clara County, California. Size 3.7 × 3 × 1.3 cm

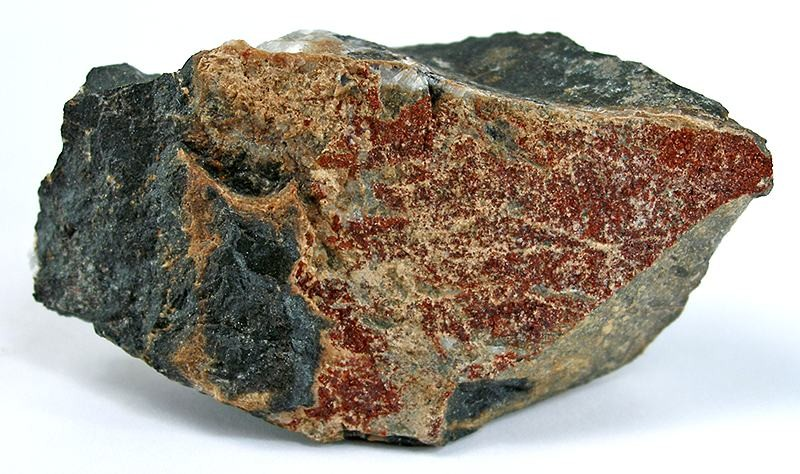
Thin crust on matrix of medaite

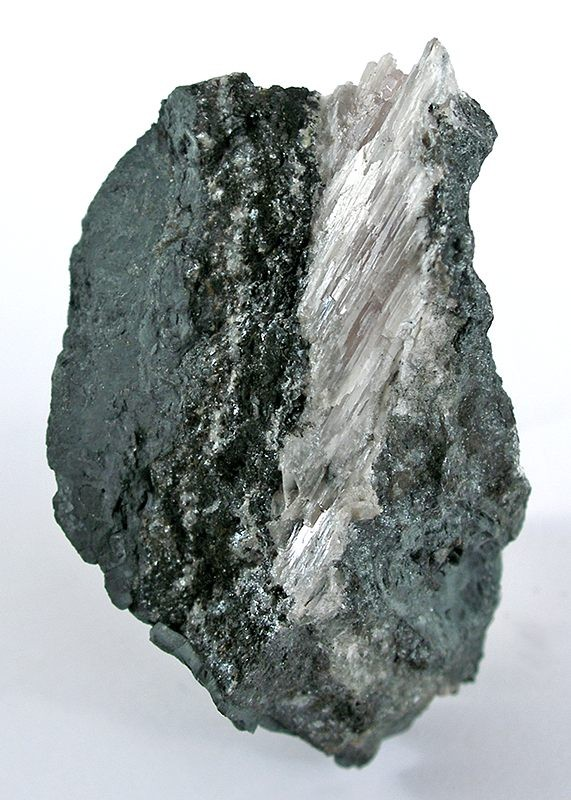
Mendipite in a seam of ore from Mendip Hills, Somerset, England, UK

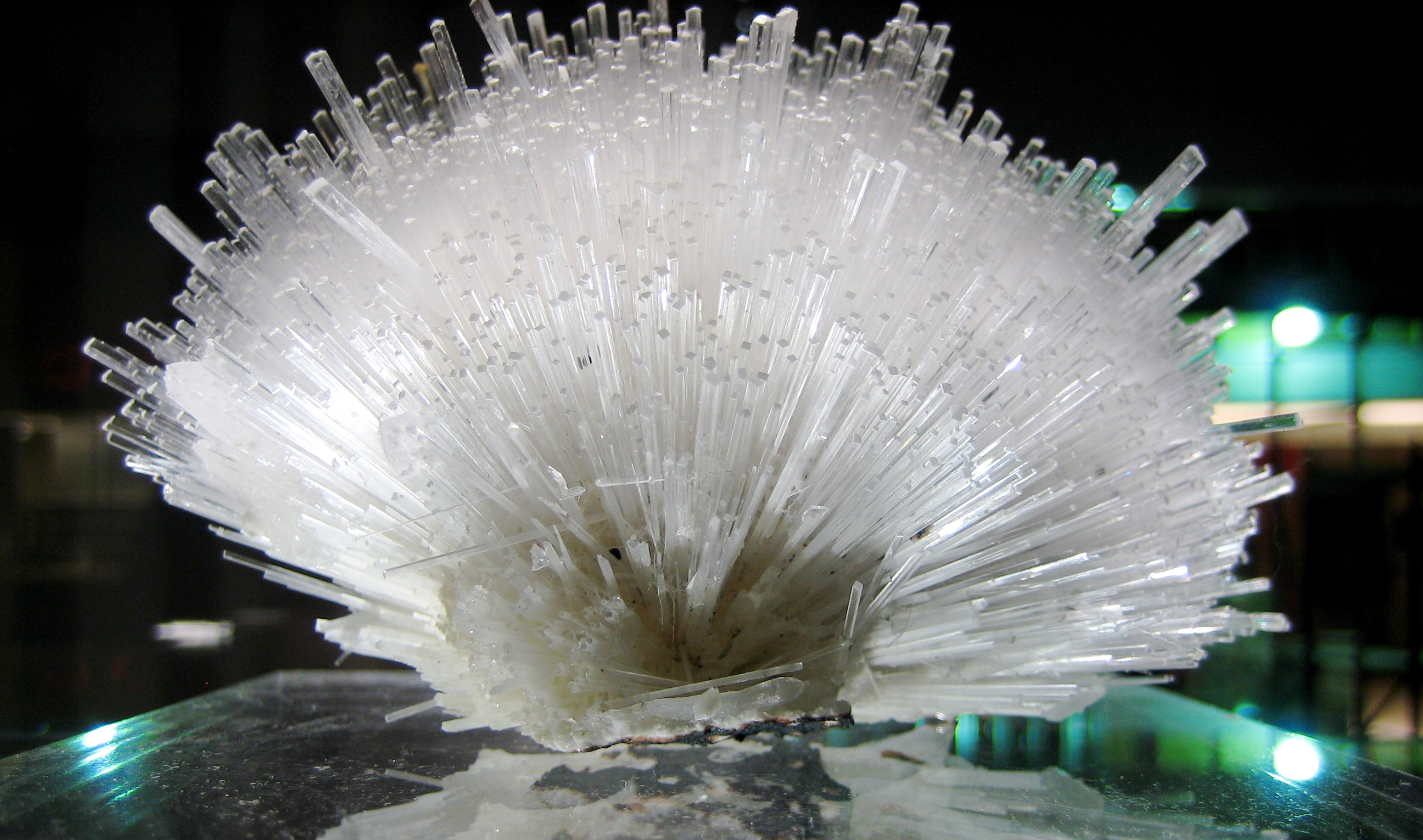
Mesolite at the Carnegie Museum of Natural History, Pittsburgh, Pennsylvania, USA

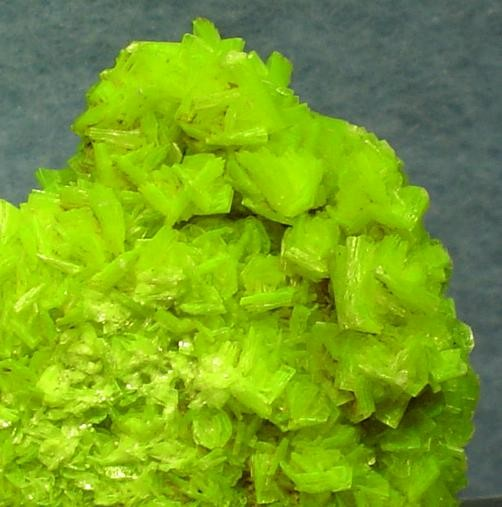
Meta-autunite, Assunção Mine, Sátão, Portugal. Detail; specimen size 4.1 × 2.9 × 1.7 cm

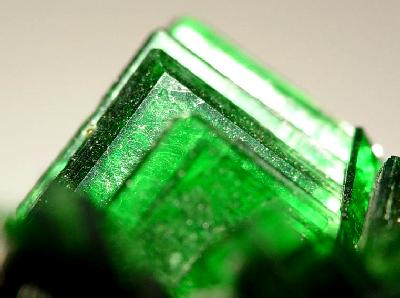
Metatorbernite, Kolwezi, Democratic Republic of the Congo zoned crystal, about 1 cm

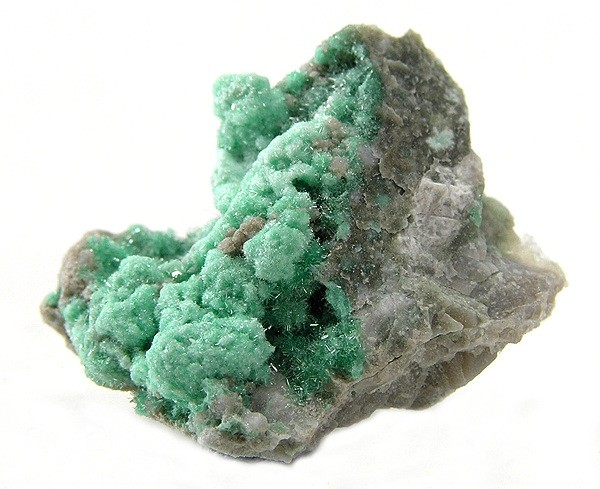
Metavariscite from Lucin District, Pilot Range, Box Elder County, Utah, USA

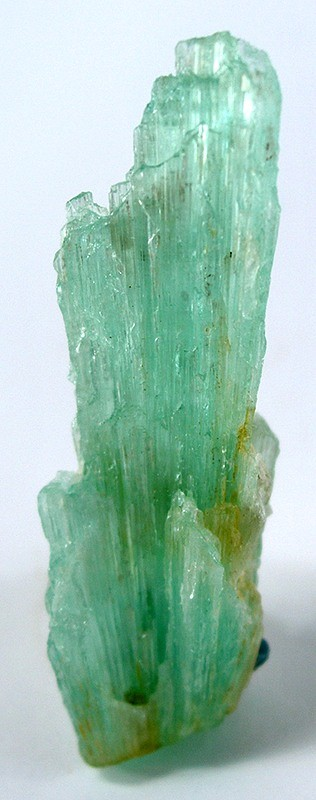
Metavauxite, Siglo XX Mine, Llallagua, Bolivia. Size: 4.2 × 1.2 × 1.1 cm

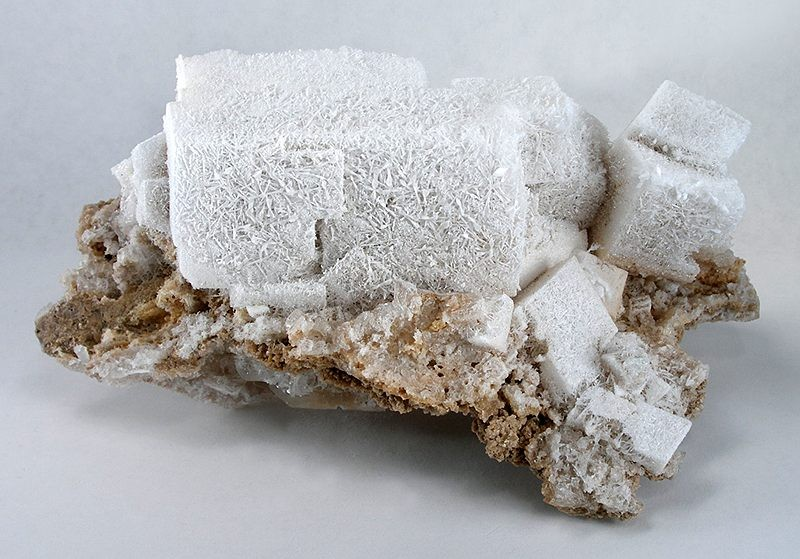
Meyerhofferite after inyoite, Salta, Argentina. Size: 17.7 × 9.2 × 8.1 cm

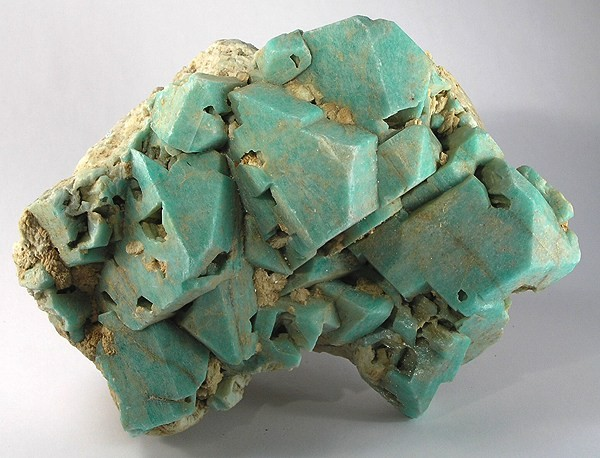
Microcline, var. amazonite, Konso, Sidamo-Borana Province, Ethiopia

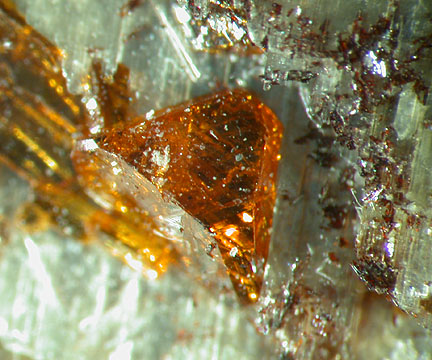
Golden-orange microlite on pale-green muscovite, Minas Gerais, Brazil. Field of view about 1 cm

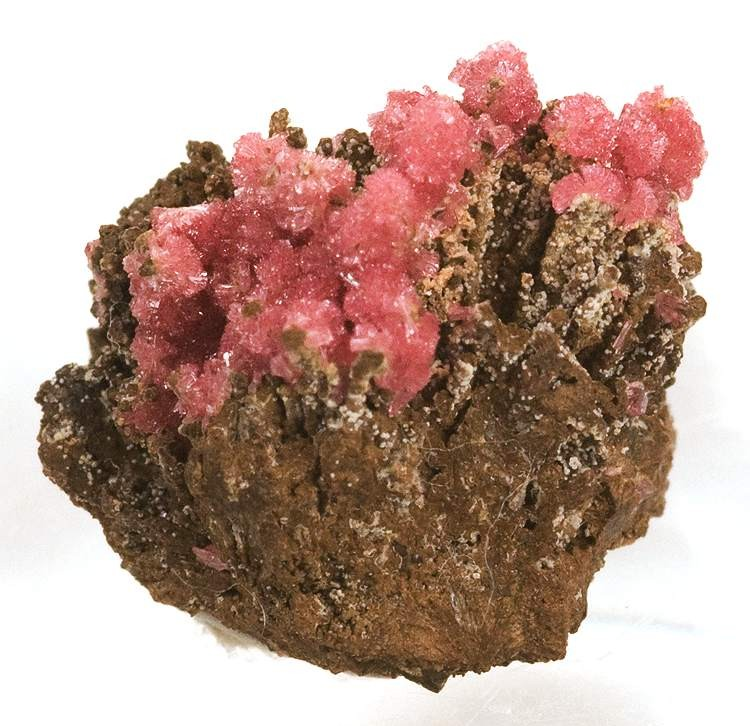
Sprays of vivid pink crystals of miguelromeroite crystals

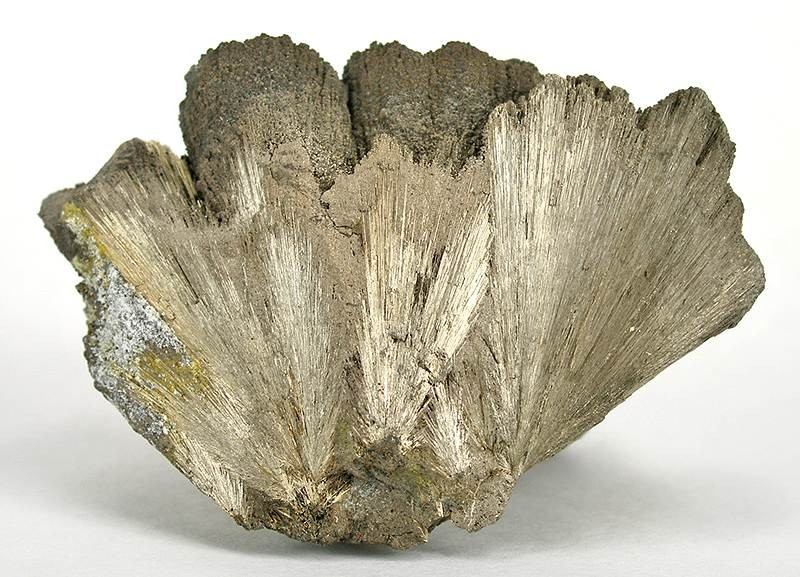
Lamellar growth millerite

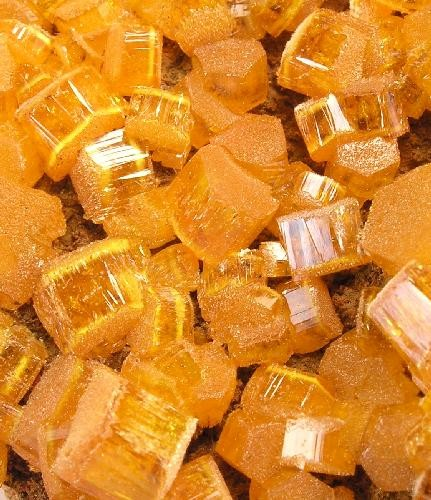
Mimetite crystals to 0.5 cm, Pingtouling Mine, Guangdong Province, China

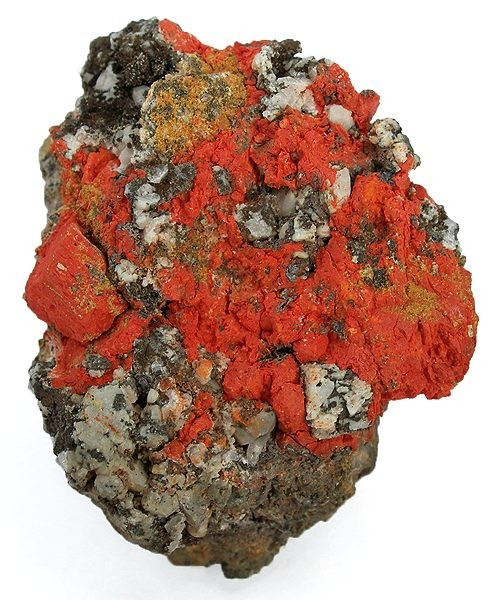
Minium, Old Yuma mine, Saguaro National Park, Arizona. Size: 4.8 × 3.8 × 3.4 cm

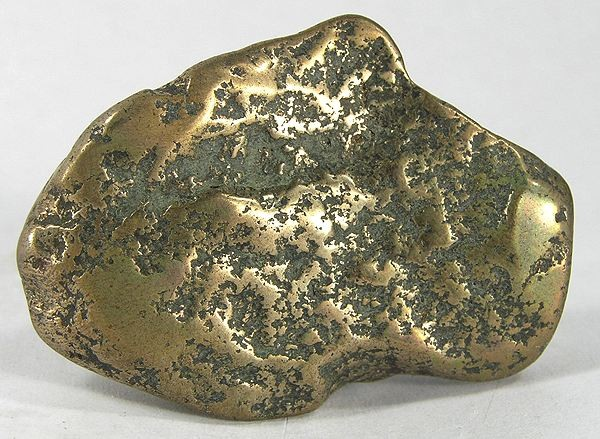
"Mohawkite," a rare mixture of copper and copper arsenides, is named after Mohawk, Michigan. Size: 4.8 x 3.7 x 1.3 cm

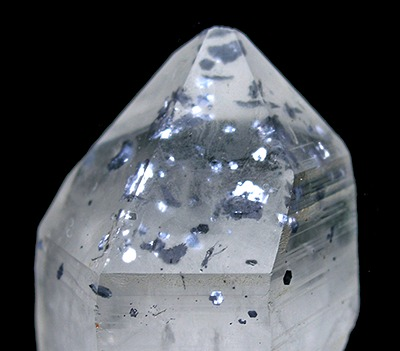
Molybdenite in quartz, Coquimbo Region, Chile. Size 3.2 × 3.2 cm

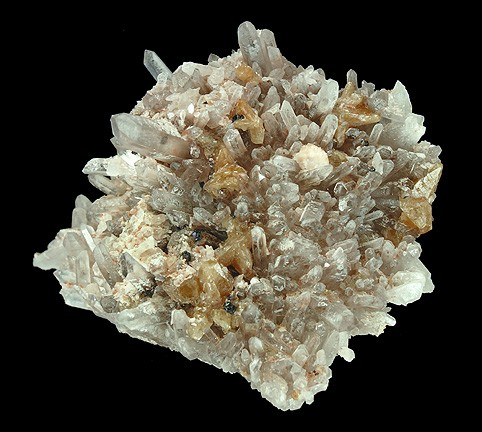
Sharp, orange-pink, twinned crystals of monazite-(Ce) on quartz crystals on matrix

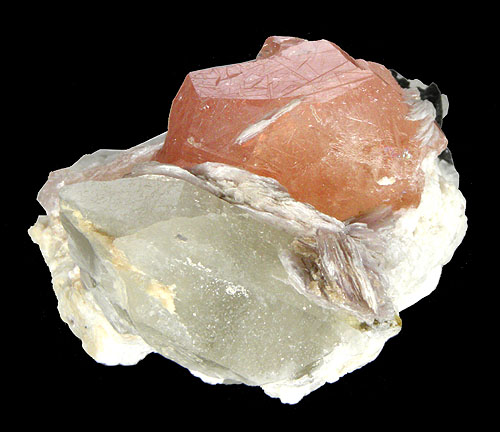
Rich pink, translucent, hexagonal beryl (var: morganite) crystals sit atop a matrix of off-white albite (var cleavelandite) crystals with quartz and minor muscovite and schorl

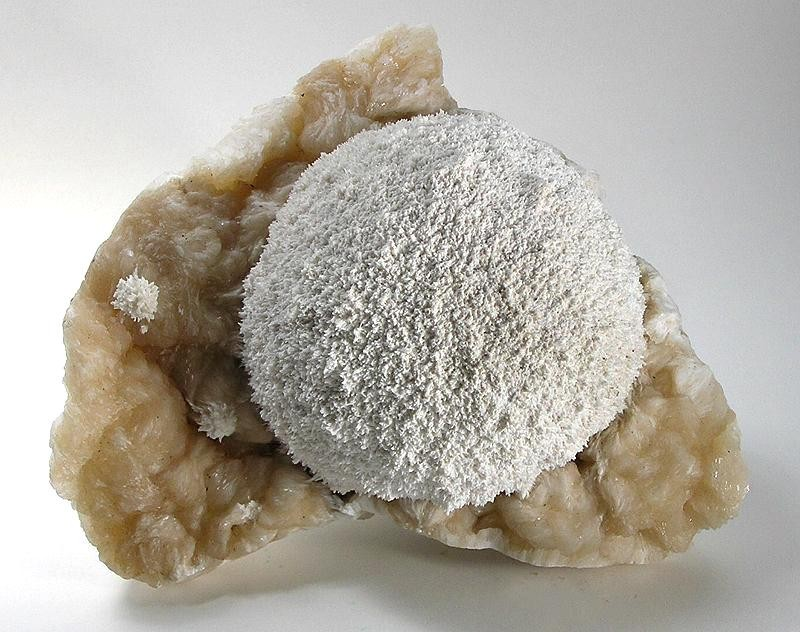
Mordenite sits on a field of creamy stilbite crystals

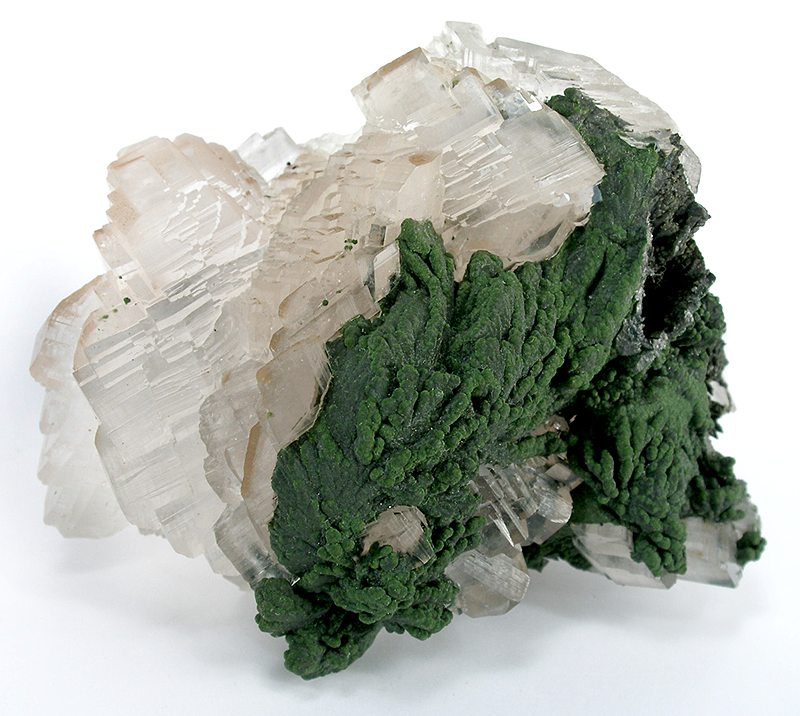
Colorless rhombs of calcite are partially covered by rich green mottramite

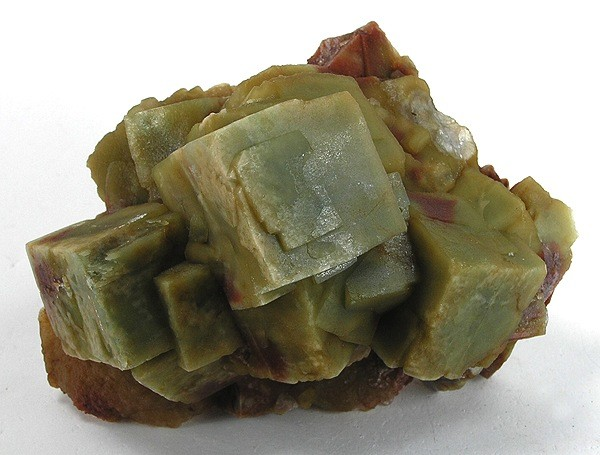
Mozartite and apophyllite-(KF) from Jalgaon District, Maharashtra, India

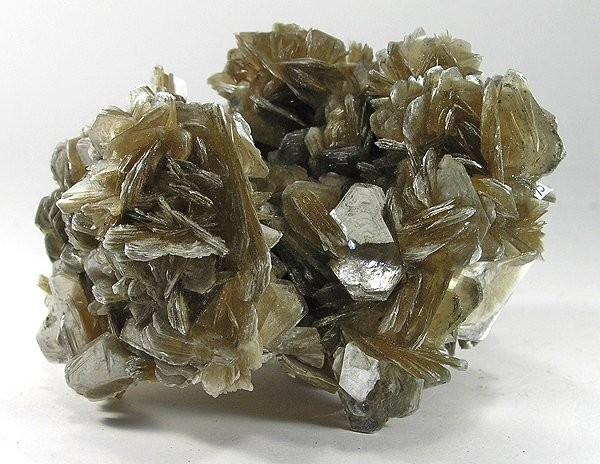
A cluster of muscovite crystals, from Brazil

1. Macaulayite (IMA1981-062) 9.EC.65
2. Macdonaldite (rhodesite: IMA1964-010) 9.EB.05
3. Macedonite (oxide perovskite: IMA1970-010) 4.CC.35
  (IUPAC: lead titanium trioxide)
4. Macfallite (IMA1974-057) 9.BG.15
  (IUPAC: dicalcium trimanganese(III) tetraoxysilicate heptaoxodisilicate trihydroxyl)
5. Machatschkiite (IMA1976-010) 8.CJ.35
  (IUPAC: hexacalcium arsenate tri(hydroxoarsenate) phosphate pentadecahydrate)
6. Machiite (schreyerite: IMA2016-067) 4.0 [no] [no]
  (IUPAC: dialuminium trititanium nonaoxide)
7. Mackayite (Y: 1944) 4.JL.10
  (IUPAC: iron(III) hydro ditellurium(IV) pentaoxide)
8. Mackinawite (IMA1967 s.p., 1964) 2.CC.25
9. Macphersonite (IMA1982-105) 5.BF.40
  (IUPAC: tetralead dihydro sulfate dicarbonate)
10. Macquartite (IMA1979-037) 9.HH.05
  (IUPAC: dicopper heptalead tetrachromate di(tetraoxysilicate) dihydroxyl)
11. Madeiraite (wöhlerite: IMA2021-077) [no] [no]
12. Madocite (madocite: IMA1966-015) 2.LB.30
  (Pb_{19}(Sb,As)_{16}S_{43})
13. Magadiite (IMA1967-017) 9.EA.20
14. Magbasite (IMA1968 s.p., 1965) 9.HA.25
15. Magganasite (IMA2021-112) 8.BN. [no] [no]
16. Maghagendorfite^{Q} (alluaudite: IMA19 s.p., IMA1979 s.p.) 8.AC.10
17. Maghemite (spinel: 1927) 4.BB.15
  (((Fe^{3+})_{0.67}◻_{0.33})(Fe^{3+})_{2}O_{4})
18. Maghrebite (laueite, laueite: IMA2005-044) 8.DC.30 [no]
  (IUPAC: magnesium dialuminium dihydro diarsenate octahydrate)
19. Magnanelliite (alcaparrosaite: IMA2019-006) 7.0 [no] [no]
  (IUPAC: tripotassium diiron(III) hydro tetrasulfate diwater)
20. Magnéliite (IMA2021-111) 4.BB. [no] [no]
  (IUPAC: dititanium(III) dititanium(IV) heptaoxide)
21. Magnesioalterite (alterite: IMA2020-050) [no] [no]
22. Magnesio-arfvedsonite [Na-amphibole: IMA2013-137, IMA2012 s.p., 1957] 9.DE.25
23. Magnesioaubertite (aubertite: IMA1982-015) 7.DB.05
  (IUPAC: magnesium aluminium chloro disulfate tetradecahydrate)
24. Magnesiobeltrandoite-2N3S (högbomite: IMA2016-073) 4.0 [no] [no]
25. Magnesiobermanite (arthurite: IMA2018-115) 8.0 [no] [no]
  (IUPAC: magnesium dimanganese(III) dihydro diphosphate tetrahydrate)
26. Magnesiocanutite (alluaudite: IMA2016-057) 8.0 [no] [no]
  (IUPAC: sodium vacancy magnesium dimanganese diarsenate dihydroxoarsenate)
27. Magnesiocarpholite (carpholite: IMA1978-027) 9.DB.05
  (IUPAC: magnesium dialuminium hexaoxydisilicate tetrahydroxyl)
28. Magnesiochloritoid (IMA1987-J, 1983) 9.AF.85
  (IUPAC: magnesium dialuminium oxy(tetraoxysilicate) dihydroxyl)
29. Magnesiochlorophoenicite (chlorophoenicite: IMA1981 s.p., 1935 Rd) 8.BE.35
30. Magnesiochromite (spinel, spinel: 1873) 4.BB.05
  (IUPAC: magnesium dichromium(III) tetraoxide)
31. Magnesiocopiapite (copiapite: 1939) 7.DB.35
  (IUPAC: magnesium tetrairon(III) dihydro hexasulfate icosahydrate)
32. Magnesiocoulsonite (spinel, spinel: IMA1994-034) 4.BB.05
  (IUPAC: magnesium divanadium tetraoxide)
33. Magnesiodumortierite (dumortierite: IMA1992-050 Rd) 9.AJ.10 [no]
34. Magnesio-ferri-fluoro-hornblende [Ca-amphibole: IMA2014-091] 9.D [no] [no]
35. Magnesio-ferri-hornblende [Ca-amphibole: IMA2021-100] 9.DE.10 [no] [no]
36. Magnesioferrite (spinel, spinel: 1859) 4.BB.05
  (IUPAC: magnesium diiron(III) tetraoxide)
37. Magnesiofluckite (fluckite: IMA2017-103) 8.0 [no] [no]
  (IUPAC: calcium magnesium di(hydroxoarsenate) diwater)
38. Magnesio-fluoro-arfvedsonite [Na-amphibole: IMA2012 s.p., fluoromagnesioarfvedsonite (IMA1998-056)] 9.DE.25 [no]
39. Magnesio-fluoro-hastingsite [Ca-amphibole: IMA2012 s.p., fluoro-magnesiohastingsite (IMA2005-002)] 9.DE.15
40. Magnesiofoitite (tourmaline: IMA1998-037 Rd) 9.CK.05 [no]
41. Magnesio-hastingsite [Ca-amphibole: IMA2012 s.p., IMA1997 s.p., magnesiohastingsite (1928)] 9.DE.15
42. Magnesiohatertite (alluaudite: IMA2016-078) 8.0 [no] [no]
  (NaNaCa(MgFe^{3+})(AsO_{4})_{3})
43. Magnesiohögbomite (högbomite, magnesiohögbomite) 4.CB.20
  1. Magnesiohögbomite-2N2S (IMA2001 s.p., 1916 Rd) 4.CB.20
  2. Magnesiohögbomite-2N3S (IMA2001 s.p., 1963 Rd) 4.CB.20 [no]
  3. Magnesiohögbomite-2N4S (IMA2010-084) 4.CB.20 [no]
  4. Magnesiohögbomite-6N6S (IMA2001 s.p., 1990 Rd) 4.CB.20 [no]
44. Magnesio-hornblende [Ca-amphibole: IMA2017-059, IMA2012 s.p., IMA1997 s.p., magnesiohornblende (1965)] 9.DE.10
45. Magnesiohulsite (hulsite: IMA1983-074) 6.AB.45
46. Magnesiokoritnigite (koritnigite: IMA2013-049) 8.0 [no] [no]
  (IUPAC: magnesium hydroxoarsenate monohydrate)
47. Magnesioleydetite (leydetite: IMA2017-063) 7.0 [no] [no]
  (IUPAC: magnesium uranyl disulfate undecahydrate)
48. Magnesio-lucchesiite (tourmaline: IMA2019-025) 9.CK. [no] [no]
49. Magnesioneptunite (neptunite: IMA2009-009) 9.EH.05 [no] [no]
50. Magnesionigerite (nigerite, magnesionigerite) 4.FC.20
  1. Magnesionigerite-2N1S (IMA2001 s.p., IMA1988-010) 4.FC.20
  2. Magnesionigerite-6N6S (IMA2001 s.p., 1989) 4.FC.20 [no]
51. Magnesiopascoite (pascoite: IMA2007-025) 4.HC.05
  (Ca_{2}Mg(V^{5+})_{10}O_{28}·16H_{2}O)
52. Magnesio-riebeckite [Na-amphibole: IMA2012 s.p., IMA1997 s.p., magnesioriebeckite (1957)] 9.DE.25
53. Magnesiorowlandite-(Y) (rowlandite: IMA2012-010) 9.H?. [no]
  (IUPAC: tetrayttrium (magnesium,iron) difluoro di(heptadisilicate))
54. Magnesiostaurolite (IMA1992-035) 9.AF.30 [no]
55. Magnesiotaaffeite (taaffeite, magnesiotaaffeite) 04.FC.25
  1. Magnesiotaaffeite-2N2S (IMA2001 s.p., 1951) 4.FC.25 [no]
    (IUPAC: trimagnesium beryllium octaluminium hexadecaoxide)
  2. Magnesiotaaffeite-6N3S (IMA2001 s.p., IMA1966-041) 4.FC.25
    (IUPAC: dimagnesium beryllium hexaluminium dodecaoxide)
56. Magnesiovesuvianite (vesuvianite: IMA2015-104) 9.BG. [no] [no]
57. Magnesiovoltaite (voltaite: IMA2015–095) 7.0 [no] [no]
58. Magnesiozippeite (zippeite: IMA1971-007 Rd) 7.EC.05
  (Mg(UO_{2})_{2}(SO_{4})O_{2}·3.5H_{2}O)
59. Magnesite (calcite: IMA1962 s.p., 1808) 5.AB.05
  (IUPAC: magnesium carbonate)
60. Magnetite (spinel, spinel: 1789) 4.BB.05
  (IUPAC: iron(II) diiron(III) tetraoxide)
61. Magnetoplumbite (magnetoplumbite: 1925) 4.CC.45
  (IUPAC: lead dodecairon(III) nonadecaoxide)
62. Magnioursilite (ursilite: 1957) 9.AK.35 [no] [no]
  (IUPAC: tetramagnesio tetrauranyl penta(pentaoxydisilicate) hexahydroxyl icosahydrate)
63. Magnolite (tellurite: 1878) 4.JK.60
  (IUPAC: (dimercury) tellurite)
64. Magnussonite (IMA1984 s.p., 1957 Rd) 4.JB.15
65. Mahnertite (IMA1994-035) 8.DH.45
  (IUPAC: (sodium, calcium, potassium) tricopper chloro diarsenate pentahydrate)
66. Maikainite (germanite: IMA1992-038) 2.CB.30
  (IUPAC: decacopper triiron molybdenum trigermanide hexadecasulfide)
67. Majakite (IMA1974-038) 2.AC.25e
  (IUPAC: palladium nickel arsenide)
68. Majindeite (nolanite: IMA2012-079) 4.CB.40 [no] [no]
  (IUPAC: dimagnesium trimolybdenum octaoxide)
69. Majorite (garnet, garnet: IMA1969-018) 9.AD.25
  (IUPAC: trimagnesio (magnesiosilicon) tri(tetraoxysilicate))
70. Majzlanite (IMA2018-016) 7.0 [no] [no]
  (IUPAC: dipotassium sodium (zinc sodium) calcium tetrasulfate)
71. Makarochkinite (sapphirine: IMA2002-009a) 9.DH.40 [no]
72. Makatite (IMA1969-003) 9.EE.45
  (IUPAC: disodium octaoxy tetrasilicate dihydroxyl tetrahydrate)
73. Mäkinenite (millerite: IMA1967 s.p., 1964) 2.CC.20
  (IUPAC: nickel selenide)
74. Makotoite (IMA2020-071) 2.0 [no] [no]
75. Makovickyite (pavonite: IMA1986-027) 2.JA.05d
76. Malachite (malachite: 1747) 5.BA.10
  (IUPAC: dicopper dihydro carbonate)
77. Malanite (spinel, linnaeite: IMA1995-003) 2.DA.05
  (Cu^{1+}(Ir^{3+}Pt^{4+})S_{4})
78. Malayaite (titanite: IMA1964-024) 9.AG.15
  (IUPAC: calcium tin oxytetraoxysilicate)
79. Maldonite (metalloid alloy: 1870) 2.AA.40
  (IUPAC: digold bismuthide)
80. Maleevite (danburite: IMA2002-027) 9.FA.65
  (IUPAC: barium octaoxy diboro disilicate)
81. Maletoyvayamite (IMA2019-021) 2.0 [no] [no]
  (IUPAC: trigold tetraselenide hexatelluride)
82. Malhmoodite (IMA2002-D, IMA1992-001) 8.CE.75
  (IUPAC: iron(II) zirconium diphosphate tetrahydrate)
83. Malinkoite (beryllonite: IMA2000-009) 9.FA.10 [no]
  (IUPAC: sodium tetraoxy borosilicate)
84. Malladrite (fluorosilicate: 1926) 3.CH.05
  (IUPAC: disodium hexafluorosilicate)
85. Mallardite (melanterite: 1879) 7.CB.35
  (IUPAC: manganese(II) sulfate heptahydrate)
86. Mallestigite (fleischerite: IMA1996-043) 7.DF.25
  (IUPAC: trilead antimony hexahydro sulfate arsenate trihydrate)
87. Malyshevite (IMA2006-012) 2.GA.25 [no]
  (IUPAC: palladium copper trisulfa bismuthide)
88. Mambertiite (gelosaite: IMA2013-098) 4.0 [no] [no]
  (BiMo^{5+}_{2.8}O_{8}(OH))
89. Mammothite (IMA1983-076a) 7.BC.60
90. Manaevite-(Ce) (vesuvianite: IMA2018-046) 9.BG. [no] [no]
91. Manaksite (litidionite: IMA1990-024) 9.DG.70
  (IUPAC: potassium sodium manganese(II) decaoxy tetrasilicate)
92. Manandonite (serpentine: 1912) 9.ED.15
  (IUPAC: dilithium tetraluminium decaoxy (boroaluminodisilicate) octahydroxyl)
93. Mandarinoite (mandarinoite: IMA1977-049) 4.JH.15
  (IUPAC: diiron(III) triselenite hexahydrate)
94. Maneckiite (wicksite: IMA2015-056) 8.0 [no] [no]
95. Manganarsite (IMA1985-037) 4.JB.10
  (IUPAC: trimanganese(II) tetrahydro diarsenic(III) tetraoxide)
96. Manganbabingtonite (rhodonite: IMA1971 s.p., 1966) 9.DK.05
97. Manganbelyankinite^{Q} (Y: 1957) 4.FM.25
98. Manganberzeliite (garnet: 1878) 8.AC.25
  (IUPAC: (sodium dicalcium) dimanganese(II) triarsenate)
99. Manganese^{D} (Y: 2001) 1.AE.30 [no] [no]
100. Manganflurlite (flurlite: IMA2017-076) 8.0 [no] [no]
101. Mangangordonite (laueite, laueite: IMA1989-023) 8.DC.30
  (IUPAC: manganese dialuminium dihydro diphosphate octahydrate)
102. Manganhumite (humite: IMA1969-021) 9.AF.50
  (IUPAC: heptamanganese(II) tri(tetraoxysilicate) dihydroxyl)
103. Manganiakasakaite-(La) (epidote: IMA2017-028) 9.B?. [no] [no]
104. Manganiandrosite (epidote, allanite) 9.BG.05
  1. Manganiandrosite-(Ce) (IMA2002-049) 9.BG.05
  2. Manganiandrosite-(La) (IMA1994-048) 9.BG.05b [no]
105. Manganiceladonite (mica: IMA2015-052) 9.E?. [no] [no]
106. Mangani-dellaventuraite [O-dominant amphibole: IMA2012 s.p., dellaventuraite (IMA2003-061)] 9.DE.25 [no]
107. Manganilvaite (ilvaite: IMA2002-016) 9.BE.07
  (IUPAC: calcium iron(II) iron(III) manganese(II) heptaoxodisilicate oxohydroxyl)
108. Mangani-obertiite [O-dominant amphibole: IMA2014 s.p., ferri-obertiite (IMA2012 s.p.), obertiite (IMA1998-046)] 9.DE.25 [no]
109. Mangani-pargasite (Ca-amphibole: IMA2018-151) 9.D?. [no] [no]
110. Manganite ("O(OH)" group: 1826) 4.FD.15
  (IUPAC: hydromanganese(III) oxide)
111. Manganlotharmeyerite (tsumcorite: IMA2001-026) 8.CG.15
  (IUPAC: calcium dimanganese(III) dihydro diarsenate)
112. Manganoarrojadite-(KNa) (arrojadite: IMA2020-003) 8.0 [no] [no]
113. Manganobadalovite (alluaudite: IMA2020-035) [no] [no]
114. Manganoblödite (blödite: IMA2012-029) 7.C?. [no] [no]
  (IUPAC: disodium managanese disulfate tetrahydrate)
115. Manganochromite (spinel, spinel: IMA1975-020) 4.BB.05
  (IUPAC: manganese(II) dichromium tetraoxide)
116. Manganoeudialyte (eudialyte: IMA2009-039) 9.CO.10 [no]
117. Mangano-ferri-eckermannite [Na-amphibole: IMA2012 s.p., kôzulite (IMA1968-028)] 9.DE.25
118. Manganohörnesite (vivianite: IMA2007 s.p., 1951) 8.CE.40
  (IUPAC: trimanganese(II) diarsenate octahydrate)
119. Manganokaskasite (valleriite: IMA2013-026) 2.0 [no]
  ((Mo,Nb)S_{2}•(Mn_{(1−x)}Al_{x})(OH)_{(2+x)})
120. Manganokhomyakovite (eudialyte: IMA1998-043) 9.CO.10 [no]
121. Manganokukisvumite (IMA2002-029) 9.DB.20
122. Manganolangbeinite (langbeinite: 1926) 7.AC.10
  (IUPAC: dipotassium dimanganese(II) trisulfate)
123. Mangano-mangani-ungarettiite [O-dominant amphibole: IMA2012 s.p., ungarettiite (IMA1994-004)] 9.DE.25 [no]
124. Manganonaujakasite (IMA1999-031) 9.EG.10 [no]
125. Manganoneptunite (neptunite: IMA2007 s.p., 1923) 9.EH.05
126. Manganonordite-(Ce) (nordite: IMA1997-007) 9.DO.15 [no]
127. Manganoquadratite (quadratite: IMA2011-008) 2.GC.25 [no] [no]
  (IUPAC: silver manganese trisulfa arsenide)
128. Manganosegelerite (overite: IMA1984-055) 8.DH.20
  (IUPAC: dimanganese(II) iron(III) hydro diphosphate tetrahydrate)
129. Manganoshadlunite^{N} (Y: 1973) 2.BB.15 [no]
  ((Mn,Pb,Cd)(Cu,Fe)_{8}S_{8})
130. Manganosite (rocksalt, periclase: 1874) 4.AB.25
  (IUPAC: manganese(II) oxide)
131. Manganostibite (Y: 1884) 4.BA.10
  (IUPAC: heptamanganese(II) antimony(V) arsenic(V) dodecaoxide)
132. Manganotychite (northupite: IMA1989-039) 5.BF.05
  (IUPAC: hexasodium dimanganese(II) tetracarbonate sulfate)
133. Manganvesuvianite (vesuvianite: IMA2000-040) 9.BG.35 [no]
134. Mangazeite (IMA2005-021a) 7.DE.05
  (IUPAC: dialuminium tetrahydro sulfate trihydrate)
135. Manitobaite (alluaudite: IMA2008-064) 8.AC.18 [no] [no]
  (IUPAC: hexadecasodium pentacosamanganese(II) octaluminium tricontaphosphate)
136. Manjiroite (hollandite, coronadite: IMA1966-009) 4.DK.05a
137. Mannardite (hollandite, coronadite: IMA1983-013) 4.DK.05b
138. Mansfieldite (Y: 1948) 8.CD.10
  (IUPAC: aluminium arsenate dihydrate)
139. Mantienneite (IMA1983-048) 8.DH.35
  (IUPAC: potassium dimagnesium dialuminium titanium trihydro tetraphosphate pentadecahydrate)
140. Maohokite (post-spinel: IMA2017-047) 4.0 [no] [no]
  (IUPAC: magnesium diiron tetraoxide)
141. Maoniupingite-(Ce) (chevkinite: IMA2003-017) 9.BE.70 [no]
142. Mapimite (IMA1978-070) 8.DC.55
  (IUPAC: dizinc triiron(III) tetrahydro triarsenate decahydrate)
143. Mapiquiroite (crichtonite: IMA2013-010) 4.0 [no] [no]
144. Marathonite (IMA2016-080) 2.0 [no] [no]
  (Pd_{25}Ge_{9})
145. Marcasite (marcasite: 1751) 2.EB.10a
  (IUPAC: iron disulfide)
146. Marchettiite (IMA2017-066) 10.0 [no] [no]
  (IUPAC: ammonium hydrogen urate)
147. Marcobaldiite (geocronite: IMA2015-109) 2.0 [no] [no]
148. Marécottite (IMA2001-056) 7.EC.15
  (IUPAC: trimagnesium hexaoxo octauranyl dihydro tetrasulfate octacosahydrate)
149. Margaritasite (IMA1980-093) 4.HB.05
  (IUPAC: dicesium diuranyl divanadate monohydrate)
150. Margarite (mica: IMA1998 s.p., 1821) 9.EC.30
  (IUPAC: calcium dialuminium dialuminodisilicate decaoxydihydroxyl)
151. Margarosanite (Y: 1916) 9.CA.25
  (IUPAC: dicalcium lead nonaoxy trisilicate)
152. Mariakrite (hydrotalcite: IMA2021-097)
153. Marialite (scapolite: 1866) 9.FB.15
154. Marićite (IMA1976-024) 8.AC.20
  (IUPAC: sodium iron(II) phosphate)
155. Maricopaite (zeolitic tectosilicate: IMA1985-036) 9.GD.35
156. Mariinskite (olivine: IMA2011-057) 4.B?. [no]
  (IUPAC: dichromium beryllium tetraoxide)
157. Marinaite (ludwigite: IMA2016-021) 6.0 [no] [no]
  (IUPAC: dicopper iron(III) dioxoborate)
158. Marinellite (cancrinite-sodalite: IMA2002-021) 9.FB.05 [no]
159. Markascherite (IMA2010-051) 7.G?. [no] [no]
  (IUPAC: tricopper tetrahydro molybdate)
160. Markcooperite (uranyl-tellurium oxysalt: IMA2009-045) 7.E?. [no] [no]
  (IUPAC: dilead uranyl tellurium hexaoxide)
161. Markeyite (markeyite: IMA2016-090) 5.0 [no] [no]
  (IUPAC: nonacalcium tetrauranyl tridecacarbonate octacosahydrate)
162. Markhininite (IMA2012-040) 7.0 [no] [no]
  (IUPAC: thallium bismuth disulfate)
163. Marklite (IMA2015-101) 5.0 [no] [no]
  (IUPAC: pentacopper hexahydro dicarbonate hexahydrate)
164. Marokite (post-spinel: IMA1963-005) 4.BC.05
  (IUPAC: calcium dimanganese(III) tetraoxide)
165. Marrite (Y: 1905) 2.JB.15
  (IUPAC: silver lead trisulfa arsenide)
166. Marrucciite (IMA2006-015) 2.JB.60 [no]
  (Hg_{3}Pb_{16}Sb_{18}S_{46})
167. Marshite (sphalerite: 1892) 3.AA.05
  (IUPAC: copper iodide)
168. Marsturite (rhodonite: IMA1977-047) 9.DK.05
169. Marthozite (IMA1968-016) 4.JJ.05
  (IUPAC: copper(II) triuranyl dioxo diselenite octahydrate)
170. Martinandresite (zeolitic tectosilicate: IMA2017-038) 9.G? [no] [no]
171. Martinite (gyrolite: IMA2001-059) 9.EE.80 [no]
172. Martyite (volborthite: IMA2007-026) 8.FD.05
  (IUPAC: trizinc dihydro pyrovanadate dihydrate)
173. Marumoite (IMA1998-004) 2.HC.05g [no]
  (Pb_{32}As_{40}S_{92})
174. Maruyamaite (tourmaline: IMA2013-123) 9.CK. [no] [no]
175. Mascagnite (arcanite: 1777) 7.AD.05
  (IUPAC: diammonium sulfate)
176. Maslovite (pyrite: IMA1978-002) 2.EB.25
  (IUPAC: platinum bismuthide telluride)
177. Massicot (Y: 1841) 4.AC.25
  (IUPAC: lead oxide)
178. Masutomilite (mica: IMA1974-046) 9.EC.20
179. Masuyite (Y: 1947) 4.GB.35
  (IUPAC: lead triuranyl dihydro trioxide trihydrate)
180. Mathesiusite (mathesiusite: IMA2013-046) 7.DG. [no] [no]
  (IUPAC: pentapotassium tetrauranyl tetrasulfate (vanadium pentaoxide) tetrawater)
181. Mathewrogersite (IMA1984-042) 9.CJ.55
182. Mathiasite (crichtonite: IMA1982-087) 4.CC.40
183. Matildite (IMA1982 s.p., 1883) 2.JA.20
  (IUPAC: silver disulfa bismuthide)
184. Matioliite (dufrenite: IMA2005-011) 8.DK.15 [no]
  (IUPAC: sodium magnesium pentaluminium hexahydro tetraphosphate dihydrate)
185. Matlockite (matlockite: 1851) 3.DC.25
  (IUPAC: lead chloride fluoride)
186. Matsubaraite (chevkinite: IMA2000-027) 9.BE.70 [no]
  (IUPAC: tetrastrontium pentatitanium octaoxy di(heptaoxodisilicate))
187. Mattagamite (marcasite: IMA1972-003) 2.EB.10a
  (IUPAC: cobalt ditelluride)
188. Matteuccite (Y: 1950) 7.CD.05
  (IUPAC: sodium hydroxosulfate monohydrate)
189. Mattheddleite (apatite, tritomite: IMA1985-019) 9.AH.25
  (Pb_{5}(SiO_{4})_{1.5}(SO_{4})_{1.5}Cl)
190. Matthiasweilite (IMA2021-069) [no] [no]
191. Matulaite (IMA1977-013 Rd) 8.DK.30
  (IUPAC: iron(III) heptaluminium octahydro tetraphosphate di(hydroxophosphate) octawater octahydrate)
192. Matyhite (whitlockite: IMA2015-121) 8.0 [no] [no]
  (Ca_{9}(Ca_{0.5}☐_{0.5})Fe^{2+}(PO_{4})_{7})
193. Maucherite (metalloid alloy: 1913) 2.AB.15
  (IUPAC: undecanickel octarsenide)
194. Mauriziodiniite (lucabindiite: IMA2019-036) 4.0 [no] [no]
  (IUPAC: ammonio iodo di(diarsenic trioxide))
195. Mavlyanovite (silicide: IMA2008-026) 1.BB.05
  (IUPAC: pentamanganese trisilicide)
196. Mawbyite (tsumcorite: IMA1988-049) 8.CG.15
  (IUPAC: lead diiron(III) dihydro diarsenate)
197. Mawsonite (IMA1964-030) 2.CB.20
  (IUPAC: hexacopper diiron tin octasulfide)
198. Maxwellite (titanite: IMA1987-044) 8.BH.10
  (IUPAC: sodium iron(III) fluoro arsenate)
199. Mayingite (pyrite: IMA1993-016) 2.EB.25
  (IUPAC: iridium bismuthide telluride)
200. Mazzettiite (petrovicite: IMA2004-003) 2.LB.40
  (IUPAC: trisilver mercury lead antimonide pentatelluride)
201. Mazzite (zeolitic tectosilicate) 9.GC.20
  1. Mazzite-Mg (IMA1973-045) 9.GC.20
  2. Mazzite-Na (IMA2003-058) 9.GC.20 [no]

=== Mb – Me ===
1. Mbobomkulite (chalcoalumite: IMA1979-078) 5.ND.10
2. Mcallisterite (IMA1963-012) 6.FA.10
3. Mcalpineite (tellurium oxysalt: IMA1992-025) 7.DE.55
  (IUPAC: tricopper tellurium(VI) hexaoxide)
4. Mcauslanite (IMA1986-051) 8.DB.60
  (IUPAC: triiron(II) dialuminium fluoro triphosphate hydroxophosphate octadecahydrate)
5. Mcbirneyite (howardevansite: IMA1985-007) 8.AB.35
  (IUPAC: tricopper divanadate)
6. Mcconnellite (IMA1967-037) 4.AB.15
  (IUPAC: copper(I) chromium(III) dioxide)
7. Mccrillisite (IMA1991-023) 8.CA.20
8. Mcgillite (pyrosmalite: IMA1979-024) 9.EE.10
9. Mcgovernite (hematolite: 1927) 8.BE.45
10. Mcguinnessite (malachite: IMA1977-027) 5.BA.10
  (IUPAC: copper magnesium dihydro carbonate)
11. Mckelveyite-(Y) (IMA1964-025 Rd) 5.CC.05
12. Mckinstryite (IMA1966-012) 2.BA.40
  (IUPAC: pentasilver tricopper tetrasulfide)
13. Mcnearite (IMA1980-017) 8.CJ.55
  (IUPAC: sodium pentacalcium arsenate tetra(hydroxoarsenate) tetrahydrate)
14. Medaite (medaite: IMA1979-062) 9.BJ.30
  (IUPAC: hexamanganese(II) vanadatopentasilicate octadecaoxy hydroxyl)
15. Medenbachite (IMA1993-048) 8.BK.10
  (IUPAC: dibismuth iron(III) copper(II) trihydro oxo diarsenate)
16. Medvedevite (IMA2021-082)
17. Meerschautite (IMA2013-061) 2.0 [no] [no]
18. Megacyclite (IMA1991-015) 9.CP.10
19. Megakalsilite (feldspathoid, nepheline: IMA2001-008) 9.FA.05 [no]
  (IUPAC: potassium aluminium tetraoxosilicate)
20. Megawite (perovskite, perovskite: IMA2009-090) 4.CC.30 [no]
  (IUPAC: calcium tin trioxide)
21. Meieranite (nordite: IMA2015-009) 9.0 [no] [no]
22. Meierite (zeolitic tectosilicate: IMA2014-039) 9.G [no] [no]
23. Meifuite (IMA2019-101) 9.E [no] [no]
24. Meionite (scapolite: 1801) 9.FB.15
25. Meisserite (IMA2013-039) 7.0 [no]
  (IUPAC: pentasodium uranyl trisulfate hydrogen sulfate (H_{2}O))
26. Meitnerite (johannite: IMA2017-065) 7.0 [no] [no]
27. Meixnerite (hydrotalcite: IMA1974-003) 4.FL.05
  (IUPAC: hexamagnesium dialuminium octadecahydroxide tetrahydrate)
28. Mejillonesite (IMA2010-068) 8.D0. [no] [no]
  (IUPAC: sodium dimagnesium tetrahydro hydroxophosphate phosphate monohydrate)
29. Melanarsite (IMA2014-048) 8.0 [no] [no]
  (IUPAC: tripotassium heptacopper iron(III) tetraoxo tetrarsenate)
30. Melanocerite-(Ce)^{Q} (apatite: 1887, 1890) 9.AJ.20
  (Note: might be tritomite-(Ce))
31. Melanophlogite (IMA1962 s.p. Rd) 4.DA.25
32. Melanostibite (corundum: IMA1971 s.p., 1893) 4.CB.05
33. Melanotekite (Y: 1880) 9.BE.80
  (IUPAC: dilead diiron(III) dioxo heptaoxodisilicate)
34. Melanothallite (Y: 1870) 3.DA.05
  (IUPAC: dicopper oxo dichloride)
35. Melanovanadite (Y: 1921) 4.HE.05
  (IUPAC: calcium divanadium(IV) divanadium(V) decaoxide pentahydrate)
36. Melansonite (rhodesite: IMA2018-168) 9.E [no] [no]
37. Melanterite (melanterite: 1557) 7.CB.35
  (IUPAC: iron(II) sulfate heptahydrate)
38. Melcherite (polyoxometalate: IMA2015-018) 4.0 [no] [no]
39. (Melilite sorosilicate group (Y: 1796) 09.BB.10)
  (Definition: tetragonal crystal system sorosilicates, with (XSiO_{7})^{−6}, where X is Si, Al or B)
40. Meliphanite (Y: 1852) 9.DP.05
41. Melkovite (betpakdalite: IMA1968-033) 8.DM.15
42. Melliniite (phosphide: IMA2005-027) 1.BD.20 [no]
  (IUPAC: tetra(nickel,iron) phosphide)
43. Mellite (Y: 1793) 10.AC.05
  (IUPAC: aluminium benzene hexacarboxylate hexadecahydrate)
44. Mellizinkalite (IMA2014-010) 3.0 [no] [no]
  (IUPAC: tripotassium dizinc heptachloride)
45. Melonite (Y: 1868) 2.EA.20
  (IUPAC: nickel ditelluride)
46. Mélonjosephite (IMA1973-012) 8.BG.10
  (IUPAC: calcium iron(II) iron(III) hydro diphosphate)
47. Menchettiite (lillianite: IMA2011-009) 2.0 [no]
  (Pb_{5}Mn_{3}Ag_{2}Sb_{6}As_{4}S_{24})
48. Mendeleevite 9.??.
  1. Mendeleevite-(Ce) (IMA2009-092) 9. [no]
  2. Mendeleevite-(Nd) (IMA2015-031) 9. [no]
49. Mendigite (wollastonite: IMA2014-007) 9. [no] [no]
50. Mendipite (Y: 1824) 3.DC.70
  (IUPAC: trilead dioxo dichloride)
51. Mendozavilite (betpakdalite) 7.GB.
  1. Mendozavilite-KCa (IMA2011-088) 7.GB. [no] [no]
  2. Mendozavilite-NaCu (IMA2011-039) 7.GB. [no] [no]
  3. Mendozavilite-NaFe (IMA2010-E, IMA1982-009) 7.GB.45
52. Mendozite (Y: 1868) 7.CC.15
  (IUPAC: sodium aluminium disulfate undecahydrate)
53. Meneghinite (meneghinite: 1852) 2.HB.05b
  (Pb_{13}CuSb_{7}S_{24})
54. Menezesite (polyoxometalate: IMA2005-023) 4.FN.05 [no]
55. Mengeite (IMA2018-035) 8.0 [no] [no]
56. Mengxianminite (IMA2015-070) 4.0 [no] [no]
57. Meniaylovite (IMA2002-050) 3.CG.10 [no]
  (IUPAC: tetracalcium fluoro[sulfate hexafluorosilicate (hexafluoroaluminate)] dodecahydrate)
58. Menshikovite (IMA1993-057) 2.AC.20c
  (IUPAC: tripalladium dinickel triarsenide)
59. Menzerite-(Y) (garnet, garnet: IMA2009-050) 9.AD. [no]
  (IUPAC: diyttrium calcium dimagnesium tri(tetraoxysilicate))
60. Mercallite (Y: 1935) 7.AD.10
  (IUPAC: potassium hydroxosulfate)
61. Mercury (liquid as mineraloid)
62. Mereheadite (IMA1996-045) 3.DC.45
63. Mereiterite (IMA1993-045) 7.CC.55
  (IUPAC: dipotassium iron(II) disulfate tetrahydrate)
64. Merelaniite (cylindrite: IMA2016-042) 2.0 [no] [no]
65. Merenskyite (melonite: IMA1965-016) 2.EA.20
  (IUPAC: palladium ditelluride)
66. Meridianiite (IMA2007-011) 7.CB.90 [no]
  (IUPAC: magnesium sulfate undecahydrate)
67. Merlinoite (zeolitic tectosilicate: IMA1976-046) 9.GC.15
68. Merrihueite (milarite: IMA1965-020) 9.CM.05
69. Merrillite (whitlockite: IMA1976-K, 1917 Rd) 8.AC.45 [no]
  (IUPAC: nonacalcium sodium magnesium heptaphosphate)
70. Mertieite 2.AC.1?
  1. Mertieite-I (IMA1971-016 Rd) 2.AC.15b
  2. Mertieite-II (stillwaterite: 1973) 2.AC.10b
71. Merwinite (Y: 1921) 9.AD.15
  (IUPAC: tricalcium magnesium di(tetraoxysilicate))
72. Mesaite (IMA2015-069) 4.0 [no] [no]
73. Mesolite (zeolitic tectosilicate: IMA1997 s.p., 1813) 9.GA.05
74. Messelite (fairfieldite: 1890) 8.CG.05
  (IUPAC: dicalcium iron(II) diphosphate dihydrate)
75. Meta-aluminite (aluminite: IMA1967-013) 7.DC.05
  (IUPAC: dialuminium tetrahydro sulfate pentahydrate)
76. Meta-alunogen^{Q} (Y: 1942) 7.CB.45 [no]
77. Meta-ankoleite (natroautunite: IMA1963-013) 8.EB.15
  (IUPAC: potassium uranyl phosphate trihydrate)
78. Meta-autunite (meta-autunite: 1904) 8.EB.10
  (IUPAC: calcium diuranyl diphosphate hexahydrate)
79. Metaborite (IMA1967 s.p., 1964) 6.GD.10
80. Metacalciouranoite (wolsendorfite: IMA1971-054) 4.GB.20
81. Metacinnabar (sphalerite: 1870) 2.CB.05a
  (IUPAC: mercury sulfide)
82. Metadelrioite (IMA1967-006) 4.HG.40
  (IUPAC: strontium calcium dihydro divanadate)
83. Metahaiweeite (IMA1962 s.p., 1959) 9.AK.25 [no]
84. Metaheinrichite (8.EB.: 1958) 8.EB.10
  (IUPAC: barium diuranyl diarsenate octahydrate)
85. Metahewettite (hewettite: 1914) 4.HE.15
  (IUPAC: calcium hexavanadium(V) hexadecaoxide trihydrate)
86. Metahohmannite (amarantite: 1938) 7.DB.30
  (IUPAC: diiron(III) oxo disulfate tetrahydrate)
87. Metakahlerite (8.EB.: 1958) 8.EB.10
  (IUPAC: iron(II) diuranyl diarsenate octahydrate)
88. Metakirchheimerite (8.EB.: 1958) 8.EB.10
  (IUPAC: cobalt diuranyl diarsenate octahydrate)
89. Metaköttigite (symplesite: IMA1979-077) 8.CE.85
90. Metalodèvite (IMA1972-014) 8.ED.10
  (IUPAC: zinc diuranyl diarsenate decahydrate)
91. Metamunirite (IMA1990-044) 4.HD.20
  (IUPAC: sodium vanadate(V))
92. Metanatroautunite (IMA1987-C, 1957) 8.0
  (IUPAC: sodium uranyl phosphate trihydrate)
93. Metanováčekite (8.EB.: IMA2007 s.p., 1964) 8.EB.10
  (IUPAC: magnesium diuranyl diarsenate octahydrate)
94. Metarauchite (autunite: IMA2008-050) 8.EB.05
  (IUPAC: nickel diuranyl diarsenate octahydrate)
95. Metarossite (Y: 1927) 4.HD.10
  (IUPAC: calcium divanadium(V) hexaoxide dihydrate)
96. Metasaléeite (8.EB.: 1950) 8.EB.10 [no] [no]
  (IUPAC: magnesium diuranyl diphosphate octahydrate)
97. Metaschoderite (IMA1962 s.p.) 8.CE.70
  (IUPAC: aluminium phosphate trihydrate)
98. Metaschoepite (Y: 1960) 4.GA.05
  (IUPAC: octauranyl dioxo dodecahydroxide decahydrate)
99. Metasideronatrite (Y: 1938) 7.DF.20
  (IUPAC: tetrasodium diiron dihydro tetrasulfate dihydrate)
100. Metastibnite (stibnite: 1888) 2.DB.05
  (IUPAC: diantimony trisulfide)
101. Metastudtite (IMA1981-055) 4.GA.15
  (IUPAC: uranyl dioxide dihydrate)
102. Metaswitzerite (IMA1981-027a, 1967 Rd) 8.CE.25
  (IUPAC: trimanganese(II) diphosphate tetrahydrate)
103. Metatamboite (tellurite: IMA2016-060) 4.0 [no] [no]
104. Metathénardite (IMA2015-102) 7.AC.30 [no] [no]
  (IUPAC: disodium sulfate)
105. Metatorbernite (8.EB.: 1916) 8.EB.10
  (IUPAC: copper diuranyl diphosphate octahydrate)
106. Metatyuyamunite (fritzscheite: 1954) 4.HB.25
  (IUPAC: calcium diuranyl divanadate trihydrate)
107. Metauramphite^{Q} (8.EB.: 1957) 8.EB. [no] [no]
108. Metauranocircite I (8.EB.: IMA2007 s.p., 1904) 8.EB.10
  (IUPAC: barium diuranyl diphosphate octahydrate)
109. Metauranopilite (IMA2007 s.p., 1951) 7.EA.05
  (IUPAC: hexauranyl decahydro sulfate pentahydrate)
110. Metauranospinite (8.EB.: IMA2007 s.p., 1958) 8.EB.10
  (IUPAC: calcium diuranyl diarsenate octahydrate)
111. Metauroxite (hydrous uranyl oxalate: IMA2019-030) 10.0 [no] [no]
112. Metavandendriesscheite (Y: 1960) 4.GB.40
113. Metavanmeersscheite (IMA1981-010) 8.EC.20
  (IUPAC: uranium(VI) triuranyl hexahydro diphosphate dihydrate)
114. Metavanuralite (IMA1970-003) 4.HB.20
  (IUPAC: aluminium diuranyl hydro divanadate octahydrate)
115. Metavariscite (phosphosiderite: IMA1967 s.p., 1925) 8.CD.05
  (IUPAC: aluminium phosphate dihydrate)
116. Metavauxite (Y: 1927) 8.DC.25
  (IUPAC: iron(II) dialuminium dihydro diphosphate octahydrate)
117. Metavivianite (symplesite: IMA1973-049) 8.DC.25
  (IUPAC: iron(II) diiron(III) dihydro diphosphate hexahydrate)
118. Metavoltine (metavoltine: 1883) 7.DF.35
119. Metazellerite (IMA1965-032) 5.EC.10
  (IUPAC: copper uranyl dicarbonate trihydrate)
120. Metazeunerite (8.EB.: 1937) 8.EB.10
  (IUPAC: copper diuranyl diarsenate octahydrate)
121. Meurigite (phosphofibrite) 8.DJ.20
  1. Meurigite-K (IMA1995-022) 8.DJ.20
  2. Meurigite-Na (IMA2007-024) 8.DJ.20 [no]
122. Meyerhofferite (Y: 1914) 6.CA.30
  (IUPAC: calcium pentahydro trioxo triborate hydrate)
123. Meymacite (IMA1965-001a Rd) 4.FJ.05
  (IUPAC: tungsten trioxide dihydrate)
124. Meyrowitzite (IMA2018-039) 5.0 [no] [no]
  (IUPAC: calcium uranyl dicarbonate pentahydrate)

=== Mg – Mu ===
1. Mgriite (IMA1980-100) 2.LA.45
2. Mianningite (crichtonite: IMA2014-072) 4.0 [no] [no]
3. Miargyrite (Y: 1829) 2.HA.10
  (IUPAC: silver antimonide disulfide)
4. Miassite (IMA1997-029) 2.BC.05 [no]
  (IUPAC: heptadecarhodium pentadecasulfide)
5. Michalskiite (IMA2019-062) 8.0 [no] [no]
6. Micheelsenite (ettringite: IMA1999-033) 8.DO.30
7. Michenerite (ullmannite: IMA1971-006a Rd) 2.EB.25
  (IUPAC: palladium bismuthide telluride)
8. Microcline (feldspar: 1830) 9.FA.30
9. (microlite group (tantalum dominant), pyrochlore supergroup )
10. Microsommite (cancrinite: 1872) 9.FB.05
11. Middendorfite (IMA2005-028) 9.EJ.10
12. Middlebackite (IMA2015-115) 10.0 [no] [no]
13. Mieite-(Y) (IMA2014-020) 9.AG.25 [no]
14. Miersite (sphalerite: 1898) 3.AA.05
15. Miessiite (isomertieite: IMA2006-013) 2.AC.15a [no]
  (IUPAC: undecapalladium ditelluride disulfide)
16. Miguelromeroite (hureaulite: IMA2008-066) 8.CB.10 [no] [no]
  (IUPAC: pentamanganese diarsenate dihydroxoarsenate tetrahydrate)
17. Miharaite (IMA1976-012) 2.LB.05
  (IUPAC: lead tetracopper iron bismuthide hexasulfide)
18. Mikasaite (millosevichite: IMA1992-015) 7.AB.05
  (IUPAC: diiron(III) trisulfate)
19. Mikecoxite (IMA2021-060) [no] [no]
20. Mikehowardite (IMA2020-068) 4.0 [no] [no]
21. Milanriederite (vesuvianite: IMA2018-041) 9.B [no] [no]
22. Milarite (milarite: 1870) 9.CM.05
23. Milkovoite (IMA2021-005) [no] [no]
  (IUPAC: tetracopper oxophosphate arsenate)
24. Millerite (millerite: 1845) 2.CC.20
  (IUPAC: nickel sulfide)
25. Millisite (wardite: 1930) 8.DL.10
  (IUPAC: sodium calcium hexaluminium nonahydro tetraphosphate trihydrate)
26. Millosevichite (millosevichite: 1913) 7.AB.05
  (IUPAC: dialuminium trisulfate)
27. Millsite (IMA2015-086) 4.0 [no] [no]
  (IUPAC: copper tellurite dihydrate)
28. Milotaite (ullmannite: IMA2003-056) 2.EB.25
  (IUPAC: lead antimony selenide)
29. Mimetite (apatite: 1832) 8.BN.05
  (IUPAC: pentalead chloro triarsenate)
30. Minakawaite (modderite: IMA2019-024) 2.0 [no] [no]
  (IUPAC: rhodium antimonide)
31. Minasgeraisite-(Y) (gadolinite: IMA1983-090) 9.AJ.20
32. Minasragrite (minasragrite: 1915) 7.DB.20
  (IUPAC: vanadium(IV) oxo sulfate pentahydrate)
33. Mineevite-(Y) (IMA1991-048) 5.BF.25
34. Minehillite (gyrolite: IMA1983-001) 9.EE.75
35. Minguzzite (oxalate: 1955) 10.AB.25
  (IUPAC: tripotassium iron(III) trioxalate trihydrate)
36. Minium (Y: 1806) 4.BD.05
  (IUPAC: dilead(II) lead(IV) tetraoxide)
37. Minjiangite (dmisteinbergite: IMA2013-021) 8.0 [no] [no]
  (Ba[Be_{2}P_{2}O_{8}])
38. Minnesotaite (talc: 1944) 9.EC.05
39. Minohlite (IMA2012-035) 7.0 [no] [no]
40. Minrecordite (dolomite: IMA1980-096) 5.AB.10
  (IUPAC: calcium zinc dicarbonate)
41. Minyulite (Y: 1932) 8.DH.05
  (IUPAC: potassium dialuminium fluoro diphosphate tetrahydrate)
42. Mirabilite (Y: 1845) 7.CD.10
  (IUPAC: sodium sulfate decahydrate)
43. Mirnyite (crichtonite: IMA2018-144a) [no] [no]
44. Misakiite (atacamite: IMA2013-131) 4.0 [no] [no]
  (IUPAC: tricopper manganese hexahydroxide dichloride)
45. Misenite (Y: 1849) 7.AD.15
  (IUPAC: octapotassium sulfate hexahydroxosulfate)
46. Miserite (Y: 1950) 9.DG.85
47. Mitridatite (arseniosiderite: 1914) 8.DH.30
  (IUPAC: dicalcium triiron(III) dioxo triphosphate trihydrate)
48. Mitrofanovite (IMA2017-112) 2.0 [no] [no]
49. Mitryaevaite (IMA1991-035) 8.DB.25
50. Mitscherlichite (Y: 1925) 3.CJ.15
  (IUPAC: dipotassium copper tetrachloride dihydrate)
51. Mixite (mixite: 1880) 8.DL.15
  (IUPAC: hexacopper(II) bismuth hexahydro triarsenate trihydrate)
52. Miyahisaite (apatite: IMA2011-043) 8.BN.05 [no]
53. Moabite (IMA2020-092) [no] [no]
54. Moctezumite (uranyl tellurite: IMA1965-004) 4.JK.65
  (IUPAC: lead uranyl ditellurite(IV))
55. Modderite (modderite: 1923) 2.CC.15
  (IUPAC: cobalt arsenide)
56. Moëloite (IMA1998-045) 2.HC.25 [no]
  (IUPAC: hexalead hexaantimonide heptadecasulfide)
57. Mogánite (IMA1999-035) 4.DA.20 [no]
  (IUPAC: silicon oxide (n)hydrate)
58. Mogovidite (eudialyte: IMA2004-040) 9.CO.10
59. Mohite (IMA1981-015) 2.CB.15b
  (IUPAC: dicopper trisulfa stannide)
60. Möhnite (aphthitalite: IMA2014-101) 7.0 [no] [no]
  (IUPAC: ammonium dipotassium sodium disulfate)
61. Mohrite (picromerite: IMA1964-023) 7.CC.60
  (IUPAC: diammonium iron(II) sulfate hexahydrate)
62. Moissanite (carbide: 1905) 1.DA.
  (IUPAC: silicon carbide, 'carborundum')
63. Mojaveite (tellurium oxysalt: IMA2013-120) 7.A?. [no] [no]
  (Cu_{6}[Te^{6+}O_{4}(OH)_{2}](OH)_{7}Cl)
64. Molinelloite (IMA2016-055) 8.0 [no] [no]
65. Moluranite (Y: 1957) 7.HA.15
  (IUPAC: tetrahydrogen uranium(IV) triuranyl heptamolybdate octadecahydrate)
66. Molybdenite (molybdenite: 1796) 2.EA.30
  (IUPAC: molybdenum sulfide)
67. Molybdite (IMA1963 s.p., 1907 Rd) 4.E
  (IUPAC: molybdenum trioxide)
68. Molybdofornacite (fornacite: IMA1982-062) 7.FC.10
  (IUPAC: copper dilead hydro molybdate arsenate)
69. Molybdomenite (IMA2007 s.p., 1882) 4.JF.05
  (IUPAC: lead selenite)
70. Molybdophyllite (molybdophyllite: 1901) 9.HH.25
71. Molysite (Y: 1868) 3.AC.10
  (IUPAC: iron(III) trichloride)
72. Momoiite (garnet, garnet: IMA2009-026) 9.AD.25 [no]
73. Monazite 8.AD.50
  (IUPAC: REE phosphate)
  1. Monazite-(Ce) (IMA1987 s.p., 1829) 8.AD.50
  2. Monazite-(La) (IMA1966 s.p.) 8.AD.50
  3. Monazite-(Nd) (IMA1986-052) 8.AD.50
  4. Monazite-(Sm) (IMA2001-001) 8.AD.50 [no]
74. Moncheite (melonite: IMA1967 s.p., 1963) 2.EA.20
75. Monchetundraite (IMA2019-020) 2.0 [no] [no]
  (IUPAC: dipalladium nickel ditelluride)
76. Monetite (Y: 1882) 8.AD.10
  (IUPAC: calcium hydroxophosphate)
77. Mongolite (IMA1983-027) 9.HF.05
78. Monimolite^{Q} (pyrochlore: IMA2013 s.p., 1865) 4.DH.20
  Note: possibly oxyplumboroméite (Hålenius & Bosi, 2013).
79. Monipite (barringerite: IMA2007-033) 1.BD.10
  (IUPAC: molybdenum nickel phosphide)
80. Monohydrocalcite (Y: 1964) 5.CB.20
  (IUPAC: calcium carbonate monohydrate)
81. Montanite^{Q} (tellurium oxysalt: 1868) 7.CD.60
  (IUPAC: dibismuth(III) tellurium(VI) hexaoxide dihydrate)
82. Montbrayite (IMA2017-F, 1946) 2.DB.20
  ((Au,Ag,Sb,Bi,Pb)_{23}(Te,Sb,Bi,Pb)_{38})
83. Montdorite (mica: IMA1998 s.p., 1979 Rd) 9.EC.15 [no]
84. Montebrasite (titanite, amblygonite: 1872) 8.BB.05
  (IUPAC: lithium aluminium hydro phosphate)
85. Monteneveite (garnet: IMA2018-060) 4.0 [no] [no]
86. Monteponite (rocksalt, periclase: 1901) 4.AB.25
  (IUPAC: cadmium(II) oxide)
87. Monteregianite-(Y) (rhodesite: IMA1972-026) 9.EB.15
88. Montesommaite (zeolitic tectosilicate: IMA1988-038) 9.GB.30
89. Montetrisaite (IMA2007-009) 7.DD.85
  (IUPAC: hexacopper decahydro sulfate dihydrate)
90. Montgomeryite (calcioferrite: 1940) 8.DH.25
  (IUPAC: tetracalcium magnesium tetraluminium tetrahydro hexaphosphate dodecahydrate)
91. Monticellite (olivine: 1831) 9.AC.10
  (IUPAC: calcium magnesium (tetraoxy silicate))
92. Montmorillonite (montmorillonite, smectite: 1847) 9.EC.40
93. Montroseite ("O(OH)" group: 1953) 4.FD.10
  ((V^{3+},Fe^{2+},V^{4+})O(OH))
94. Montroyalite (IMA1985-001) 5.DB.10
  (IUPAC: tetrastrontium octaaluminium tricarbonate hexacosahydroxide decahydrate)
95. Montroydite (Y: 1903) 4.AC.15
  (IUPAC: mercury oxide)
96. Mooihoekite (chalcopyrite: IMA1971-019) 2.CB.10b
  (IUPAC: nonacopper nonairon hexadecasulfide)
97. Moolooite (oxalate: IMA1980-082) 10.AB.15
98. Mooreite (Y: 1929) 7.DD.45
  (IUPAC: pentadecamagnesium hexacosahydro disulfate octahydrate)
99. Moorhouseite (hexahydrite: IMA1963-008) 7.CB.25
  (IUPAC: cobalt sulfate hexahydrate)
100. Mopungite (perovskite, stottite: IMA1982-020) 4.FC.15
  (IUPAC: sodium antimony(V) hexahydroxide)
101. Moraesite (Y: 1953) 8.DA.05
  (IUPAC: diberyllium hydro phosphate tetrahydrate)
102. Moraskoite (moraskoite: IMA2013-084) 8.0 [no] [no]
  (IUPAC: disodium magnesium fluoro phosphate)
103. Mordenite (zeolitic tectosilicate: IMA1997 s.p., 1864) 9.GD.35
104. Moreauite (IMA1984-010) 8.ED.05
  (IUPAC: trialuminium uranyl dihydro triphosphate tridecahydrate)
105. Morelandite (apatite: IMA1977-035) 8.BN.05
  (IUPAC: dicalcium tribarium chloro triarsenate)
106. Morenosite (epsomite: 1851) 7.CB.40
  (IUPAC: nickel sulfate heptahydrate)
107. Morimotoite (garnet, garnet: IMA1992-017) 9.AD.25 [no]
108. Morinite (IMA1967 s.p., 1891) 8.DM.05
  (IUPAC: sodium dicalcium dialuminium hydroxo tetrafluoro diphosphate dihydrate)
109. Morozeviczite (IMA1974-036) 2.CB.35a
110. Morrisonite (polyoxometalate: IMA2014-088) 4.0 [no] [no]
111. Mosandrite-(Ce) (seidozerite, rinkite: IMA2016-A, IMA2009-C, IMA2007 s.p., 1842 Rd) 9.BE.20 [no]
112. Moschelite (IMA1987-038) 3.AA.30
  (IUPAC: dimercury diiodide)
113. Moschellandsbergite (amalgam: 1938) 1.AD.15d
  (IUPAC: disilver trimercury amalgam)
114. Mosesite (Y: 1910) 3.DD.30
115. Moskvinite-(Y) (IMA2002-031) 9.CD.05
  (IUPAC: disodium potassium yttrium pentadecaoxy hexasilicate)
116. Mössbauerite (hydrotalcite: IMA2012-049) 4.0 [no] [no]
  (IUPAC: hexairon(III) tetraoxo octahydroxide carbonate trihydrate)
117. Mottanaite-(Ce) (hellandite: IMA2018-D, IMA2001-020) 9.DK.20 [no]
118. Mottramite (decloizite: 1876) 8.BH.40
  (IUPAC: lead copper hydro vanadate)
119. Motukoreaite^{Q} (hydrotalcite, woodwardite: IMA1976-033) 7.DD.35
120. Mounanaite (tsumcorite: IMA1968-031) 8.CG.15
  (IUPAC: lead diiron(III) dihydro divanadate)
121. Mountainite (Y: 1957) 9.GG.10
122. Mountkeithite (hydrotalcite, woodwardite: IMA1980-038) 7.DD.35
123. Mourite (IMA1967 s.p., 1962) 4.FL.80
  (IUPAC: uranyl pentamolybdenum(VI) hexadecaoxide pentahydrate)
124. Moxuanxueite (woehlerite: IMA2019-100) 9.BE. [no] [no]
125. Moydite-(Y) (IMA1985-025) 6.AC.45
  (IUPAC: yttrium tetrahydro borate carbonate)
126. Mozartite (adelite: IMA1991-016) 9.AG.60
  (IUPAC: calcium manganese(III) tetraoxysilicate hydroxyl)
127. Mozgovaite (IMA1998-060) 2.JA.05h
128. Mpororoite (anthoinite: IMA1970-037) 7.GB.35
  (IUPAC: dialuminium oxo ditungstate hexahydrate)
129. Mrázekite (IMA1990-045) 8.DJ.40
130. Mroseite (IMA1974-032) 4.JL.15
  (IUPAC: calcium tellurium(IV) dioxocarbonate)
131. Mückeite (IMA1988-018) 2.GA.25
  (IUPAC: copper nickel bismuth trisulfide)
132. Muirite (IMA1964-013) 9.CN.05
133. Mukhinite (epidote, clinozoisite: IMA1968-035) 9.BG.05a
134. Müllerite (tellurium oxysalt: IMA2019-060) 8.0 [no] [no]
135. Mullite (Y: 1924) 9.AF.20
136. Mummeite (pavonite: IMA1986-025) 2.JA.05f
137. Munakataite (linarite: IMA2007-012) 7.BC.65
  (IUPAC: dilead dicopper tetrahydro selenite sulfate)
138. Mundite (IMA1980-075) 8.EC.30
  (IUPAC: aluminium triuranyl trihydro diphosphate (5.5)hydrate)
139. Mundrabillaite (IMA1978-058) 8.CJ.10
  (IUPAC: diammonium calcium dihydroxophosphate monohydrate)
140. Munirite (IMA1982-038) 4.HD.15
  (IUPAC: sodium vanadium(V) trioxide (1.9)hydrate)
141. Murakamiite (pectolite: IMA2016-066) 9.D?. [no] [no]
142. Murashkoite (phosphide: IMA2012-071) 1.0 [no] [no]
  (IUPAC: iron phosphide)
143. Murataite-(Y) (IMA1972-007) 4.DF.15
144. Murchisite (IMA2010-003) 2.0 [no] [no]
  (IUPAC: pentachromium hexasulfide)
145. Murdochite (murdochite: 1955) 3.DB.45
  (IUPAC: dodecacopper dilead pentadecaoxo dichloride)
146. Murmanite (seidozerite, murmanite: 1930) 9.BE.27
  (IUPAC: disodium dititanium (heptaoxy disilicate) dioxy dihydrate)
147. Murphyite (raspite: IMA2021-107) 7.AD. [no] [no]
148. Murunskite (IMA1980-064) 2.BD.30
149. Muscovite (mica: IMA1998 s.p., 1794) 9.EC.15
  (IUPAC: potassium dialuminium (aluminotrisilicate) decaoxydihydroxyl)
150. Museumite (IMA2003-039) 2.HB.20c
151. Mushistonite (perovskite, schoenfliesite: IMA1982-068) 4.FC.10
  (IUPAC: copper(II) tin(IV) hexahydroxide)
152. Muskoxite^{Q} (hydrotalcite: IMA1967-043) 4.FL.05
  (IUPAC: heptamagnesium tetrairon(III) hexacosahydroxide monohydrate)
153. Muthmannite (Y: 1911) 2.CB.85
  (IUPAC: gold silver ditelluride)
154. Mutinaite (zeolitic tectosilicate: IMA1996-025) 9.GF.35 [no]
155. Mutnovskite (IMA2004-032) 2.GC.50 [no]
  (IUPAC: dilead iodo arsenide trisulfide)
