= Agardite =

Mineral group

Agardite-(Y), agardite-(Ce), agardite-(Nd), agardite-(La)
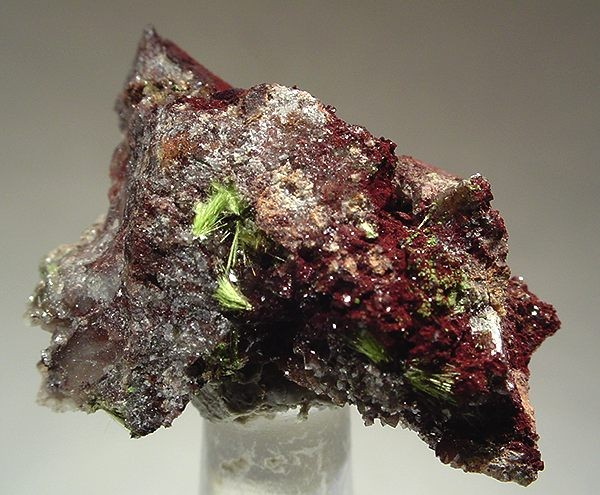
- An example of agardite-(Ce) in the form of pistachio-green acicular crystals on contrasting matrix

General
- Category: Arsenate minerals
- Formula: (REE,Ca)Cu_{6}(AsO_{4})_{3}(OH)_{6}·3H_{2}O
- IMA symbol: Arg-Y, Arg-Ce. Agr-Nd, Arg-La
- Strunz classification: 8.DL.15
- Dana classification: (Y): 42.05.01.02 (Ce): 42.05.01.02e (Nd): 42.05.01.02b (La): 42.05.01.02a
- Crystal system: Hexagonal
- Crystal class: Dipyramidal (6/m); H–M symbol: (6/m)
- Space group: P6_{3}/m (agardite-(La): unknown space group)
- Unit cell: a = 13.59, c = 5.89 [Å], Z = 2

Identification
- Color: Yellow green
- Crystal habit: Acicular
- Cleavage: None
- Fracture: Conchoidal
- Mohs scale hardness: 3–4
- Luster: Vitreous
- Streak: Greenish white
- Specific gravity: 3.7 (measured), 3.775 (calculated)
- Refractive index: n_{ω} = 1.725, n_{ε} = 1.81
- Birefringence: 0.085
- Pleochroism: Yellowish green

Agardite is a mineral group consisting of agardite-(Y), agardite-(Ce), agardite-(Nd), and agardite-(La). They comprise a group of minerals that are hydrous hydrated arsenates of rare-earth elements (REE) and copper, with the general chemical formula (REE,Ca)Cu_{6}(AsO_{4})_{3}(OH)_{6}·3H_{2}O. Yttrium, cerium, neodymium, lanthanum, as well as trace to minor amounts of other REEs, are present in their structure. Agardite-(Y) is probably the most often found representative. They form needle-like yellow-green (variably hued) crystals in the hexagonal crystal system. Agardite minerals are a member of the mixite structure group, which has the general chemical formula Cu^{2+}_{6}A(TO_{4})_{3}(OH)_{6}·3H_{2}O, where A is a REE, Al, Ca, Pb, or Bi, and T is P or As. In addition to the four agardite minerals, the other members of the mixite mineral group are calciopetersite, goudeyite, mixite, petersite-(Ce), petersite-(Y), plumboagardite, and zálesíite.

Agardite-(Y) from the Bou Skour mine in Djebel Sarhro, Morocco was the first of the agardite-group minerals to be characterized. It was described by Dietrich in 1969 and was named after Jules Agard, a French geologist at the Bureau de Recherches Géologiques et Minières, Orléans, France. Agardite-group minerals have subsequently been found in Germany, Czech Republic, Greece, Italy, Japan, Namibia, Poland, Spain, Switzerland, the United Kingdom, and the United States.

== See also ==
- List of minerals
