= Miassite =

Mineral and unconventional superconductor

General
- Category: Minerals
- Formula: Rh_{17}S_{15}
- IMA symbol: Mia
- Strunz classification: 2.BC.05
- Crystal system: cubic
- Crystal class: Pm3n
- Unit cell: a = 10.024 V=1,007.22 Å^{3}

Structure

Identification
- Colour: light grey
- Tenacity: brittle
- Mohs scale hardness: 5-6
- Luster: metallic
- Diaphaneity: Opaque
- Density: 7.42
- Solubility: insoluble

Miassite is a mineral made of rhodium and sulfur, with the stoichometric formula Rh_{17}S_{15}. It was named after the Miass River in the Urals. It is a superconductor and an unconventional superconductor. Naturally occurring miassite is too brittle, so it is made in a lab for superconductor research.

Its ability to be an unconventional superconductor was discovered at Ames National Laboratory in 2024.

Miassite, covellite, parkerite, and palladseite, occur in nature, and are also made in labs as superconductors. Miassite is the only one found to also have unconventional superconductivity.
