= Magnesiohastingsite =

Calcium-containing amphibole and member of the hornblende group

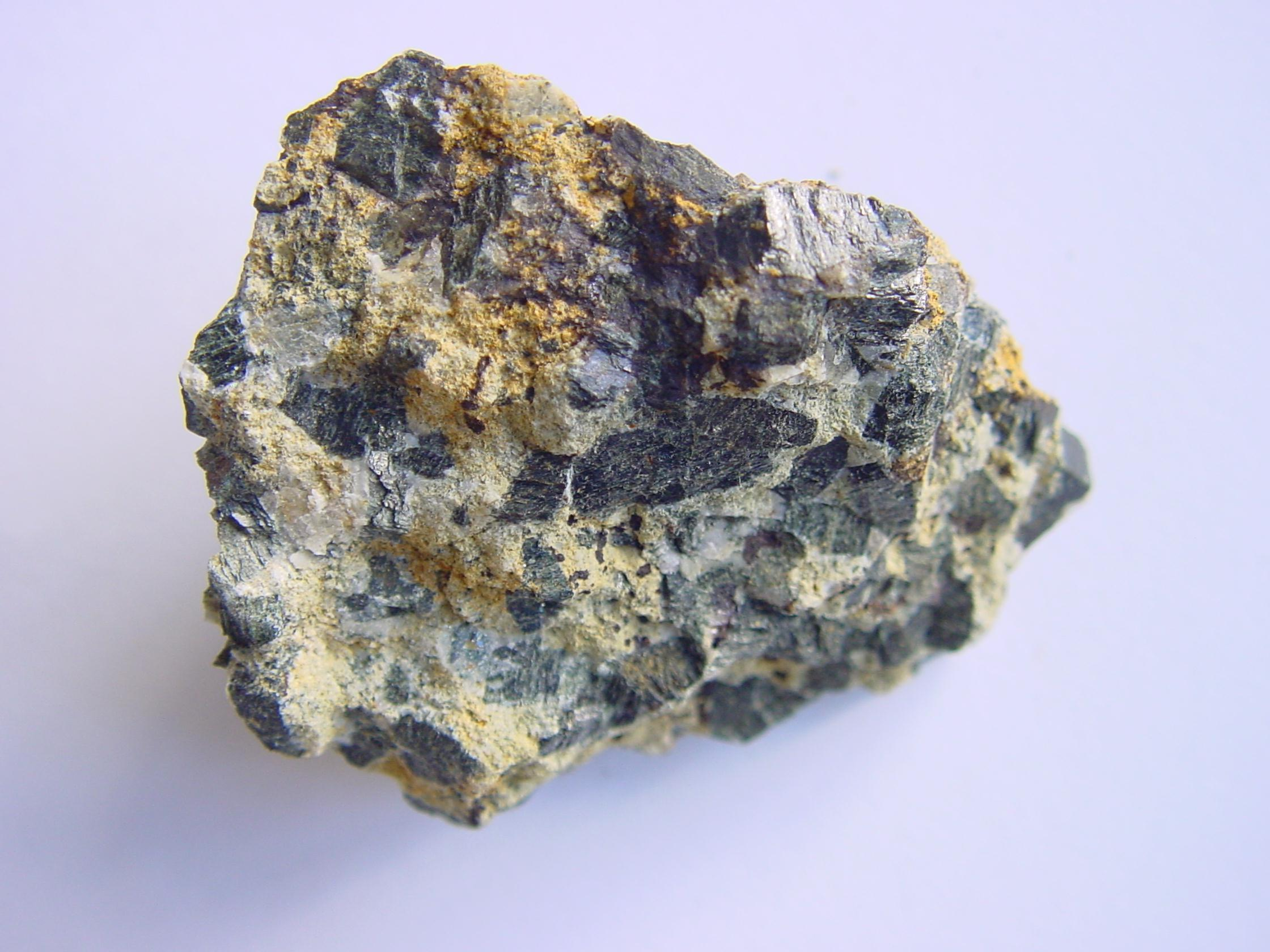
- Magnesiohastingsite from Bratislava, Slovakia. Specimen size 4.5 cm

General
- Category: Amphibole
- Formula: NaCa_{2}(Mg_{4}Fe^{3+})(Si_{6}Al_{2})O_{22}(OH)_{2}
- Strunz classification: 9.DE.15 (10 ed); 8/F.10-130 (8 ed)
- Dana classification: 66.01.03a.14
- Crystal system: Monoclinic
- Crystal class: Prismatic (2/m) (same H-M symbol)
- Space group: C2/m

Identification
- Formula mass: 864.69 g/mol
- Color: Green to dark green or black
- Twinning: Simple or multiple twinning parallel to {100}
- Cleavage: Good on {110} with intersections at about 56° and 124°. Partings on {001}, {100}
- Tenacity: Brittle
- Mohs scale hardness: 5 to 6
- Luster: Vitreous
- Streak: Pale grey-green to pale brownish-green
- Diaphaneity: Subopaque
- Specific gravity: 3.16 to 3.22
- Optical properties: Biaxial (-)
- Solubility: Insoluble in HCl
- Other characteristics: Not radioactive

Magnesiohastingsite is a calcium-containing amphibole and a member of the hornblende group. It is an inosilicate (chain silicate) with the formula NaCa_{2}(Mg_{4}Fe^{3+})(Si_{6}Al_{2})O_{22}(OH)_{2} and molar mass 864.69 g. In synthetic magnesiohastingsite it appears that iron occurs both as ferrous iron Fe^{2+} and as ferric iron Fe^{3+}, but the ideal formula features only ferric iron. It was named in 1928 by Marland P. Billings. The name is for its relationship to hastingsite and its magnesium content. Hastingsite was named for the locality in Dungannon Township, Hastings County, Ontario, Canada.

Calcic (containing calcium) amphiboles include:

- The tremolite – actinolite – ferro-actinolite series
- The hornblende group
- The kaersutite – ferro-kaersutite series
- Joesmithite

The hornblende group includes:

- The edenite – ferro-edenite series
- The tschermakite – ferrotschermakite series
- The pargasite – ferro-pargasite series
- The magnesiohastingsite – hastingsite series
- The magnesiosadanagaite – sadanagaite series

== Unit cell ==
Magnesiohastingsite belongs to the monoclinic crystal system, point group 2/m, space group C2/m. It has two formula units per unit cell (Z = 2). The unit cell parameters both for natural and for synthetic material are a = 9.9 Å, b = 18.0 Å, c = 5.3 Å, β = 105°.

== Structure ==
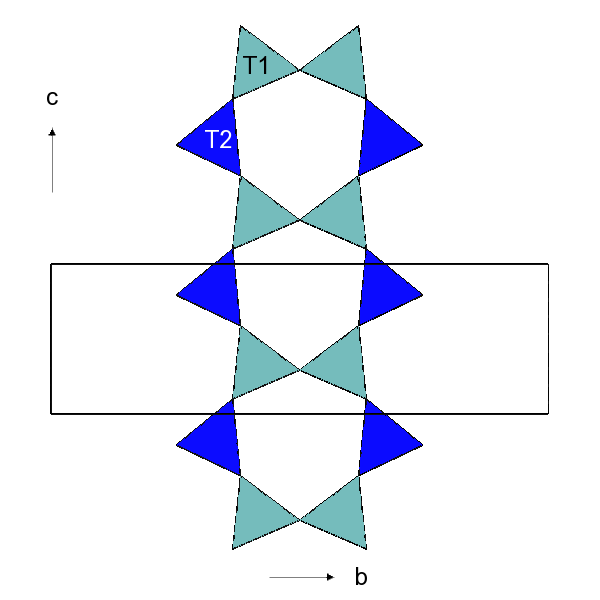
Double Chain of SiO_{4} Tetrahedra

The structure of all amphiboles is based on a double chain of linked SiO_{4} tetrahedra, with composition (Si_{4}O_{11})_{n}. The inner tetrahedra are referred to as T1 and the outer ones as T2. The pattern in the double chain repeats after a block of two T1 and two T2 tetrahedra, with a repeat distance of approximately 5.3 Å, and this determines the length of the unit cell along the c crystal axis. The tetrahedra within a chain all point outwards in the same direction, and the chains are linked back-to-back by cations to form I-beams. The I-beams themselves are then linked together to form the complete structure.

== Optical properties ==
The mineral is subopaque and vitreous, green to dark green or black in color and with a pale grey-green to pale brownish-green streak. It is biaxial (-) with refractive indices for natural material in the range n_{α} = 1.652 to 1.676, n_{β} = 1.661 to 1.695, n_{γ} = 1.666 to 1.706. Synthetic material has n_{α} = 1.642 to 1.657, n_{γ} = 1.653 to 1.672. An increase in magnesium content causes a decrease in refractive indices. The maximum birefringence (the difference in refractive index between light travelling through the crystal with different polarizations) is δ = 0.012 to 0.033. The optic angle 2V is the angle between the two optic axes in a biaxial crystal. Measured values of 2V for this mineral vary widely from about 60° to 90°. It is also possible to calculate a theoretical value of 2V from the measured values of the refractive indices. The calculated value varies from 68° to 88°. The direction perpendicular to the plane containing the two optic axes is called the optical direction Y. In magnesiohastingsite Y is parallel to the b crystal axis. The optical direction Z lies in the plane containing the two optic axes and bisects the angle between them. In magnesiohastingsite the angle between Z and the c crystal axis is 15° to 19°. If the color of the incident light is changed, then the refractive indices are modified, and the value of 2V changes. This is known as dispersion of the optic axes. For magnesiohastingsite the effect is weak, with 2V larger for red light than for violet light (r>v).

Pleochroism is variable in green, yellow-green, bluish-green and brown.

== Physical properties ==
Cleavage is good with cleavage surfaces intersecting at about 56° and 124°, as is common with all the amphiboles. The mineral displays simple or multiple twinning parallel to a prism face. It is a brittle mineral, with Mohs hardness 5 to 6 and specific gravity 3.2, with increasing magnesium content causing a decrease in specific gravity. It is not radioactive and it is insoluble in hydrochloric acid.

== Occurrence and associations ==
The type locality is in the Canadian National Railway tunnel, Montreal, Quebec, Canada. It is common in amphibolite, schist and pegmatitic gabbro. It is also found in welded tuffs, granodiorite, granite and tonalite. Associated minerals include quartz, orthoclase, plagioclase, biotite, magnetite and apatite. Barkevikite and the magnesium-rich members of the hastingsite group are found in diorite, essexite and related calcium-rich rocks. Localities include:

- The granitic batholiths of the Scottish Highlands
- The Swiss and Italian Alps
- The Harz Mountains, Germany
- Finland and Sweden
- Japan, where it is widespread
- The Southern California and Sierra Nevada batholiths, California, US
- Langban, Sweden, in skarn
- In a xenolith in diorite porphyry in the Mount Hilliers complex, Henry Mountains, Garfield County, Utah
