= Maneckiite =

Rare phosphate mineral

General
- Category: Phosphate
- Formula: (Na[])Ca_{2}Fe^{2+}_{2}(Fe^{3+}Mg)Mn_{2}(PO_{4})_{6}•2H_{2}O
- IMA symbol: Mnc
- Crystal system: Orthorhombic
- Crystal class: Dipyramidal (mmm); H-M symbol: (2/m 2/m 2/m)
- Space group: Pcab
- Unit cell: a = 12.53, b = 12.91, c = 11.66 [Å] (approximated)

Identification

Maneckiite is a rare phosphate mineral with the formula(Na[])Ca_{2}Fe^{2+}_{2}(Fe^{3+}Mg)Mn_{2}(PO_{4})_{6}•2H_{2}O. It was found in Michałkowa, Góry Sowie Block, Lower Silesia, Poland.

== Relation to other minerals ==
Maneckiite is a member of the wicksite group.
