= Manganvesuvianite =

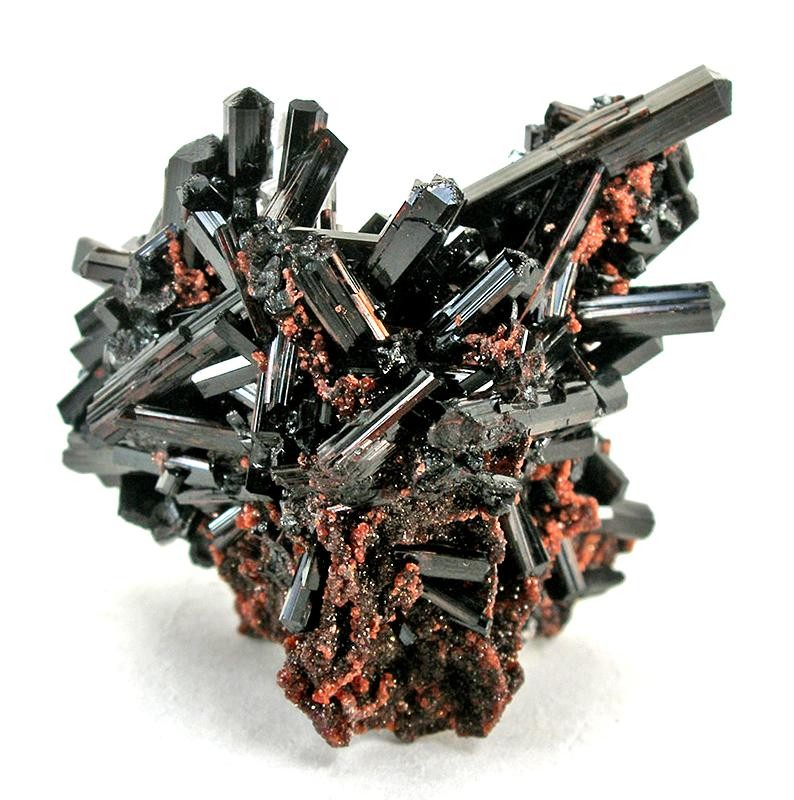
- Manganvesuvianite from Wessels Mine, Northern Cape Province, South Africa (4.2 x 3.9 x 3.3 cm)

General
- Category: Sorosilicates
- Formula: Ca_{19}Mn^{3+}(Al,Mn^{3+},Fe^{3+})_{10}(Mg,Mn^{2+})_{2}(Si_{2}O_{7})_{4}(SiO_{4})_{10}O(OH)_{9}
- IMA symbol: Mnves
- Strunz classification: 9.BG.35
- Dana classification: 58.02.04.04
- Crystal system: Tetragonal
- Crystal class: Dipyramidal (4/m) (same H-M symbol)
- Space group: P4/n
- Unit cell: a = 15.575 Å, c = 11.824 Å, Z = 2

Identification
- Color: Deep red-brown, red, nearly black
- Cleavage: None observed
- Fracture: Conchoidal
- Mohs scale hardness: 6 to 7
- Luster: Vitreous
- Streak: White
- Diaphaneity: Transparent, translucent, opaque
- Optical properties: Uniaxial (-)
- Refractive index: n_{ω} = 1.735, n_{ε} = 1.724
- Birefringence: δ = 0.012
- Pleochroism: Strong

Manganvesuvianite is a rare mineral with formula Ca_{19}Mn^{3+}(Al,Mn^{3+},Fe^{3+})_{10}(Mg,Mn^{2+})_{2}(Si_{2}O_{7})_{4}(SiO_{4})_{10}O(OH)_{9}. The mineral is red to nearly black in color. Discovered in South Africa and described in 2002, it was so named for the prevalence of manganese in its composition and its relation to vesuvianite.

== Occurrence and formation ==
Manganvesuvianite crystals occur as long prisms up to 1.5 cm (0.59 in). Small crystals are transparent and red to lilac in color; large crystals are opaque and nearly black in color with dark-red internal reflections. Strongly zoned crystals less than 0.2 mm (0.0079 in) in size constitute rock-forming manganvesuvianite.

As of 2012, manganvesuvianite has been found at two locations in South Africa. It formed at temperatures of 250 to 400 °C (482 to 752 °F) by the hydrothermal alteration of sedimentary and metamorphic manganese ores. Crystallization occurred in fault planes and lenticular bodies in the ore bed or by filling veins and vugs. Manganvesuvianite has been found in association with calcite, manganese-poor grossular, hydrogrossular-henritermierite, mozartite, serandite-pectolite, strontiopiemontite-tweddillite, and xonotlite.

Manganvesuvianite is a member of the vesuvianite group and is the manganese analogue of vesuvianite.

== History ==
In 1883, Arnold von Lasaulx made the first detailed description of vesuvianite containing up to 3.2 wt% MnO from Lower Silesia in Poland. Studies in the 1980s and 1990s revealed that the vesuvianite group was more complex than previously assumed, necessitating the definition of new minerals. In 2000, vesuvianite was found containing up to 14.3 wt% MnO from the Kalahari manganese fields of Northern Cape Province, South Africa. Manganvesuvianite proper was discovered in the Wessels (27°6′56.43″S 22°51′27.87″E) and N'Chwaning (shaft II; 27°8′6.84″S 22°51′55.99″E) mines of the Kalahari manganese fields and described in 2002 in the journal Mineralogical Magazine. It was named manganvesuvianite for the significant manganese in its formula and its relation to vesuvianite. The mineral and name were approved by the IMA Commission on New Minerals and Mineral Names (IMA 2000-40). The type specimen from the N'Chwaning II Mine is held at the Natural History Museum of Bern in Switzerland.
