= Manganiceladonite =

Rare silicate mineral

General
- Category: Phyllosilicate
- Formula: KMgMn^{3+}Si_{4}O_{10}(OH)_{2}
- IMA symbol: Mcel
- Crystal system: Monoclinic
- Crystal class: Prismatic (2/m) or sphenoidal (2)
- Space group: C2, C2/m
- Unit cell: a = 5.15, b = 8.92, c = 10.30 [Å], β = 102°

Identification

Manganiceladonite is a rare silicate mineral with the formula KMgMn^{3+}Si_{4}O_{10}(OH)_{2}. It is one of many minerals discovered in the Cerchiara mine, La Spezia, Liguria, Italy.

== Relation to other minerals ==
Manganiceladonite, as suggested by its name, is a trivalent-manganese-analogue of celadonite.
