= Mixite =

Copper bismuth arsenate mineral

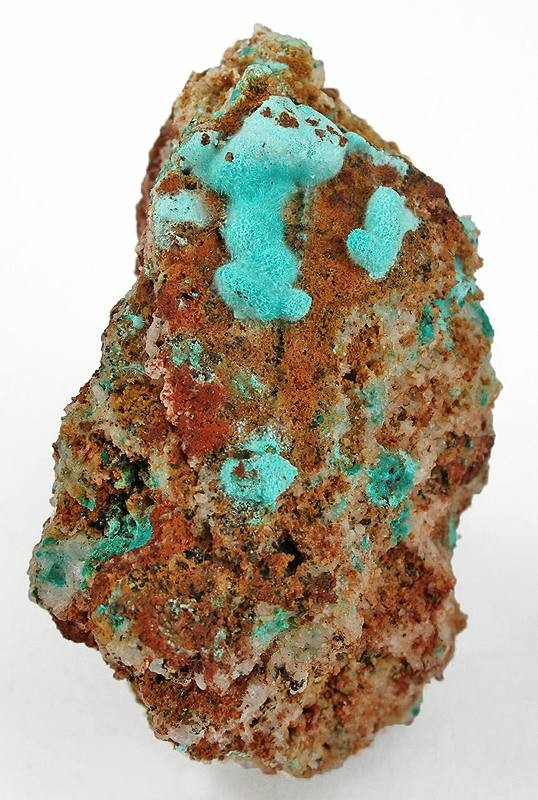
- Turquoise-blue mixite, Laurium, Greece. Size: 6.8 x 5.0 x 3.6 cm.

General
- Category: Arsenate mineral
- Formula: BiCu_{6}(AsO_{4})_{3}(OH)_{6}·3(H_{2}O)
- IMA symbol: Mix
- Strunz classification: 8.DL.15
- Crystal system: Hexagonal
- Crystal class: Dipyramidal (6/m) (same H-M symbol)
- Space group: P6_{3}/m
- Unit cell: a = 13.646(2) Å, c = 5.920(1) Å; Z = 2

Identification
- Color: Blue to emerald-green, pale green, white
- Crystal habit: Acicular crystals often in radial clusters
- Fracture: Uneven
- Mohs scale hardness: 3–4
- Luster: Vitreous
- Streak: Pale green
- Diaphaneity: Transparent to translucent
- Specific gravity: 3.79–3.83
- Optical properties: Uniaxial (+)
- Refractive index: n_{ω} = 1.743 – 1.749 n_{ε} = 1.810 – 1.830
- Birefringence: δ = 0.067
- Pleochroism: O = colorless, E = bright green

Mixite is a rare copper bismuth arsenate mineral with formula: BiCu_{6}(AsO_{4})_{3}(OH)_{6}·3(H_{2}O). It crystallizes in the hexagonal crystal system typically occurring as radiating acicular prisms and massive encrustations. The color varies from white to various shades of green and blue. It has a Mohs hardness of 3.5 to 4 and a specific gravity of 3.8. It has an uneven fracture and a brilliant to adamantine luster.

It occurs as a secondary mineral in the oxidized zones of copper deposits. Associated minerals include: bismutite, smaltite, native bismuth, atelestite, erythrite, malachite and barite.

It was discovered in 1879 near J´achymov, Czech Republic by mine engineer Anton Mixa. Mixite has also been found in Argentina, Australia, Austria, France, Germany, Greece, Hungary, Italy, Japan, Mexico, Namibia, Poland, Spain, Switzerland, the United Kingdom, and the United States.

Mixite is the namesake member of the mixite mineral group, which has the general chemical formula Cu^{2+}_{6}A(TO_{4})_{3}(OH)_{6}·3H_{2}O, where A is a REE, Al, Ca, Pb, or Bi, and T is P or As. In addition to mixite, this mineral group contains the isostructural minerals agardite-(Y), agardite-(Ce), agardite-(Nd), agardite-(La), calciopetersite, goudeyite, petersite-(Ce), petersite-(Y), plumboagardite, and zálesíite.
