= Miguelromeroite =

Pale pink mineral - synthetic compound

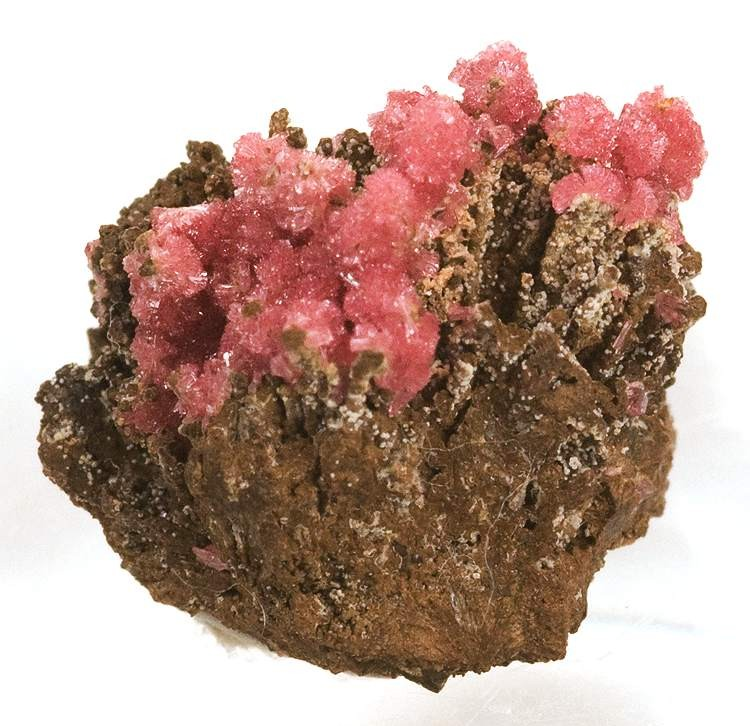

General
- Category: Minerals
- Formula: Mn_{5}(AsO_{4})_{2}(HAsO_{4})_{2} · 4H_{2}O
- IMA symbol: Mig
- Crystal system: Monoclinic
- Crystal class: Prismatic; H-M symbol: 2/m
- Space group: B2/b
- Unit cell: 1,624.38

Identification
- Color: Salmon pink to orange
- Twinning: None observed
- Cleavage: Good on {100}
- Fracture: Conchoidal
- Mohs scale hardness: 4
- Luster: Vitreous
- Streak: Pale pink
- Diaphaneity: Transparent
- Density: 3.69
- Optical properties: Biaxial (−)
- Refractive index: n_{α} = 1.713 n_{β} = 1.723 n_{γ} = 1.729
- Birefringence: 0.016
- Pleochroism: Visible
- 2V angle: Measured: 70° Calculated: 75°

Miguelromeroite is a mineral named for Miguel Romero Sanchez by Anthony Robert Kampf. The mineral, first described in 2008 was named in 2009, the same year it got approved by the International Mineralogical Association.

== Properties ==
Miguelromeroite is a member of the hureaulite group, and is the manganese analogue of the mineral sainfeldite. It is known as a synthetic compound, and was originally labeled as villyaellenite due to the very rare complex arsenate microcrystals. It shows pleochroic attributes, which is an optical phenomenon that makes gems to be seen a different color depending on the axis it is being inspected. Viewing it from the Z axis, the mineral can be seen in a pale pink color. It was redefined as an intermediate species of the series. It is the full magnesium endmember of the series. Crystals are up to 4 cms in length, and are elongated on [001] with forms {100}, {110} and {101̅}.

== Structure ==
The mineral's structure is defined by an octahedral edge-sharing pentamer. The pentamers are linked into a loose framework by sharing corners with octahedra in adjacent pentamers and they are further linked through AsO_{4} and AsO_{3}OH tetrahedra. There are three distinct octahedral sites: M1, M2, and M3. In miguelromeroite's structure, all of the octahedral sites are occupied by manganese and the average bond lengths for the sites fall within a relatively narrow range. Though the differences in the sites suggest that the sites M2 and M3 contain small amounts of zinc and calcium.

== Mines ==
The samples were from the Veta Negra mine in Chile. Other mines include Gozaisho mine in Honshu island, Japan, and Mina Ojuela in Mapimi, Durango, Mexico. It's a type locality only in these three mines.
