= Mcgillite =

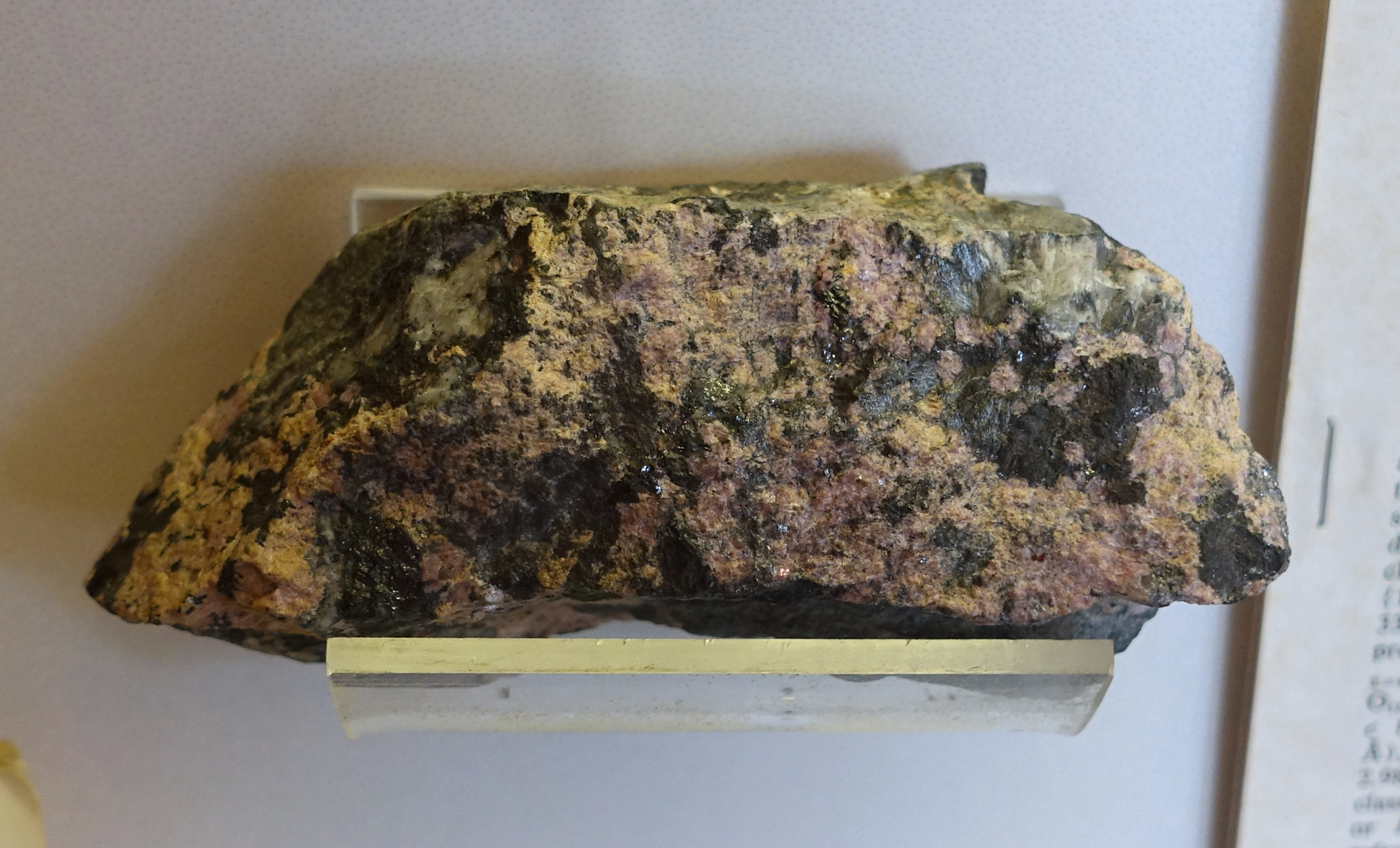
Mcgillite specimen in the Redpath Museum, McGill University.

Mcgillite is a rare, monoclinic, pseudohexagonal mineral of the Pyrosmalite group, with the formula Mn^{2+}_{8}Si_{6}O_{15}(OH)_{8}Cl_{2}. It was first approved in 1979, and is named for McGill University.

Mcgillite is found in the Sullivan Mine, Kimberley, Kootenay district, British Columbia, Canada; the Kyurazawa mine, Tochigi Prefecture, Japan; and at one location in Romania. At the Sullivan mine, it forms as fracture fillings in a manganese-rich portion of quartzite and argillite within a metamorphosed lead-zinc deposit. It is pink in color.
