= Amorphous calcium carbonate =

Non-crystalline CaCO3

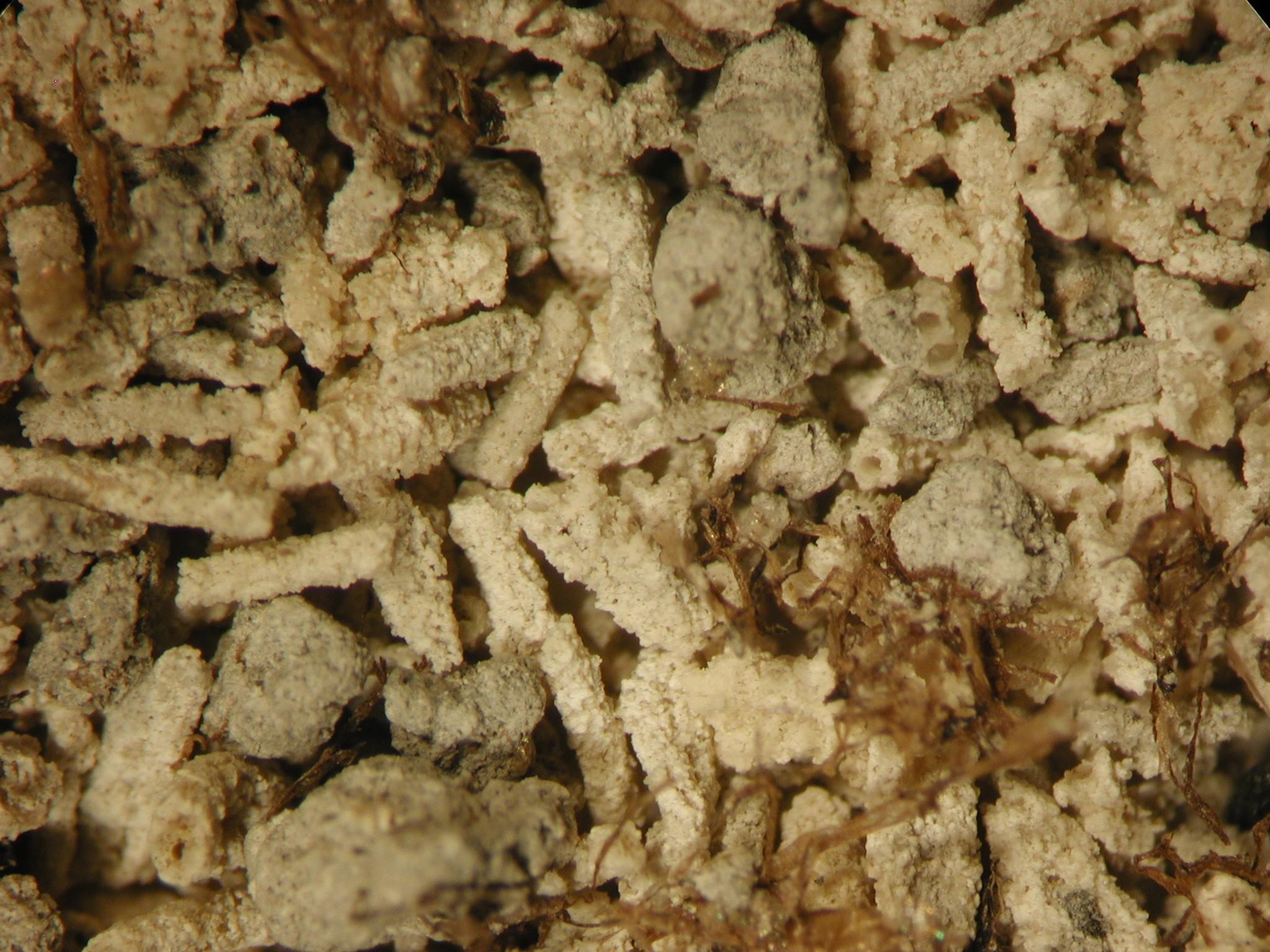
These deposits of tufa contain amorphous calcium carbonate along remains of algae and moss

Amorphous calcium carbonate (ACC) is the amorphous and least stable polymorph of calcium carbonate. ACC is extremely unstable under normal conditions and is found naturally in taxa as wide-ranging as sea urchins, corals, mollusks, and foraminifera. It is usually found as a monohydrate, holding the chemical formula CaCO_{3}·H_{2}O; however, it can also exist in a dehydrated state, CaCO_{3}. ACC has been known to science for over 100 years when a non-diffraction pattern of calcium carbonate was discovered by Herman E. Sturcke, exhibiting its poorly-ordered nature.

ACC is an example of crystallization by particle attachment (CPA), where crystals form via the addition of particles ranging from multi-ion complexes to fully formed nanocrystals. Research of such systems have diverse application; however, the current lack of unambiguous answers to fundamental questions (i.e. solubility product, interfacial forces, structure, etc.) causes them to be topics of study in fields ranging from chemistry, geology, biology, physics, and materials science engineering.

== Stability ==
ACC is the sixth and least stable polymorph of calcium carbonate. The remaining five polymorphs (in decreasing stability) are: calcite, aragonite, vaterite, monohydrocalcite and ikaite. When mixing two supersaturated solutions of calcium chloride and sodium carbonate (or sodium bicarbonates) these polymorphs will precipitate from solution following Ostwald's step rule, which states that the least stable polymorph will precipitate first. But while ACC is the first product to precipitate, it rapidly transforms into one of the more stable polymorphs within seconds. When in pure CaCO_{3}, ACC transforms within seconds into one of the crystalline calcium carbonate polymorphs. This transformation from amorphous to crystalline is proposed to be a dissolution-reprecipitation mechanism. Despite ACC's highly unstable nature, some organisms are able to produce stable ACC. For example, the American Lobster Homarus americanus, maintains stable ACC throughout its yearly molt cycle. Studies of biogenic ACC have also shown that these stable forms of ACC are hydrated whereas the transient forms are not. From observations of spicule growth in sea urchins, it seems that ACC is deposited at the location of new mineral growth where it then dehydrates and transforms into calcite. Recent solid‑state NMR studies have shown that poly‑aspartate can integrate into amorphous calcium carbonate (ACC), adopting an α‑helix conformation and significantly stabilizing the phase against crystallization; additionally, water molecules within ACC were observed to reorient via 180° flips on a millisecond timescale.

== In biology ==
Several organisms have developed methods to stabilize ACC by using specialized proteins for various purposes. The function of ACC in these species is inferred to be for the storage/transport of materials for biomineralization or enhancement of physical properties, but the validity of such inferences has yet to be determined. Earthworms, some bivalves species, and some gastropods species are known to produce very stable ACC. ACC is widely used by crustaceans to stiffen the exoskeleton as well as to store calcium in gastroliths during the molt cycle. Here, the benefit of utilizing ACC may not be for physical strength, but for its periodic need of the exoskeleton to be dissolved for molting. Sea urchins and their larvae utilize the transient form of ACC when forming spicules. The new material, a hydrated form of ACC, for the spicule is transported and deposited at the outer edges of the spicule. Then the deposited material, ACC·H_{2}O, rapidly dehydrates to ACC. Following the dehydration, within 24 hours, all of the ACC will have transformed into calcite.

== Synthetic ACC ==
Many methods, have been devised for synthetically producing ACC since its discovery at 1989, however, only few syntheses successfully stabilized ACC for more than several weeks. Contrary to earlier assumptions of rapid crystallization, recent observations confirm that poly-aspartate stabilized ACC can remain amorphous for years under ambient conditions, demonstrating remarkable long-term stability. The best effective method to stabilize ACC lifetime is by forming it in the presence of magnesium and/or phosphorus. Also, ACC crystallisation pathways have been observed to depend on its Mg/Ca ratio, transforming to aragonite, Mg-calcite, monohydrocalcite or dolomite with increasing Mg content. Huang et al. managed to stabilize ACC using polyacrylic acid for several months, while Loste et al. showed that magnesium ions can increase ACC stability as well. But only the discovery that aspartic acid, glycine, citrate, and phosphorylated amino acids can produce long term stable ACC have opened the door for production commercialization. Synthetic ACC have been found to be conductive. Chemical environment of carbon and proton in synthetic ACC are found to be similar to that its crystalline polymorph which is monohydrocalcite.

== Highly porous ACC ==
Highly porous ACC has been synthesized using a surfactant-free method. In this method CaO is dispersed in methanol under a pressure of carbon dioxide in a sealed reaction vessel. ACC with surface area over 350 m2/g was synthesized using this method. Highly porous ACC appeared to be made up aggregated nanoparticles with dimensions less than 10 nm in size. Highly porous ACC was also found to be stable in ambient conditions for up to 3 weeks with most of its porosity retained.

== Applications and uses ==
Bioavailability: Since 2013 a company named Amorphical Ltd. sells an ACC dietary supplement. Calcium carbonate is used as a calcium supplement worldwide, however, it is known that its bioavailability is very low, only around 20–30%. ACC is roughly 40% more bioavailable than crystalline calcium carbonate.

Drug delivery: Due to the ability to tune the size and morphology of the amorphous calcium carbonate particles (as well as other calcium carbonate particles), they have huge applications in drug delivery systems. Highly porous ACC showed the ability to stabilize poorly soluble drug molecules in its extensive pore system and could also enhance the drug release rates of these drugs.

Paleoclimate reconstruction: A better understanding of the transformation process from amorphous to crystalline calcium carbonate will improve reconstructions of past climates that use chemical and biological proxies. For example, the calibrations of the clumped ^{13}C-^{18}O carbonate paleothermometer and understanding the origins and evolution of skeletal structures.

Environmental remediation: Improving environmental remediation efforts through gaining insight into the roles of earth materials in biogeochemical cycling of nutrients and metals through better understandings of the properties of environmental mineral phases involved in elemental uptake and release

Material science: Improving nanomaterials design and synthesis such as improving photovoltaic, photocatalytic, and thermoelectric materials for energy applications or improving biomedical cementations. Also improving framework material development for CO_{2} capture, H_{2} storage, emissions control, biomass conversion, molecular separations, and biofuel purification.
