= Monohydrocalcite =

Hydrate form of calcium carbonate

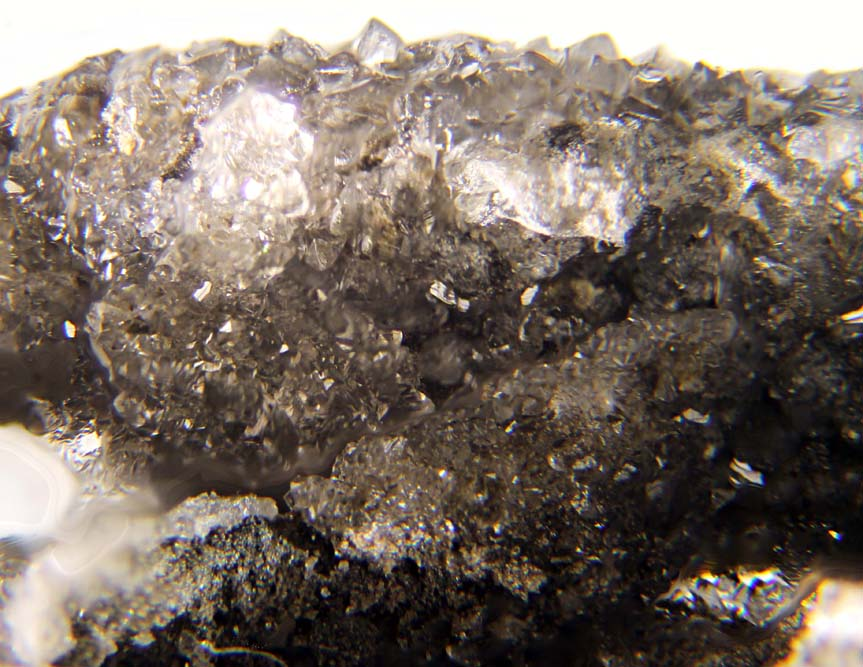
- Colorless monohydrocalcite crystals

General
- Category: Carbonate minerals
- Formula: CaCO_{3}·H_{2}O
- IMA symbol: Mhcal
- Strunz classification: 5.CB.20
- Crystal system: Trigonal
- Crystal class: Trapezohedral (32) (same H-M symbol)
- Space group: P3_{1}21

Structure
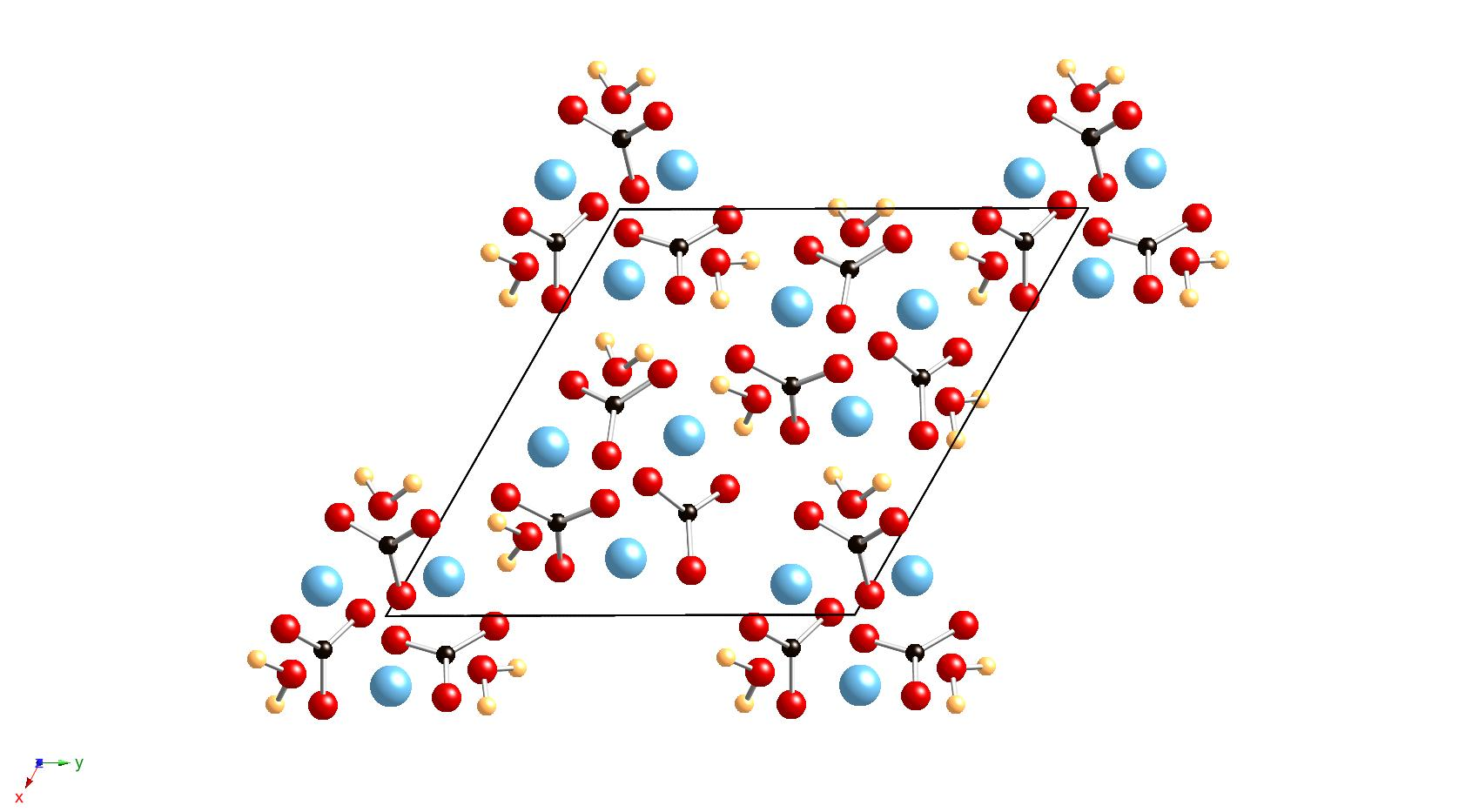
- The crystal structure of monohydrocalcite. Ca is shown as a blue atom, O atoms red, and the carbonate anion and water molecules are shown as bonded entities.

Identification

Monohydrocalcite is a mineral that is a hydrous form of calcium carbonate, CaCO_{3}·H_{2}O. It was formerly also known by the name hydrocalcite, which is now discredited by the IMA. It is a trigonal mineral which is white when pure. Monohydrocalcite is not a common rock-forming mineral, but is frequently associated with other calcium and magnesium carbonate minerals, such as calcite, aragonite, lansfordite, and nesquehonite.

Monohydrocalcite has been observed in air conditioning systems, and in moonmilk deposits in caves, both probably formed from spray of carbonate rich fluids. It is well known in Robe on the Limestone Coast of South Australia as a component of beach sands of Lake Fellmongery and Lake Butler, where it is believed to be formed from algal spume. Other lacustrine deposits include Lake Issyk-Kul, Kyrgyzstan, Lake Kivu, Democratic Republic of the Congo, and Solar Lake, Sinai.

It has been reported as a significant component of the decomposition of ikaite in the towers of the Ikka Fjord, West Greenland. It is also noted for its bizarre occurrences, which include inside the otoliths of the tiger shark, the bladder of a guinea pig, the calcareous corpuscles of a cestode parasite, and the final stages of decomposition of the putrefying flesh of the giant saguaro cactus. These occurrences suggest a biochemical origin is possible.

== Formation of monohydrocalcite ==
Monohydrocalcite forms via a Mg-rich amorphous calcium carbonate (ACC) precursor. This Mg-rich ACC forms rapidly (seconds) and then transforms to monohydrocalcite via dissolution and reprecipitation, with monohydrocalcite forming via a nucleation-controlled reaction like spherulitic growth.

Recent studies have highlighted the importance of Mg in the formation process of monohydrocalcite. The presence of Mg in solution is known to inhibit the formation of vaterite and calcite. However, the hydrated nature of monohydrocalcite means that full dehydration of Mg is not required before incorporation of this ion into this mineral and therefore it will more likely form than the anhydrous calcium carbonate phases.
