= Solar Lake =

- Location within Egypt
- Coordinates: 29°25′20.82″N 34°49′47.81″E
- Type: Endorheic, Salt lake
- Primary inflows: Gulf of Aqaba
- Primary outflows: Seepage, evaporation
- Max. length: 140 m (460 ft)
- Max. width: 50 m (160 ft)
- Average depth: 4–6 m (13–20 ft)
- Water volume: 10,244 m^{3} (8.305 acre⋅ft)
- Residence time: 5.5-6 months
- Surface elevation: Varies, near sea-level

Solar Lake (Arabic: بركة الشمس Birkat aš-Šams) is a saline desert lake located on the edge of the Red Sea, about 18 km south of Eilat in the Sinai Peninsula, Taba, Egypt, close to its borders with Israel. A small lake of high salinity, it is the site of complex biochemical phenomena, linked to cycles of evaporation and of infiltration of waters.

Solar Lake became isolated from the Red Sea as littoral sediments closed off an embayment between two rocky headlands. The saline waters of the Gulf of Aqaba that seep into Solar Lake are further concentrated by evaporation in the lake. It is believed that in addition to losses from evaporation, there is a crack system at the bottom of the lake.

Monohydrocalcite and other carbonates appear to be deposited in Solar Lake by the action of benthic cyanobacterial mats (stromatolite), which may be 1 m thick.

At night the top metre of surface water loses heat to the cold desert air but insulates the lower layer. The insulated lower layer continues to gain solar energy each day and to accumulate heavy brine from above. Solar Lake develops some of the highest temperature solar-heated waters of any lake: certain layers can reach as high as 60 °C, temperatures matched only by some geothermal lakes. Due to the strong layering during certain times, the thermal gradients can be as high as 18 °C/m.

In the summer, the lake turns over and becomes well-mixed thermally and in salinity. The residence time of water in the lake is believed to be 5.5–6 months.

== See also ==
- The Bear Lake in Sovata, Romania, is another example of this physical phenomenon.
- A solar pond is also a system for storing solar energy in a volume of highly saline water using the same principles as occur naturally Solar Lake.
