= Calcium carbonate =

Chemical compound

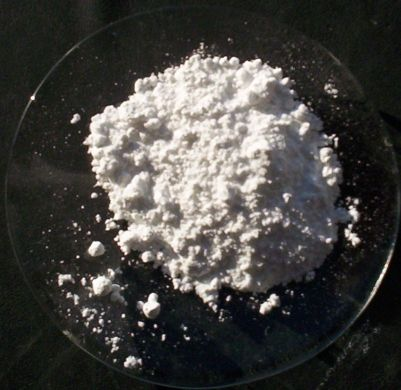

Names
- IUPAC name Calcium carbonate
- Other names: Aragonite; Calcite; Chalk; Lime; Limestone; Marble; Oystershell; Pearl

Identifiers
| CAS Number | 471-34-1 |
| 3D model (JSmol) | Interactive image; Interactive image |
| ChEBI | CHEBI:3311 |
| ChEMBL | ChEMBL1200539 |
| ChemSpider | 9708 |
| DrugBank | DB06724 |
| ECHA InfoCard | 100.006.765 |
| EC Number | 207-439-9 |
| E number | E170 (colours) |
| KEGG | D00932 |
| PubChem CID | 10112 |
| RTECS number | FF9335000 |
| UNII | H0G9379FGK |
| CompTox Dashboard (EPA) | DTXSID3036238 |
- InChI: InChI=1S/CH2O3.Ca/c2-1(3)4;/h(H2,2,3,4);/q;+2/p-2 Key: VTYYLEPIZMXCLO-UHFFFAOYSA-L; InChI=1/CH2O3.Ca/c2-1(3)4;/h(H2,2,3,4);/q;+2/p-2 Key: VTYYLEPIZMXCLO-NUQVWONBAS
- SMILES: [Ca+2].[O-]C([O-])=O; C(=O)([O-])[O-].[Ca+2]

Properties
| Chemical formula | CaCO_{3} |
| Molar mass | 100.0869 g/mol |
| Appearance | Fine white powder or colorless crystals; chalky taste |
| Odor | odorless |
| Density | 2.711 g/cm^{3} (calcite); 2.83 g/cm^{3} (aragonite) |
| Melting point | 1,339 °C (2,442 °F; 1,612 K) (calcite); 825 °C (1,517 °F; 1,098 K) (aragonite) |
| Boiling point | decomposes |
| Solubility in water | 0.013 g/L (25 °C) |
| Solubility product (K_{sp}) | 3.3×10^{−9} |
| Solubility in dilute acids | soluble |
| Magnetic susceptibility (χ) | −3.82×10^{−5} cm^{3}/mol |
| Refractive index (n_{D}) | 1.59 |

Structure
| Crystal structure | Trigonal |
| Space group | 3̅2/m |

Thermochemistry
| Std molar entropy (S^{⦵}_{298}) | 93 J/(mol·K) |
| Std enthalpy of formation (Δ_{f}H^{⦵}_{298}) | −1207 kJ/mol |

Pharmacology
| ATC code | A02AC01 (WHO) A12AA04 (WHO) |

Hazards
| NFPA 704 (fire diamond) | 0 0 0 |
- Lethal dose or concentration (LD, LC)
| LD_{50} (median dose) | 6450 mg/kg (oral, rat) |
- NIOSH (US health exposure limits)
| PEL (Permissible) | TWA 15 mg/m^{3} (total) TWA 5 mg/m^{3} (resp) |
| Safety data sheet (SDS) | ICSC 1193 |

Related compounds
| Other anions | Calcium bicarbonate |
| Other cations | Beryllium carbonate; Magnesium carbonate; Strontium carbonate; Barium carbonate; Radium carbonate; Zinc carbonate; Cadmium carbonate; Lead(II) carbonate |
| Related compounds | Calcium sulfate |
- Except where otherwise noted, data are given for materials in their standard state (at 25 °C [77 °F], 100 kPa). verify (what is ?) Infobox references

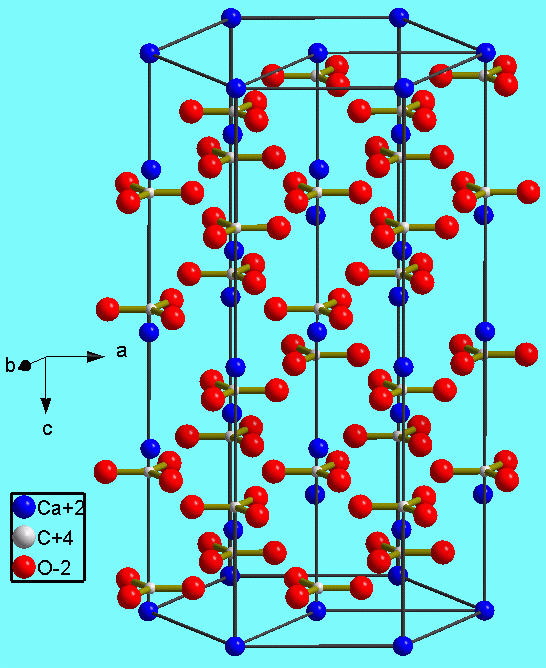
Crystal structure of calcite

Calcium carbonate is a chemical compound with the chemical formula CaCO_{3}. It is a common substance found in rocks as the minerals calcite and aragonite, most notably in chalk and limestone, eggshells, gastropod shells, shellfish skeletons and pearls. Materials containing much calcium carbonate or resembling it are described as calcareous.

Naturally occurring calcium carbonate is important part of the carbon cycle, sequestering large amounts of carbon in geological formations. When acidic rain or water enters a natural deposit of calcium carbonate, it can lead to cave formation with stalactite and stalagmite.

Calcium carbonate is the active ingredient in agricultural lime, an important ingredient for correcting soil chemistry. Limescale is calcium carbonate produced when calcium ions in hard water react with carbonate ions. Calcium carbonate has medical use as a calcium supplement or as an antacid, but excessive consumption can be hazardous and cause hypercalcemia and digestive issues. Other major uses include as an ingredient in construction materials, an ingredient in smelting iron and as a filler in paper or plastic.

== Chemistry ==
Calcium carbonate shares the typical properties of other carbonates. Notably, it:

- reacts with acids, releasing carbonic acid which quickly disintegrates into carbon dioxide and water:

CaCO_{3}(s) + 2 H^{+}(aq) → Ca^{2+}(aq) + CO_{2}(g) + H_{2}O(l)

- releases carbon dioxide upon heating, called a thermal decomposition reaction, or calcination (to above 840 °C in the case of CaCO_{3}), to form calcium oxide, CaO, commonly called quicklime, with reaction enthalpy 178 kJ/mol:

CaCO_{3}(s) → CaO(s) + CO_{2}(g)

- reacts with gaseous hydrogen to form methane and water vapor plus solid calcium oxide or calcium hydroxide depending on temperature and product gas composition. Various metals including palladium and nickel are catalysts for the reaction.

Calcium carbonate reacts with water that is saturated with carbon dioxide to form the soluble calcium bicarbonate.

CaCO_{3}(s) + CO_{2}(g) + H_{2}O(l) → Ca(HCO_{3})_{2}(aq)

This reaction is important in the erosion of carbonate rock, forming caverns, and leads to hard water in many regions.

An unusual form of calcium carbonate is the hexahydrate ikaite, CaCO_{3}·6H_{2}O. Ikaite is stable only below 8 °C.

== Preparation ==
The vast majority of calcium carbonate used in industry is extracted by mining or quarrying. Pure calcium carbonate (such as for food or pharmaceutical use), can be produced from a pure quarried source (usually marble), or prepared from calcium oxide. Water is added to give calcium hydroxide then carbon dioxide is passed through this solution to precipitate the desired calcium carbonate, referred to in the industry as precipitated calcium carbonate (PCC). This process is called carbonatation.

CaO + H_{2}O → Ca(OH)_{2}
Ca(OH)_{2} + CO_{2} → CaCO_{3} + H_{2}O

Calcium carbonate can be crystallized from calcium chloride (CaCl_{2}), by placing an aqueous solution of CaCl_{2} in a desiccator alongside ammonium carbonate [NH_{4}]_{2}CO_{3}. In the desiccator, ammonium carbonate is exposed to air and decomposes into ammonia, carbon dioxide, and water. The carbon dioxide then diffuses into the aqueous solution of calcium chloride, reacts with the calcium ions and the water, and forms calcium carbonate.

== Structure ==
The thermodynamically stable form of CaCO_{3} under normal conditions is hexagonal β-CaCO_{3} (the mineral calcite). Other forms can be prepared, the denser (2.83 g/cm^{3}) orthorhombic λ-CaCO_{3} (the mineral aragonite) and hexagonal μ-CaCO_{3}, occurring as the mineral vaterite. The aragonite form can be prepared by precipitation at temperatures above 85 °C; the vaterite form can be prepared by precipitation at 60 °C. Calcite contains calcium atoms coordinated by six oxygen atoms; in aragonite they are coordinated by nine oxygen atoms. The vaterite structure is not fully understood. Magnesium carbonate (MgCO_{3}) has the calcite structure, whereas strontium carbonate (SrCO_{3}) and barium carbonate (BaCO_{3}) adopt the aragonite structure, reflecting their larger ionic radii.

== Polymorphs ==
Calcium carbonate crystallizes in three anhydrous polymorphs, of which calcite is the thermodynamically most stable at room temperature, aragonite is only slightly less so, and vaterite is the least stable.

=== Crystal structure ===
The calcite crystal structure is trigonal, with space group R3̅c (No. 167 in the International Tables for Crystallography), and Pearson symbol hR10. Aragonite is orthorhombic, with space group Pmcn (No 62), and Pearson Symbol oP20. Vaterite is composed of at least two different coexisting crystallographic structures. The major structure exhibits hexagonal symmetry in space group P6_{3}/mmc, the minor structure is still unknown.

=== Crystallization ===
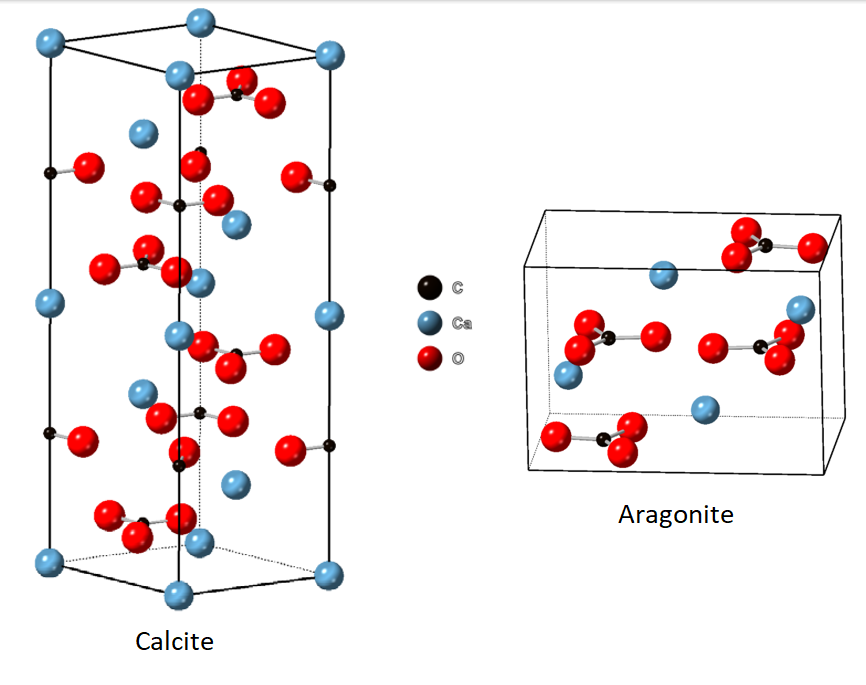
Crystal structure of calcite and aragonite

All three polymorphs crystallize simultaneously from aqueous solutions under ambient conditions. In additive-free aqueous solutions, calcite forms easily as the major product, while aragonite appears only as a minor product.

At high saturation, vaterite is typically the first phase precipitated, which is followed by a transformation of the vaterite to calcite. This behavior seems to follow Ostwald's rule, in which the least stable polymorph crystallizes first, followed by the crystallization of different polymorphs via a sequence of increasingly stable phases. However, aragonite, whose stability lies between those of vaterite and calcite, seems to be the exception to this rule, as aragonite does not form as a precursor to calcite under ambient conditions.

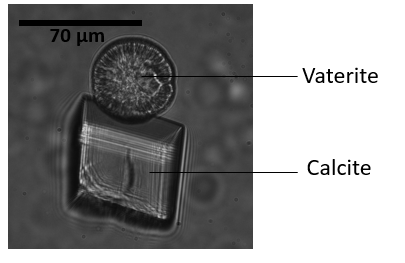
Microscopic calcite and vaterite

Aragonite occurs in majority when the reaction conditions inhibit the formation of calcite and/or promote the nucleation of aragonite. For example, the formation of aragonite is promoted by the presence of magnesium ions, or by using proteins and peptides derived from biological calcium carbonate. Some polyamines such as cadaverine and Poly(ethylene imine) have been shown to facilitate the formation of aragonite over calcite. Solid‑state NMR analysis has revealed that poly‑aspartate-stabilized ACC contains water molecules that undergo millisecond-timescale flips, illustrating dynamic hydration as a key factor in delaying crystallization.

=== Selection by organisms ===
Organisms, such as molluscs and arthropods, have shown the ability to grow all three crystal polymorphs of calcium carbonate, mainly as protection (shells) and muscle attachments. Moreover, they exhibit a remarkable capability of phase selection over calcite and aragonite, and some organisms can switch between the two polymorphs. The ability of phase selection is usually attributed to the use of specific macromolecules or combinations of macromolecules by such organisms.

== Occurrence ==
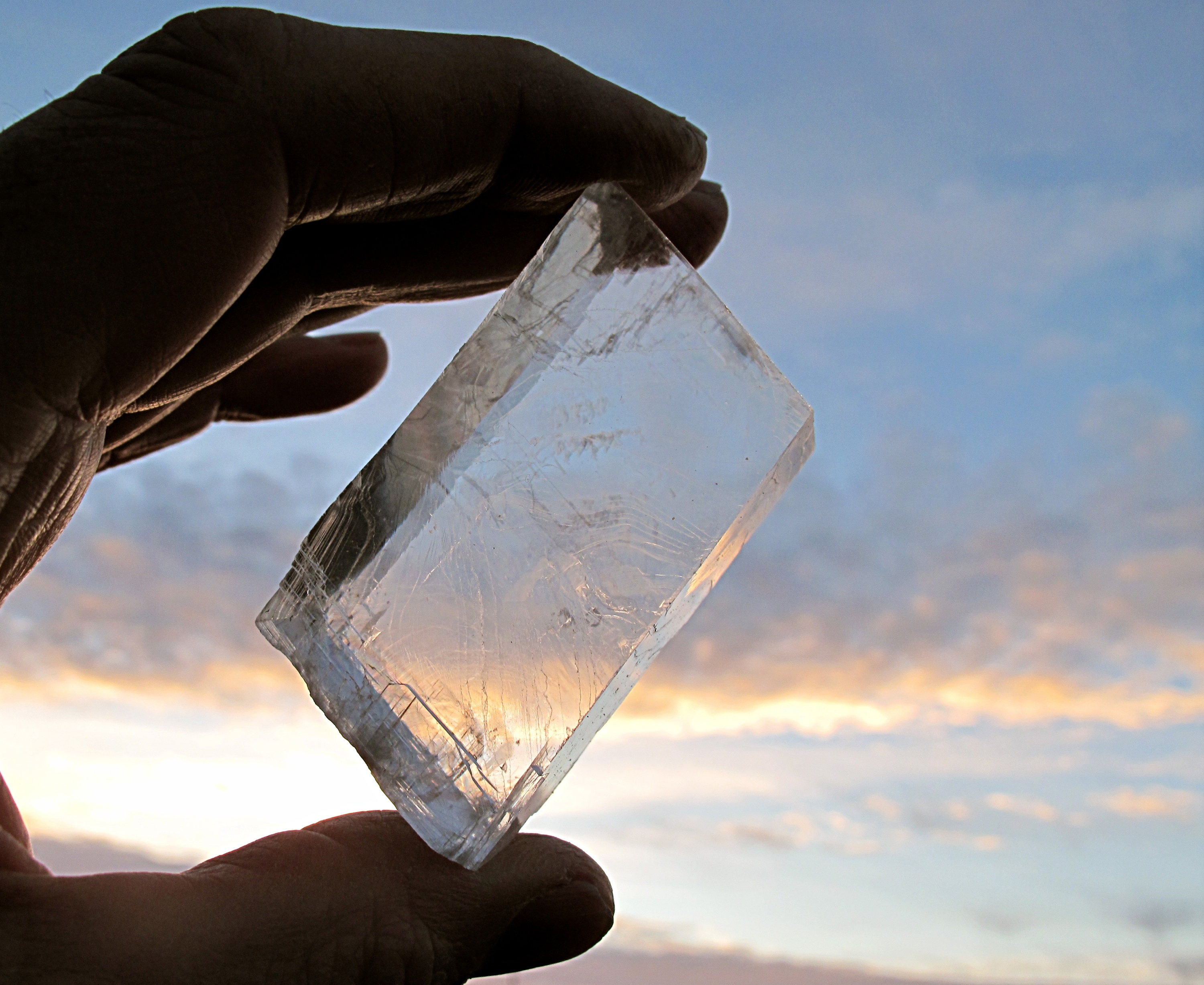
Calcite is the most stable polymorph of calcium carbonate. It is transparent to opaque. A transparent variety called Iceland spar (shown here) was used to create polarized light in the 19th century.

=== Geological sources ===
Calcite, aragonite and vaterite are pure calcium carbonate minerals. Industrially important source rocks which are predominantly calcium carbonate include limestone, chalk, marble and travertine.

=== Biological sources ===
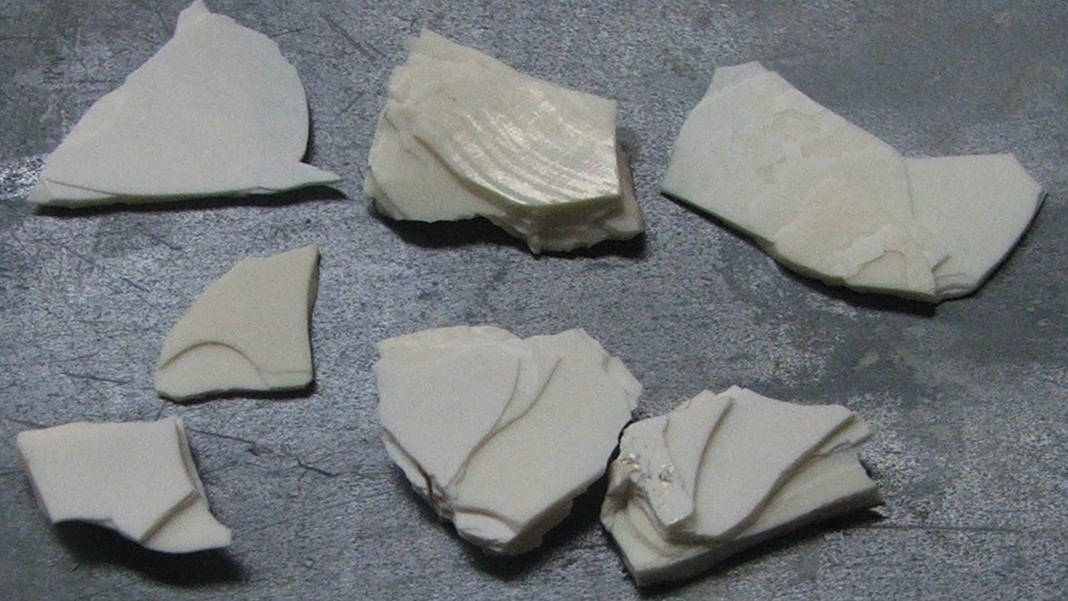
Calcium carbonate chunks from clamshell

Eggshells, snail shells and most seashells are predominantly calcium carbonate and can be used as industrial sources of that chemical. Oyster shells have experienced recognition as a source of dietary calcium since the early 2010s, but also remain a practical industrial source. Dark green vegetables such as broccoli and kale contain dietarily significant amounts of calcium carbonate, but they not practical as an industrial source.

Annelids in the family Lumbricidae, earthworms, possess a regionalization of the digestive track called calciferous glands, Kalkdrüsen, or glandes de Morren, that processes calcium and CO_{2} into calcium carbonate, which is later excreted into the dirt. The function of these glands is unknown but is believed to serve as a CO_{2} regulation mechanism within the animals' tissues. This process is ecologically significant, stabilizing the pH of acid soils.

=== Extraterrestrial ===
Beyond Earth, strong evidence suggests the presence of calcium carbonate on Mars. Signs of calcium carbonate have been detected at more than one location (notably at Gusev and Huygens craters). This provides some evidence for the past presence of liquid water.

== Geology ==
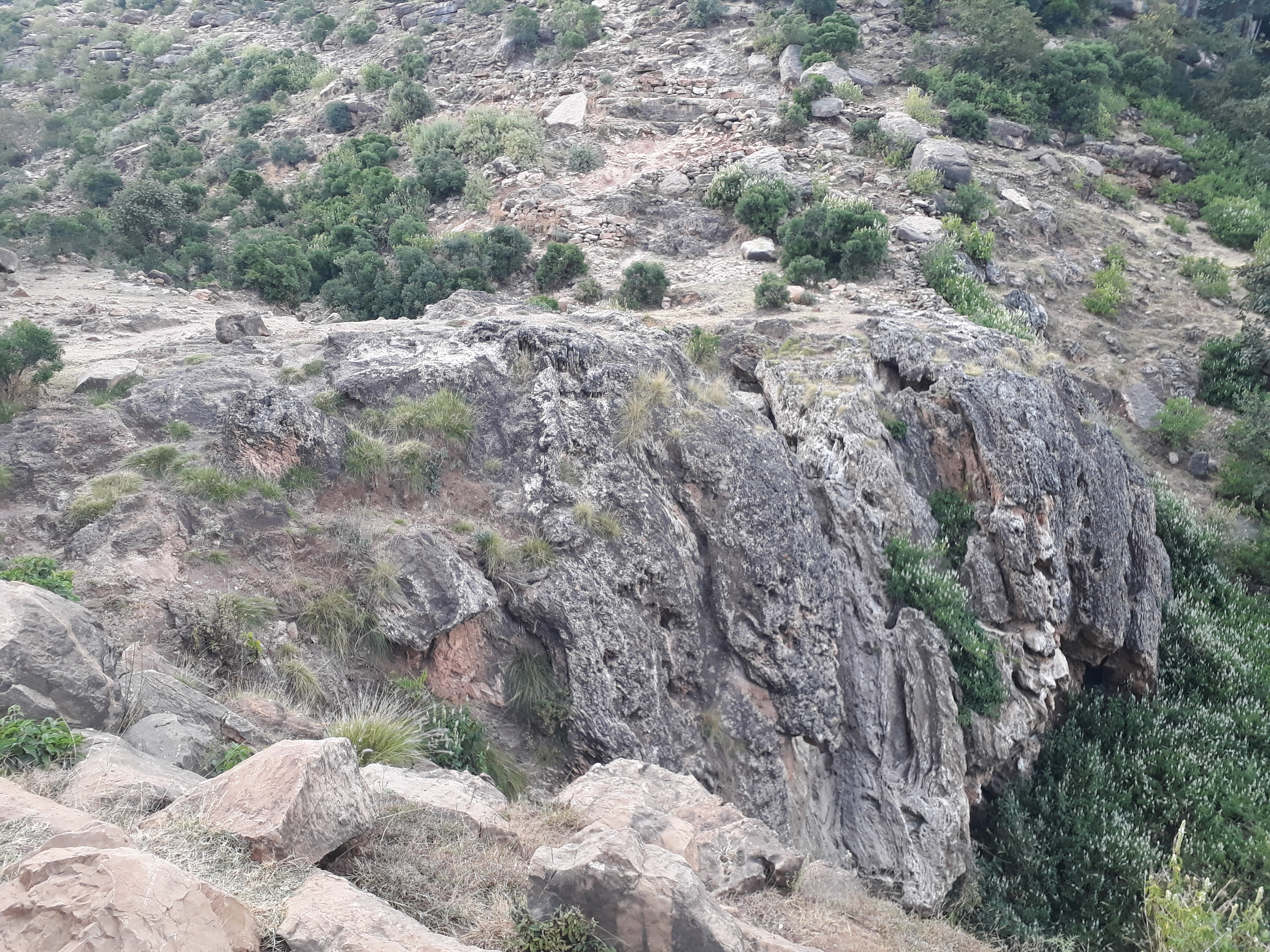
Surface precipitation of CaCO_{3} as tufa in Rubaksa, Ethiopia

Carbonate is found frequently in geologic settings and constitutes an enormous carbon reservoir. Calcium carbonate occurs as aragonite, calcite and dolomite as significant constituents of the calcium cycle. The carbonate minerals form the rock types: limestone, chalk, marble, travertine, tufa, and others.

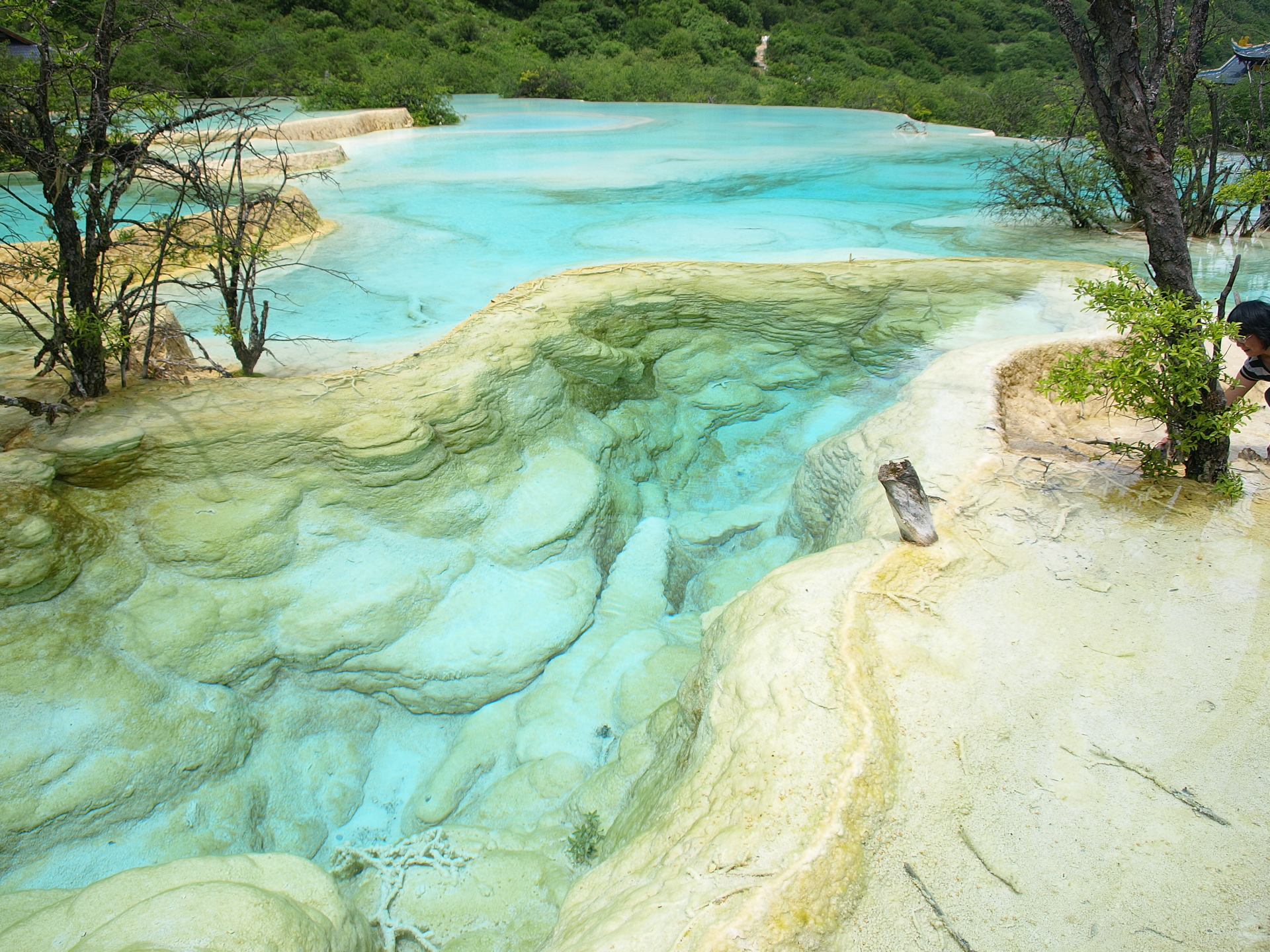
Tufa at Huanglong, Sichuan

In warm, clear tropical waters corals are more abundant than towards the poles where the waters are cold. Calcium carbonate contributors, including plankton (such as coccoliths and planktic foraminifera), coralline algae, sponges, brachiopods, echinoderms, bryozoa and mollusks, are typically found in shallow water environments where sunlight and filterable food are more abundant. Cold-water carbonates do exist at higher latitudes but have a very slow growth rate. The calcification processes are changed by ocean acidification.

Where the oceanic crust is subducted under a continental plate sediments will be carried down to warmer zones in the asthenosphere and lithosphere. Under these conditions calcium carbonate decomposes to produce carbon dioxide which, along with other gases, give rise to explosive volcanic eruptions.

=== Carbonate compensation depth ===
The carbonate compensation depth (CCD) is the point in the ocean where the rate of precipitation of calcium carbonate is balanced by the rate of dissolution due to the conditions present. Deep in the ocean, the temperature drops and pressure increases. Increasing pressure also increases the solubility of calcium carbonate. Calcium carbonate is unusual in that its solubility increases with decreasing temperature. The carbonate compensation depth ranges from 4,000 to 6,000 meters below sea level in modern oceans, and the various polymorphs (calcite, aragonite) have different compensation depths based on their stability.

=== Role in taphonomy ===
Calcium carbonate can preserve fossils through permineralization. Most of the vertebrate fossils of the Two Medicine Formation—a geologic formation known for its duck-billed dinosaur eggs—are preserved by CaCO_{3} permineralization. This type of preservation conserves high levels of detail, even down to the microscopic level. However, it also leaves specimens vulnerable to weathering when exposed to the surface.

Trilobite populations were once thought to have composed the majority of aquatic life during the Cambrian, due to the fact that their calcium carbonate-rich shells were more easily preserved than those of other species, which had purely chitinous shells.

== Uses ==
=== Construction ===
The main use of calcium carbonate is in the construction industry, either as a building material, as limestone aggregate for road building, as an ingredient of cement, or as the starting material for the preparation of builders' lime by heating in a kiln. However, because of weathering mainly caused by acid rain, calcium carbonate (in limestone form) is no longer used for building purposes on its own, but only as a raw primary substance for building materials.

Calcium carbonate is also used in the purification of iron from iron ore in a blast furnace. The carbonate is calcined in situ to give calcium oxide, which forms a slag with various impurities present, and separates from the purified iron.

In the oil industry, calcium carbonate is added to drilling fluids as a formation-bridging and filtercake-sealing agent; it is also a weighting material which increases the density of drilling fluids to control the downhole pressure. Calcium carbonate is added to swimming pools, as a pH corrector for maintaining alkalinity and offsetting the acidic properties of the disinfectant agent.

It is also used as a raw material in the refining of sugar from sugar beet; it is calcined in a kiln with anthracite to produce calcium oxide and carbon dioxide. This burnt lime is then slaked in fresh water to produce a calcium hydroxide suspension for the precipitation of impurities in raw juice during carbonatation.

Calcium carbonate in the form of chalk has traditionally been a major component of blackboard chalk. However, modern manufactured chalk is mostly gypsum, hydrated calcium sulfate CaSO_{4}·2H_{2}O. Calcium carbonate is a main source for growing biorock. Precipitated calcium carbonate (PCC), pre-dispersed in slurry form, is a common filler material for latex gloves with the aim of achieving maximum saving in material and production costs.

Fine ground calcium carbonate (GCC) is an essential ingredient in the microporous film used in diapers and some building films, as the pores are nucleated around the calcium carbonate particles during the manufacture of the film by biaxial stretching. GCC and PCC are used as a filler in paper because they are cheaper than wood fiber. Printing and writing paper can contain 10–20% calcium carbonate. In North America, calcium carbonate has begun to replace kaolin in the production of glossy paper. Europe has been practicing this as alkaline papermaking or acid-free papermaking for some decades. PCC used for paper filling and paper coatings is precipitated and prepared in a variety of shapes and sizes having characteristic narrow particle size distributions and equivalent spherical diameters of 0.4 to 3 micrometers.

Calcium carbonate is widely used as an extender in paints, in particular matte emulsion paint where typically 30% by weight of the paint is either chalk or marble. It is also a popular filler in plastics. Some typical examples include around 15–20% loading of chalk in unplasticized polyvinyl chloride (uPVC) drainpipes, 5–15% loading of stearate-coated chalk or marble in uPVC window profile. PVC cables can use calcium carbonate at loadings of up to 70 phr (parts per hundred parts of resin) to improve mechanical properties (tensile strength and elongation) and electrical properties (volume resistivity). Polypropylene compounds are often filled with calcium carbonate to increase rigidity, a requirement that becomes important at high usage temperatures. Here the percentage is often 20–40%. It also routinely used as a filler in thermosetting resins (sheet and bulk molding compounds) and has also been mixed with ABS, and other ingredients, to form some types of compression molded "clay" poker chips. Precipitated calcium carbonate, made by dropping calcium oxide into water, is used by itself or with additives as a white paint, known as whitewashing.

Calcium carbonate is added to a wide range of trade and do it yourself adhesives, sealants, and decorating fillers. Ceramic tile adhesives typically contain 70% to 80% limestone. Decorating crack fillers contain similar levels of marble or dolomite. It is also mixed with putty in setting stained glass windows, and as a resist to prevent glass from sticking to kiln shelves when firing glazes and paints at high temperature.

In ceramic glaze applications, calcium carbonate is known as whiting, and is a common ingredient for many glazes in its white powdered form. When a glaze containing this material is fired in a kiln, the whiting acts as a flux material in the glaze. Ground calcium carbonate is an abrasive (both as scouring powder and as an ingredient of household scouring creams), in particular in its calcite form, which has the relatively low hardness level of 3 on the Mohs scale, and will therefore not scratch glass and most other ceramics, enamel, bronze, iron, and steel, and have a moderate effect on softer metals like aluminium and copper. A paste made from calcium carbonate and deionized water can be used to clean tarnish on silver.

=== Health and diet ===
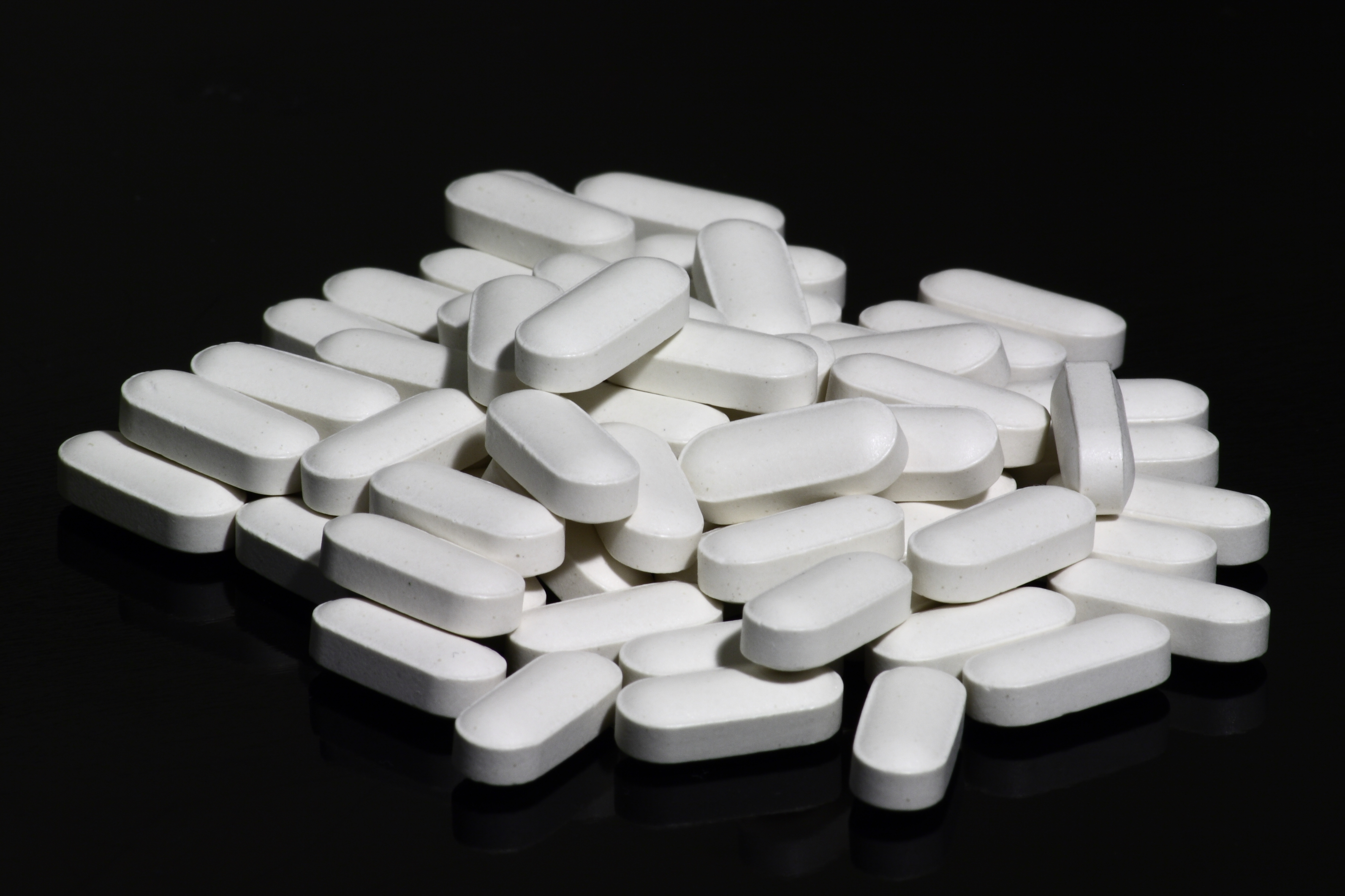
500-milligram calcium supplements made from calcium carbonate

Calcium carbonate is widely used medicinally as an inexpensive dietary calcium supplement or gastric antacid (such as Tums and Eno). It may be used as a phosphate binder for the treatment of hyperphosphatemia (primarily in patients with chronic kidney failure). It is used in the pharmaceutical industry as an inert filler for tablets and other pharmaceuticals.

Calcium carbonate is used in the production of calcium oxide as well as toothpaste and has seen a resurgence as a food preservative and color retainer, when used in or with products such as organic apples.

Calcium carbonate is used therapeutically as phosphate binder in patients on maintenance haemodialysis. It is the most common form of phosphate binder prescribed, particularly in non-dialysis chronic kidney disease. Calcium carbonate is the most commonly used phosphate binder, but clinicians are increasingly prescribing the more expensive, non-calcium-based phosphate binders, particularly sevelamer.

Excess calcium from supplements, fortified food, and high-calcium diets can cause milk-alkali syndrome, which has serious toxicity and can be fatal. In 1915, Bertram Sippy introduced the "Sippy regimen" of hourly ingestion of milk and cream, and the gradual addition of eggs and cooked cereal, for 10 days, combined with alkaline powders, which provided symptomatic relief for peptic ulcer disease. Over the next several decades, the Sippy regimen resulted in kidney failure, alkalosis, and hypercalcaemia, mostly in men with peptic ulcer disease. These adverse effects were reversed when the regimen stopped, but it was fatal in some patients with protracted vomiting. Milk-alkali syndrome declined in men after effective treatments for peptic ulcer disease arose. Since the 1990s it has been most frequently reported in women taking calcium supplements above the recommended range of 1.2 to 1.5 grams daily, for prevention and treatment of osteoporosis, and is exacerbated by dehydration. Calcium has been added to over-the-counter products, which contributes to inadvertent excessive intake. Excessive calcium intake can lead to hypercalcemia, complications of which include vomiting, abdominal pain and altered mental status.

As a food additive it is designated E170, and it has an INS number of 170. Used as an acidity regulator, anticaking agent, stabilizer or color it is approved for usage in the EU, US and Australia and New Zealand. It is "added by law to all UK milled bread flour except wholemeal". It is used in some soy milk and almond milk products as a source of dietary calcium; at least one study suggests that calcium carbonate might be as bioavailable as the calcium in cow's milk. Calcium carbonate is also used as a firming agent in many canned and bottled vegetable products.

Several calcium supplement formulations have been documented to contain the chemical element lead, posing a public health concern. Lead is commonly found in natural sources of calcium.

=== Agriculture and aquaculture ===
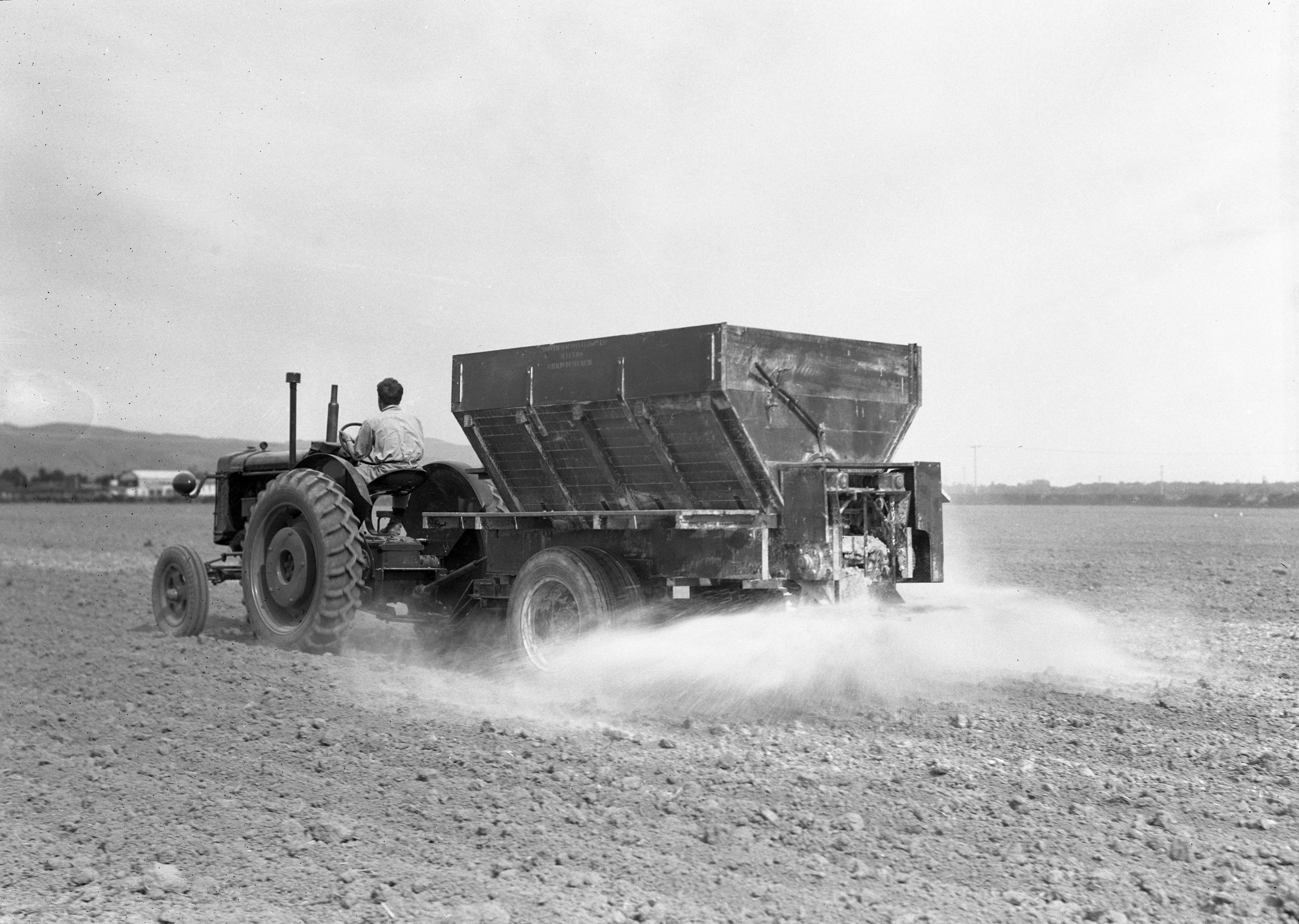
A bulk lime spreader operating at Canterbury Agricultural College, 1949

Agricultural lime, also called aglime, agricultural limestone, garden lime or liming, is a soil additive made from pulverized limestone or chalk. The primary active component is calcium carbonate. Additional chemicals vary depending on the mineral source and may include calcium oxide. Unlike the types of lime called quicklime (calcium oxide) and slaked lime (calcium hydroxide), powdered limestone does not require lime burning in a lime kiln; it only requires milling.

All of these types of lime are sometimes used as soil conditioners, with a common theme of providing a base to correct acidity, but lime for farm fields today is often crushed limestone. Historically, liming of farm fields in centuries past was often done with burnt lime; the difference is at least partially explained by the fact that affordable mass-production-scale fine milling of stone and ore relies on technologies developed since the mid-19th century.

=== Household cleaning ===
Calcium carbonate is a key ingredient in many household cleaning powders like Comet and is used as a scrubbing agent.

=== Pollution mitigation ===
In 1989, a researcher, Ken Simmons, introduced CaCO_{3} into the Whetstone Brook in Massachusetts. His hope was that the calcium carbonate would counter the acid in the stream from acid rain and save the trout that had ceased to spawn. Although his experiment was a success, it did increase the amount of aluminium ions in the area of the brook that was not treated with the limestone. This shows that CaCO_{3} can be added to neutralize the effects of acid rain in river ecosystems. Currently calcium carbonate is used to neutralize acidic conditions in both soil and water. Since the 1970s, such liming has been practiced on a large scale in Sweden to mitigate acidification and several thousand lakes and streams are limed repeatedly.

Calcium carbonate is also used in flue-gas desulfurization applications eliminating harmful SO_{2} and NO_{2} emissions from coal and other fossil fuels burnt in large fossil fuel power stations.

=== Plastics ===
Calcium carbonate is commonly used in the plastic industry as a filler. When it is incorporated in a plastic material, it can improve the hardness, stiffness, dimensional stability and processability of the material.

== Calcination equilibrium ==
Calcination of limestone using charcoal fires to produce quicklime has been practiced since antiquity by cultures all over the world. The temperature at which limestone yields calcium oxide is usually given as 825 °C, but stating an absolute threshold is misleading. Calcium carbonate exists in equilibrium with calcium oxide and carbon dioxide at any temperature. At each temperature there is a partial pressure of carbon dioxide that is in equilibrium with calcium carbonate. At room temperature the equilibrium overwhelmingly favors calcium carbonate, because the equilibrium CO_{2} pressure is only a tiny fraction of the partial CO_{2} pressure in air, which is about 0.035 kPa.

At temperatures above 550 °C the equilibrium CO_{2} pressure begins to exceed the CO_{2} pressure in air. So above 550 °C, calcium carbonate begins to outgas CO_{2} into air. However, in a charcoal fired kiln, the concentration of CO_{2} will be much higher than it is in air. Indeed, if all the oxygen in the kiln is consumed in the fire, then the partial pressure of CO_{2} in the kiln can be as high as 20 kPa.

The table shows that this partial pressure is not achieved until the temperature is nearly 800 °C. For the outgassing of CO_{2} from calcium carbonate to happen at an economically useful rate, the equilibrium pressure must significantly exceed the ambient pressure of CO_{2}. And for it to happen rapidly, the equilibrium pressure must exceed total atmospheric pressure of 101 kPa, which happens at 898 °C.

Equilibrium pressure of CO_{2} over CaCO_{3} (P) versus temperature (T).
| P (kPa) | 0.055 | 0.13 | 0.31 | 1.80 | 5.9 | 9.3 | 14 | 24 | 34 | 51 | 72 | 80 | 91 | 101 | 179 | 901 | 3961 |
| T (°C) | 550 | 587 | 605 | 680 | 727 | 748 | 777 | 800 | 830 | 852 | 871 | 881 | 891 | 898 | 937 | 1082 | 1241 |

== Solubility ==
=== With varying CO_{2} pressure ===
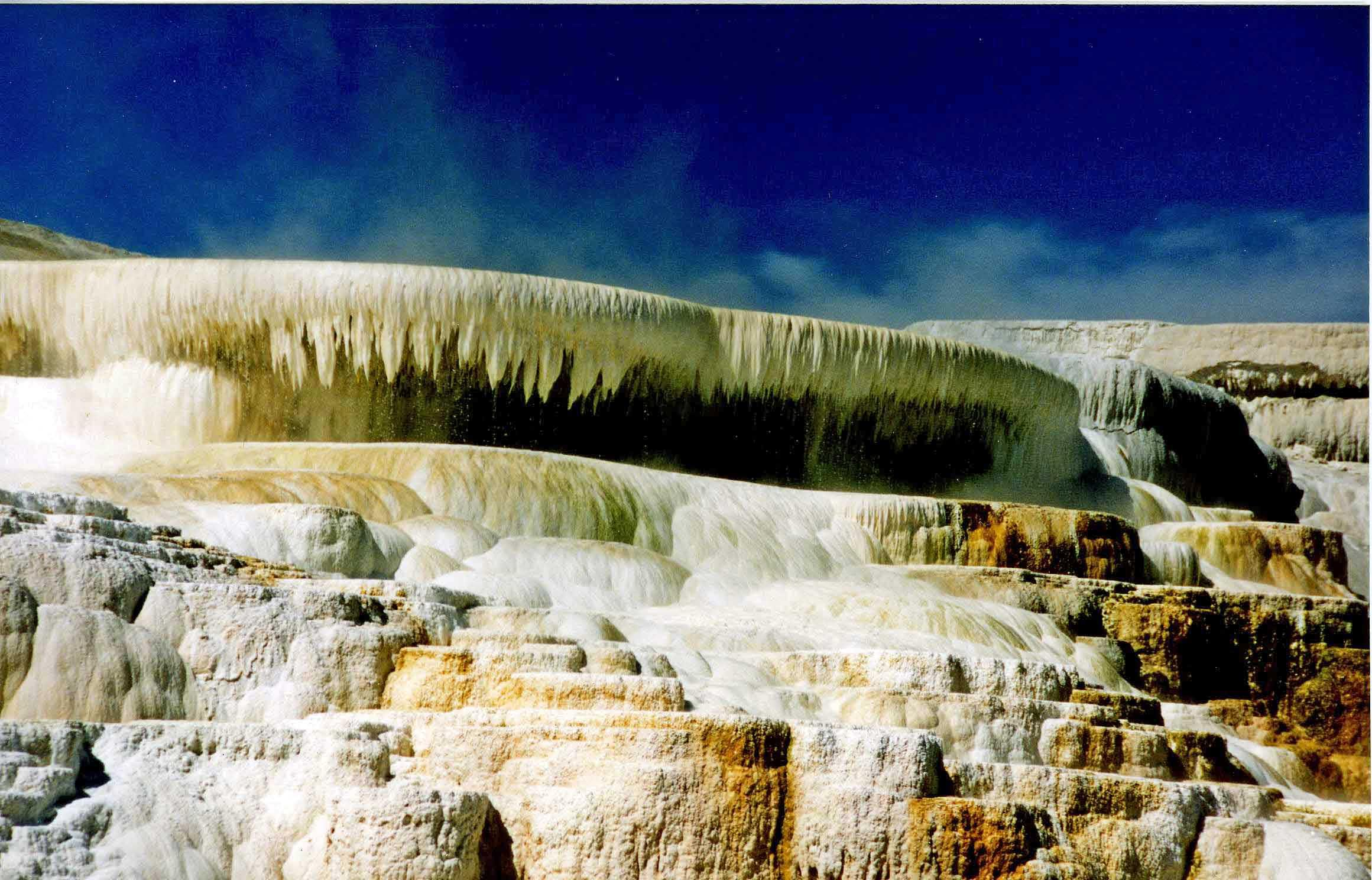
Travertine calcium carbonate deposits from a hot spring

Calcium carbonate is poorly soluble in pure water (47 mg/L at normal atmospheric CO_{2} partial pressure as shown below).

The equilibrium of its solution is given by the equation (with dissolved calcium carbonate on the right):

| CaCO_{3} ⇌ Ca^{2+} + CO^{2−}_{3} | K_{sp} = 3.7×10^{−9} to 8.7×10^{−9} at 25 °C |

where the solubility product for [Ca^{2+}][CO^{2−}_{3}] is given as anywhere from K_{sp} = 3.7×10^{−9} to K_{sp} = 8.7×10^{−9} at 25 °C, depending upon the data source. What the equation means is that the product of molar concentration of calcium ions (moles of dissolved Ca^{2+} per liter of solution) with the molar concentration of dissolved CO^{2−}_{3} cannot exceed the value of K_{sp}. This seemingly simple solubility equation, however, must be taken along with the more complicated equilibrium of carbon dioxide with water (see carbonic acid). Some of the CO^{2−}_{3} combines with H^{+} in the solution according to

| HCO^{−}_{3} ⇌ H^{+} + CO^{2−}_{3} | K_{a2} = 5.61×10^{−11} at 25 °C |

HCO^{−}_{3} is known as the bicarbonate ion. Calcium bicarbonate is many times more soluble in water than calcium carbonate—indeed it exists only in solution.

Some of the HCO^{−}_{3} combines with H^{+} in solution according to

| H_{2}CO_{3} ⇌ H^{+} + HCO^{−}_{3} | K_{a1} = 2.5×10^{−4} at 25 °C |

Some of the H_{2}CO_{3} breaks up into water and dissolved carbon dioxide according to

| H_{2}O + CO_{2}(aq) ⇌ H_{2}CO_{3} | K_{h} = 1.70×10^{−3} at 25 °C |

And dissolved carbon dioxide is in equilibrium with atmospheric carbon dioxide according to

| P_{CO_{2}}/[CO_{2}] = $H_{\rm v}$ | where $H_{\rm v}$ = 29.76 atm/(mol/L) at 25 °C (Henry volatility), and P_{CO_{2}} is the CO_{2} partial pressure. |

For ambient air, P_{CO_{2}} is around 3.5×10^{−4} atm (or equivalently 35 Pa). The last equation above fixes the concentration of dissolved CO_{2} as a function of P_{CO_{2}}, independent of the concentration of dissolved CaCO_{3}. At atmospheric partial pressure of CO_{2}, dissolved CO_{2} concentration is 1.2×10^{−5} moles per liter. The equation before that fixes the concentration of H_{2}CO_{3} as a function of CO_{2} concentration. For [CO_{2}] = 1.2×10^{−5}, it results in [H_{2}CO_{3}] = 2.0×10^{−8} moles per liter. When [H_{2}CO_{3}] is known, the remaining three equations together with

Calcium ion solubility as a function of CO_{2} partial pressure at 25 °C (K_{sp} = 4.47×10^{−9})
| P_{CO_{2}} (atm) | pH | [Ca^{2+}] (mol/L) |
|---|---|---|
| 10^{−12} | 12.0 | 5.19×10^{−3} |
| 10^{−10} | 11.3 | 1.12×10^{−3} |
| 10^{−8} | 10.7 | 2.55×10^{−4} |
| 10^{−6} | 9.83 | 1.20×10^{−4} |
| 10^{−4} | 8.62 | 3.16×10^{−4} |
| 3.5×10^{−4} | 8.27 | 4.70×10^{−4} |
| 10^{−3} | 7.96 | 6.62×10^{−4} |
| 10^{−2} | 7.30 | 1.42×10^{−3} |
| 10^{−1} | 6.63 | 3.05×10^{−3} |
| 1 | 5.96 | 6.58×10^{−3} |
| 10 | 5.30 | 1.42×10^{−2} |

| H_{2}O ⇌ H^{+} + OH^{−} | K = 10^{−14} at 25 °C |

(which is true for all aqueous solutions), and the constraint that the solution must be electrically neutral, i.e., the overall charge of dissolved positive ions [Ca^{2+}] + 2 [H^{+}] must be cancelled out by the overall charge of dissolved negative ions [HCO^{−}_{3}] + [CO^{2−}_{3}] + [OH^{−}], make it possible to solve simultaneously for the remaining five unknown concentrations (the previously mentioned form of the neutrality is valid only if calcium carbonate has been put in contact with pure water or with a neutral pH solution; in the case where the initial water solvent pH is not neutral, the balance is not neutral).

The adjacent table shows the result for [Ca^{2+}] and [H^{+}] (in the form of pH) as a function of ambient partial pressure of CO_{2} (K_{sp} = 4.47×10^{−9} has been taken for the calculation).

- At atmospheric levels of ambient CO_{2} the table indicates that the solution will be slightly alkaline with a maximum CaCO_{3} solubility of 47 mg/L.
- As ambient CO_{2} partial pressure is reduced below atmospheric levels, the solution becomes more and more alkaline. At extremely low P_{CO_{2}}, dissolved CO_{2}, bicarbonate ion, and carbonate ion largely evaporate from the solution, leaving a highly alkaline solution of calcium hydroxide, which is more soluble than CaCO_{3}. For P_{CO_{2}} = 10^{−12} atm, the [Ca^{2+}][OH^{−}]_{2} product is still below the solubility product of Ca(OH)_{2} (8×10^{−6}). For still lower CO_{2} pressure, Ca(OH)_{2} precipitation will occur before CaCO_{3} precipitation.
- As ambient CO_{2} partial pressure increases to levels above atmospheric, pH drops, and much of the carbonate ion is converted to bicarbonate ion, which results in higher solubility of Ca^{2+}.

The effect of the latter is especially evident in day-to-day life of people who have hard water. Water in aquifers underground can be exposed to levels of CO_{2} much higher than atmospheric. As such, water percolates through calcium carbonate rock, the CaCO_{3} dissolves according to one of the trends above. When that same water then emerges from the tap, in time, it comes into equilibrium with CO_{2} levels in the air by outgassing its excess CO_{2}. The calcium carbonate becomes less soluble as a result, and the excess precipitates as lime scale. This same process is responsible for the formation of stalactites and stalagmites in limestone caves.

Two hydrated phases of calcium carbonate, monohydrocalcite CaCO_{3}·H_{2}O and ikaite CaCO_{3}·6H_{2}O, may precipitate from water at ambient conditions and persist as metastable phases.

=== With varying pH, temperature and salinity: CaCO_{3} scaling in swimming pools ===
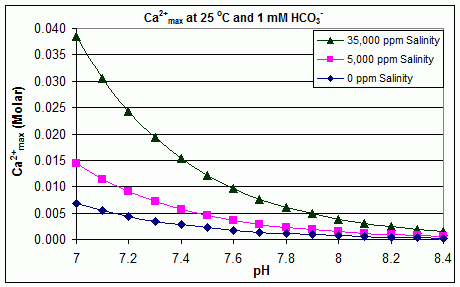

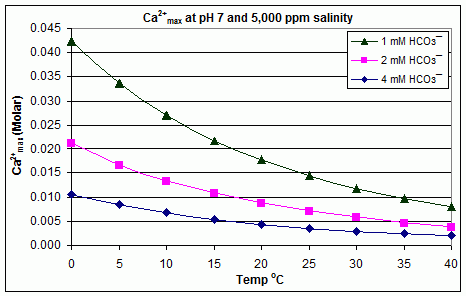

In contrast to the open equilibrium scenario above, many swimming pools are managed by addition of sodium bicarbonate (NaHCO_{3}) to the concentration of about 2 mmol/L as a buffer, then control of pH through use of HCl, NaHSO_{4}, Na_{2}CO_{3}, NaOH or chlorine formulations that are acidic or basic. In this situation, dissolved inorganic carbon (total inorganic carbon) is far from equilibrium with atmospheric CO_{2}. Progress towards equilibrium through outgassing of CO_{2} is slowed by

1. the slow reaction
  H_{2}CO_{3} ⇌ CO_{2}(aq) + H_{2}O;
2. limited aeration in a deep water column; and
3. periodic replenishment of bicarbonate to maintain buffer capacity (often estimated through measurement of total alkalinity).

In this situation, the dissociation constants for the much faster reactions

H_{2}CO_{3} ⇌ H^{+} + HCO^{−}_{3} ⇌ 2 H^{+} + CO^{2−}_{3}

allow the prediction of concentrations of each dissolved inorganic carbon species in solution, from the added concentration of HCO^{−}_{3} (which constitutes more than 90% of Bjerrum plot species from pH 7 to pH 8 at 25 °C in fresh water). Addition of HCO^{−}_{3} will increase CO^{2−}_{3} concentration at any pH. Rearranging the equations given above, we can see that [Ca^{2+}] = K_{sp}/([CO^{2−}_{3}]), and [CO^{2−}_{3}] = (K_{a2} [HCO^{−}_{3}])/([H^{+}]). Therefore, when HCO^{−}_{3} concentration is known, the maximum concentration of Ca^{2+} ions before scaling through CaCO_{3} precipitation can be predicted from the formula:

[Ca^{2+}]_{max} = K_{sp}/K_{a2} × ([H^{+}])/([HCO^{−}_{3}])

The solubility product for CaCO_{3} (K_{sp}) and the dissociation constants for the dissolved inorganic carbon species (including K_{a2}) are all substantially affected by temperature and salinity, with the overall effect that [Ca^{2+}]_{max} increases from freshwater to saltwater, and decreases with rising temperature, pH, or added bicarbonate level, as illustrated in the accompanying graphs.

The trends are illustrative for pool management, but whether scaling occurs also depends on other factors including interactions with Mg^{2+}, [B(OH)_{4}]^{−} and other ions in the pool, as well as supersaturation effects. Scaling is commonly observed in electrolytic chlorine generators, where there is a high pH near the cathode surface and scale deposition further increases temperature. This is one reason that some pool operators prefer borate over bicarbonate as the primary pH buffer, and avoid the use of pool chemicals containing calcium.

=== Solubility in a strong or weak acid solution ===
Solutions of strong (HCl), moderately strong (sulfamic) or weak (acetic, citric, sorbic, lactic, phosphoric) acids are commercially available. They are commonly used as descaling agents to remove limescale deposits. The maximum amount of CaCO_{3} that can be "dissolved" by one liter of an acid solution can be calculated using the above equilibrium equations.

- In the case of a strong monoacid with decreasing acid concentration [A] = [A^{−}], we obtain (with CaCO_{3} molar mass = 100 g/mol):

| [A] (mol/L) | 1 | 10^{−1} | 10^{−2} | 10^{−3} | 10^{−4} | 10^{−5} | 10^{−6} | 10^{−7} | 10^{−10} |
| Initial pH | 0.00 | 1.00 | 2.00 | 3.00 | 4.00 | 5.00 | 6.00 | 6.79 | 7.00 |
| Final pH | 6.75 | 7.25 | 7.75 | 8.14 | 8.25 | 8.26 | 8.26 | 8.26 | 8.27 |
| Dissolved CaCO_{3} (g/L of acid) | 50.0 | 5.00 | 0.514 | 0.0849 | 0.0504 | 0.0474 | 0.0471 | 0.0470 | 0.0470 |

where the initial state is the acid solution with no Ca^{2+} (not taking into account possible CO_{2} dissolution) and the final state is the solution with saturated Ca^{2+}. For strong acid concentrations, all species have a negligible concentration in the final state with respect to Ca^{2+} and A^{−} so that the neutrality equation reduces approximately to 2[Ca^{2+}] = [A^{−}] yielding [Ca^{2+}] ≈ 0.5 [A^{−}]. When the concentration decreases, [HCO^{−}_{3}] becomes non-negligible so that the preceding expression is no longer valid. For vanishing acid concentrations, one can recover the final pH and the solubility of CaCO_{3} in pure water.

- In the case of a weak monoacid (here we take acetic acid with pK_{a} = 4.76) with decreasing total acid concentration [A] = [A^{−}] + [AH], we obtain:

| [A] (mol/L) | [Ca^{2+}] ≈ 0.5 [A^{−}] | 10^{−1} | 10^{−2} | 10^{−3} | 10^{−4} | 10^{−5} | 10^{−6} | 10^{−7} | 10^{−10} |
| Initial pH | 2.38 | 2.88 | 3.39 | 3.91 | 4.47 | 5.15 | 6.02 | 6.79 | 7.00 |
| Final pH | 6.75 | 7.25 | 7.75 | 8.14 | 8.25 | 8.26 | 8.26 | 8.26 | 8.27 |
| Dissolved CaCO_{3} (g/L of acid) | 49.5 | 4.99 | 0.513 | 0.0848 | 0.0504 | 0.0474 | 0.0471 | 0.0470 | 0.0470 |

For the same total acid concentration, the initial pH of the weak acid is less acid than that of the strong acid; however, the maximum amount of CaCO_{3} which can be dissolved is approximately the same. This is because in the final state, the pH is larger than the pK_{a}, so that the weak acid is almost completely dissociated, yielding in the end as many H^{+} ions as the strong acid to "dissolve" the calcium carbonate.

- The calculation in the case of phosphoric acid (which is the most widely used for domestic applications) is more complicated since the concentrations of the four dissociation states corresponding to this acid must be calculated together with [HCO^{−}_{3}], [CO^{2−}_{3}], [Ca^{2+}], [H^{+}] and [OH^{−}]. The system may be reduced to a seventh degree equation for [H^{+}] the numerical solution of which gives

| [A] (mol/L) | 1 | 10^{−1} | 10^{−2} | 10^{−3} | 10^{−4} | 10^{−5} | 10^{−6} | 10^{−7} | 10^{−10} |
| Initial pH | 1.08 | 1.62 | 2.25 | 3.05 | 4.01 | 5.00 | 5.97 | 6.74 | 7.00 |
| Final pH | 6.71 | 7.17 | 7.63 | 8.06 | 8.24 | 8.26 | 8.26 | 8.26 | 8.27 |
| Dissolved CaCO_{3} (g/L of acid) | 62.0 | 7.39 | 0.874 | 0.123 | 0.0536 | 0.0477 | 0.0471 | 0.0471 | 0.0470 |

where [A] = [H_{3}PO_{4}] + [H_{2}PO^{−}_{4}] + [HPO^{2−}_{4}] + [PO^{3−}_{4}] is the total acid concentration. Thus phosphoric acid is more efficient than a monoacid since at the final almost neutral pH, the second dissociated state concentration [HPO^{2−}_{4}] is not negligible (see phosphoric acid).

== See also ==
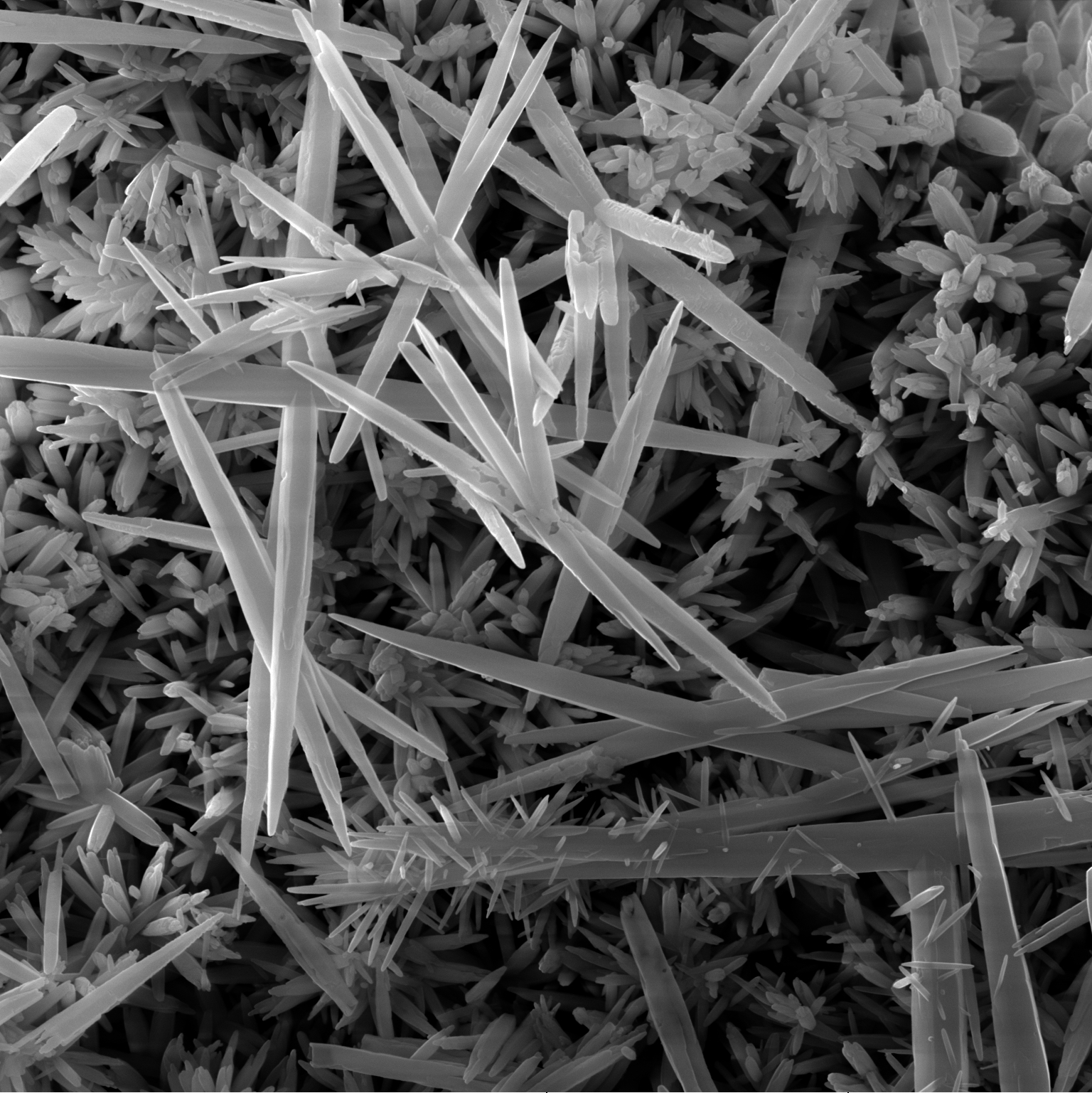
Electron micrograph of needle-like calcium carbonate crystals formed as limescale in a kettle

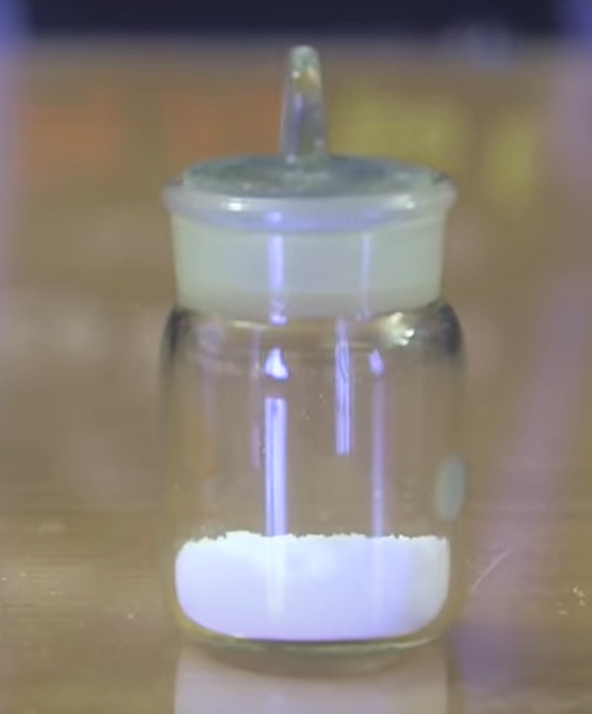
Around 2 g of calcium-48 carbonate

- Cuttlebone
- Cuttlefish
- Gesso
- Limescale
- Marble
- Ocean acidification
- Whiting event
- List of climate engineering topics
- Lysocline
