= Ikaite =

Hexahydrated calcium carbonate mineral

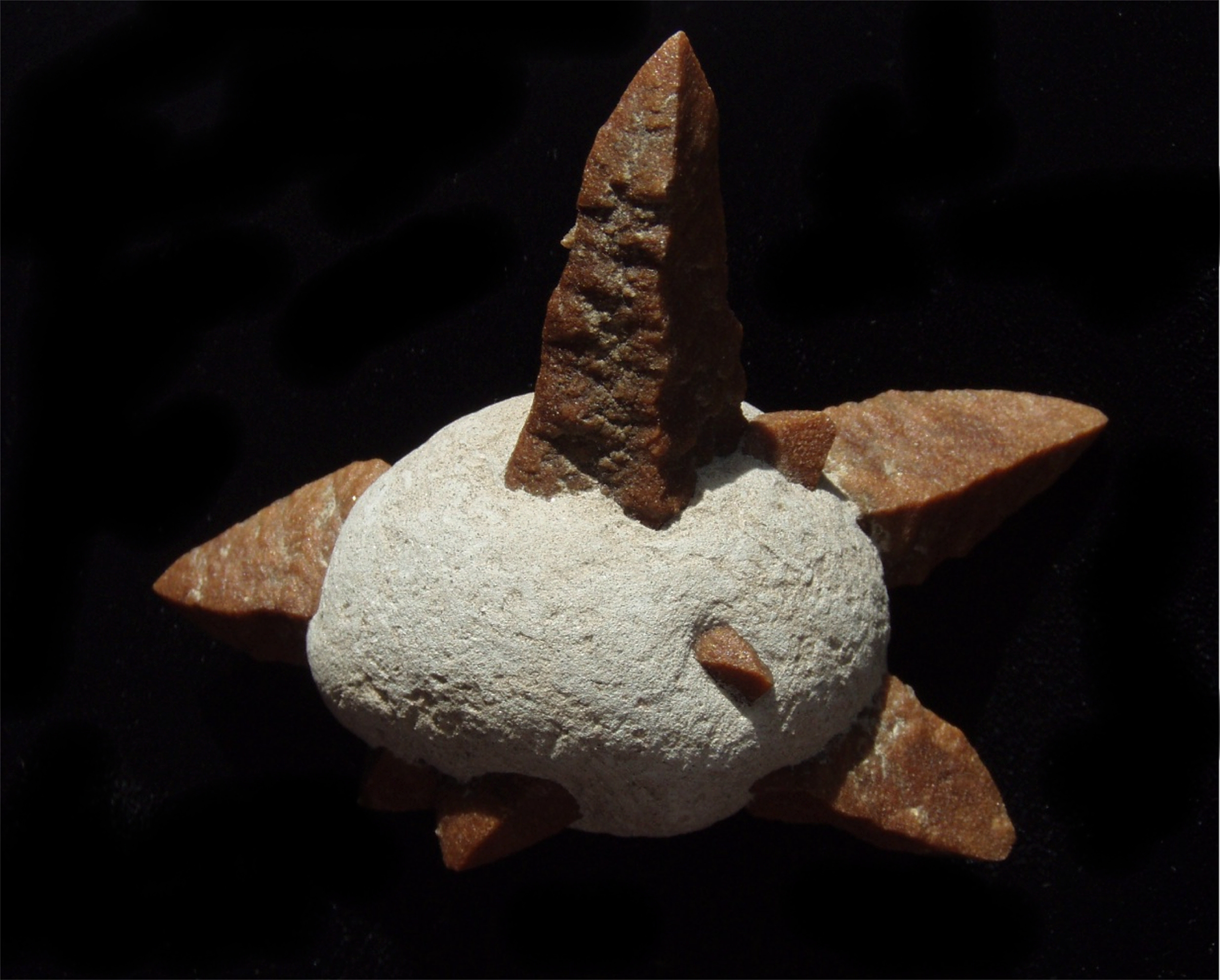
- Glendonite (calcite pseudomorph after ikaite)

General
- Category: Carbonate mineral, hydrous carbonates subgroup
- Formula: CaCO_{3}·6H_{2}O
- IMA symbol: Ika
- Strunz classification: 5.CB.25
- Crystal system: Monoclinic
- Crystal class: Prismatic (2/m) (same H-M symbol)
- Space group: C2/c

Identification
- Color: White when pure
- Crystal habit: Nearly square prism; pyramidal; sigmoidal: square prism capped with oppositely canted pyramids; massive, tubular (tinolite vr.)
- Mohs scale hardness: 3
- Luster: Dull
- Streak: White
- Specific gravity: 1.83
- Optical properties: Biaxial (−)
- Refractive index: n_{α} = 1.455 n_{β} = 1.538 n_{γ} = 1.545
- Birefringence: d = 0.090
- Other characteristics: Decomposes into water and calcite above 8 °C

Ikaite is the mineral name for the hexahydrate of calcium carbonate, CaCO_{3}·6H_{2}O. Ikaite tends to form very steep or spiky pyramidal crystals, often radially arranged, of varied sizes from thumbnail size aggregates to gigantic salient spurs. It is only found in a metastable state and decomposes rapidly by losing most of its water content once removed from near-freezing water. This "melting mineral" is more commonly known through its pseudomorphs. These pseudomorphs are known by a variety of names, including glendonite, thinolite, jarrowite, and fundylite.

== Distribution ==
It is usually considered a rare mineral, but this is likely due to difficulty in preserving samples. It was first discovered in nature by the Danish mineralogist Pauly in the Ikka Fjord in southwest Greenland, close to Ivittuut, the locality of the famous cryolite deposit. Here ikaite occurs in truly spectacular towers or columns (up to 18 m or 59 ft tall) growing out of the fjord floor towards the surface water, where they are naturally truncated by waves, or unnaturally by the occasional boat. At the Ikka Fjord, it is supposed that the ikaite towers are created as the result of a groundwater seep, rich in carbonate and bicarbonate ions, entering the fjord bottom in the form of springs, where it hits the marine fjord waters rich in calcium. Ikaite has also been reported as occurring in high-latitude marine sediments at Bransfield Strait, Antarctica; Sea of Okhotsk, Eastern Siberia, off Sakhalin; and Saanich Inlet, British Columbia, Canada. In addition, it has been reported in a deep sea fan off the Congo, and therefore probably has a worldwide occurrence. The most recent occurrence has been reported by Dieckmann et al. (2008). They found the mineral ikaite directly precipitated in grain sizes of hundreds of micrometers in sea ice in the Weddell Sea and throughout fast ice off Adélie Land, Antarctica. In addition, ikaite can also form large crystals within sediment that grow to macroscopic size, occasionally with good crystal form. There is strong evidence that some of these marine deposits are associated with cold seeps. Ikaite has also been reported as a cryogenic deposit in caves where it precipitates from freezing carbonate-rich water.

== Structure ==
Ikaite crystallizes in the monoclinic crystal system in space group C2/c with lattice parameters a~8.87A, b~8.23A, c~11.02A, β~110.2°. The structure of ikaite consists of an ion pair of (Ca^{2+}CO_{3}^{2−})^{0} surrounded by a cage of hydrogen-bonded water molecules which serve to isolate one ion pair from another.

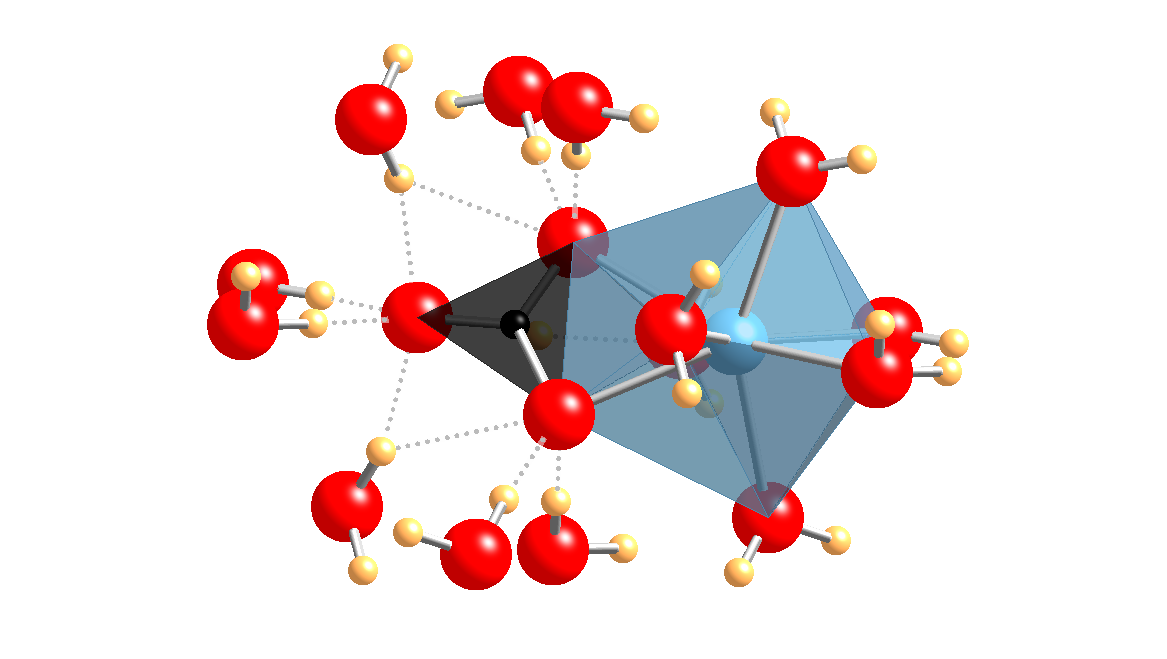
Ion pair (Ca^{2+}CO_{3}^{2−})^{0} and hydration cage. Part of the crystal structure of ikaite. Ca (blue) is in dodecahedral coordination with O atoms (red) of the carbonate (black planar) and water molecules, while hydrogen bonds (dotted) between H-atoms (yellow) of the water molecules to the O-atoms of the carbonate ion exist.

=== Stability ===
Synthetic ikaite was discovered in the nineteenth century in a study by Pelouze. Ikaite is only thermodynamically stable at moderate pressures, so when found near the Earth's surface is always metastable. Nevertheless, as it appears to be at least moderately common in nature, it is clear that the conditions for metastable nucleation and growth cannot be too restrictive. Cold water is certainly required for formation, and nucleation inhibitors like phosphate ions for the growth of anhydrous calcium carbonate phases, such as calcite, aragonite, and vaterite probably aid its formation and preservation. It is thought that perhaps the structure of calcium carbonate in a concentrated aqueous solution also consists of an ion pair, and this is why ikaite readily nucleates at low temperatures outside of its thermodynamic stability range. When removed from its natural cold water environment, ikaite rapidly disintegrates into monohydrocalcite or anhydrous calcium carbonate phases and water, earning the nickname of the melting mineral.

== Pseudomorphs ==
The presence of ikaite may be recorded through geological time through the presence of pseudomorphs of other calcium carbonate phases after it. Although it can be hard to uniquely define the original mineral for every specimen, there appears to be good evidence for ikaite as the precursor for the majority of the following locality names of pseudomorphs:

- Glendonite, after type locality, Glendon, New South Wales, Australia.
- Thinolite, (Gr. Thinos = shore) found in the tufa of Mono Lake, California, US
- Jarrowite, Jarrow, Northumberland, UK
- Fundylite, Bay of Fundy, Nova Scotia, Canada
- Gersternkorner, (Ger. = Barleycorn)
- Gennoishi, (Jp. = hammerstones)
- Molekryds, (Dan. = Mole Cross), Mors Island, Jutland, Denmark
- Pseudogaylussite (from semblance to Gaylussite)
- White Sea hornlets, White Sea and Kola peninsula.

Ikaite or its pseudomorphs have been reported as occurring in marine, freshwater, and estuarine environments.

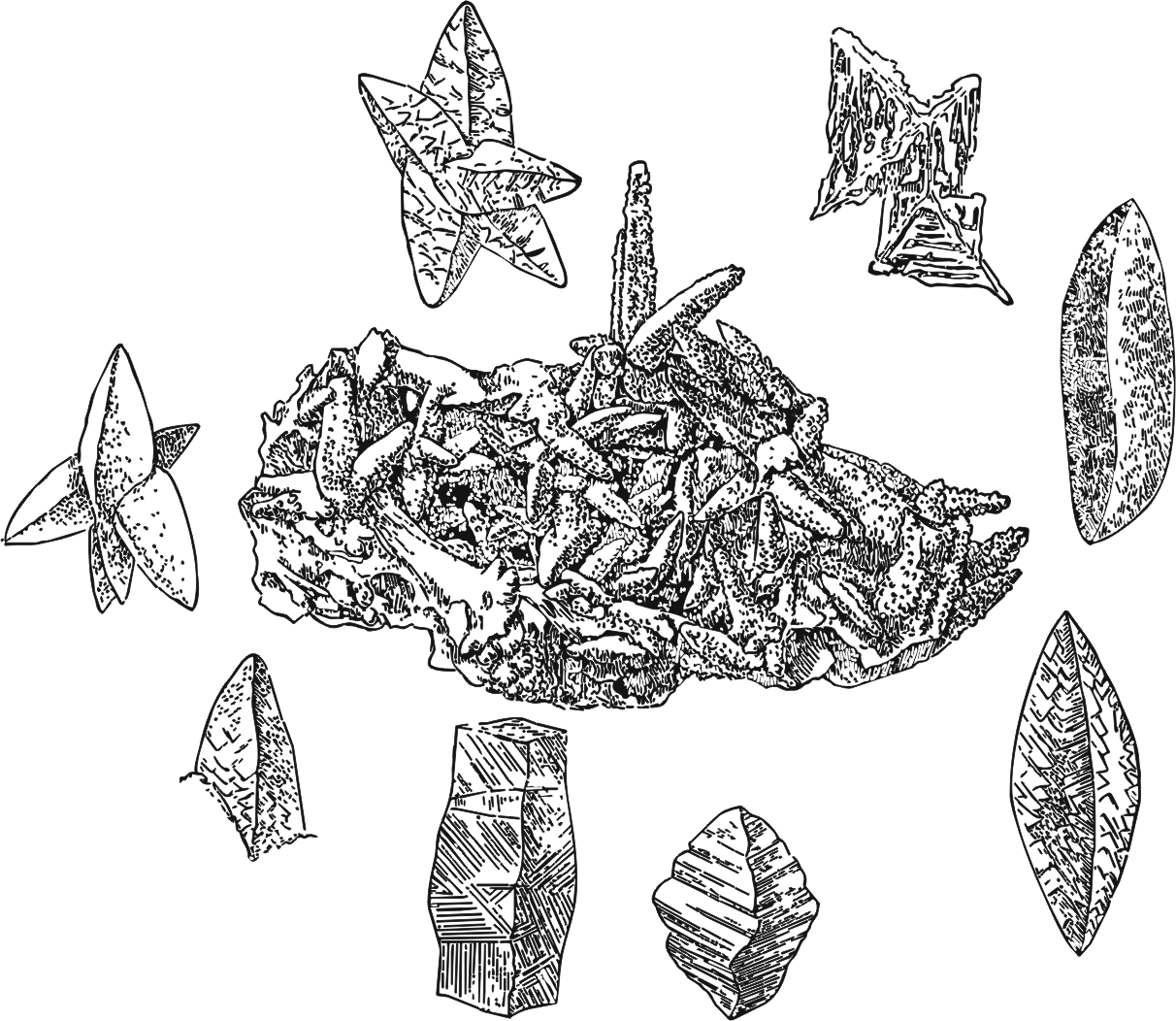
Images of thinolite pseudomorphs taken from ES Dana (1884).

The common ingredient appears to be cold temperatures, although the presence of traces of other chemicals, such as nucleation inhibitors for anhydrous calcium carbonate, may also be required. It has also been reported as forming in winter on Hokkaido at a saline spring.

Since cold water can be found at depth in the oceans, even in the tropics, ikaite can form at all latitudes. However, the presence of ikaite pseudomorphs can be used as a paleoclimate proxy or paleothermometry representing water near freezing conditions.

=== Thinolite deposits ===
Thinolite is an unusual form of calcium carbonate found on the shore (Greek: thinos = shore) of Mono Lake, California. This and other lakes now largely in the desert or semi-desert environments of the southwestern US were part of a larger post-glacial lake that covered much of the region near the end of the last glaciation. It is thought that at this time, conditions similar to that of the Ikka fjord allowed for the growth of massive ikaite.

== Isotope geochemistry ==
Isotope geochemistry can reveal information about the origin of the elements that make up minerals. The isotopic composition of ikaite and the pseudomorphs is actively studied. Studies of the ratio of ^{13}C to ^{12}C in ikaite relative to a natural, standard ratio can help to determine the origin of the carbon pool (organic/inorganic) which was consumed to form ikaite. Some studies have shown that oxidizing methane is the source of both modern-day ikaite and glendonites in high-latitude marine sediments. Similarly, the ratio of ^{18}O to ^{16}O, which varies in nature with temperature and latitude, can be used to show that glendonites were formed in waters very close to the freezing point, in agreement with the observed formation of ikaite.
