= Vaterite =

Calcium carbonate mineral

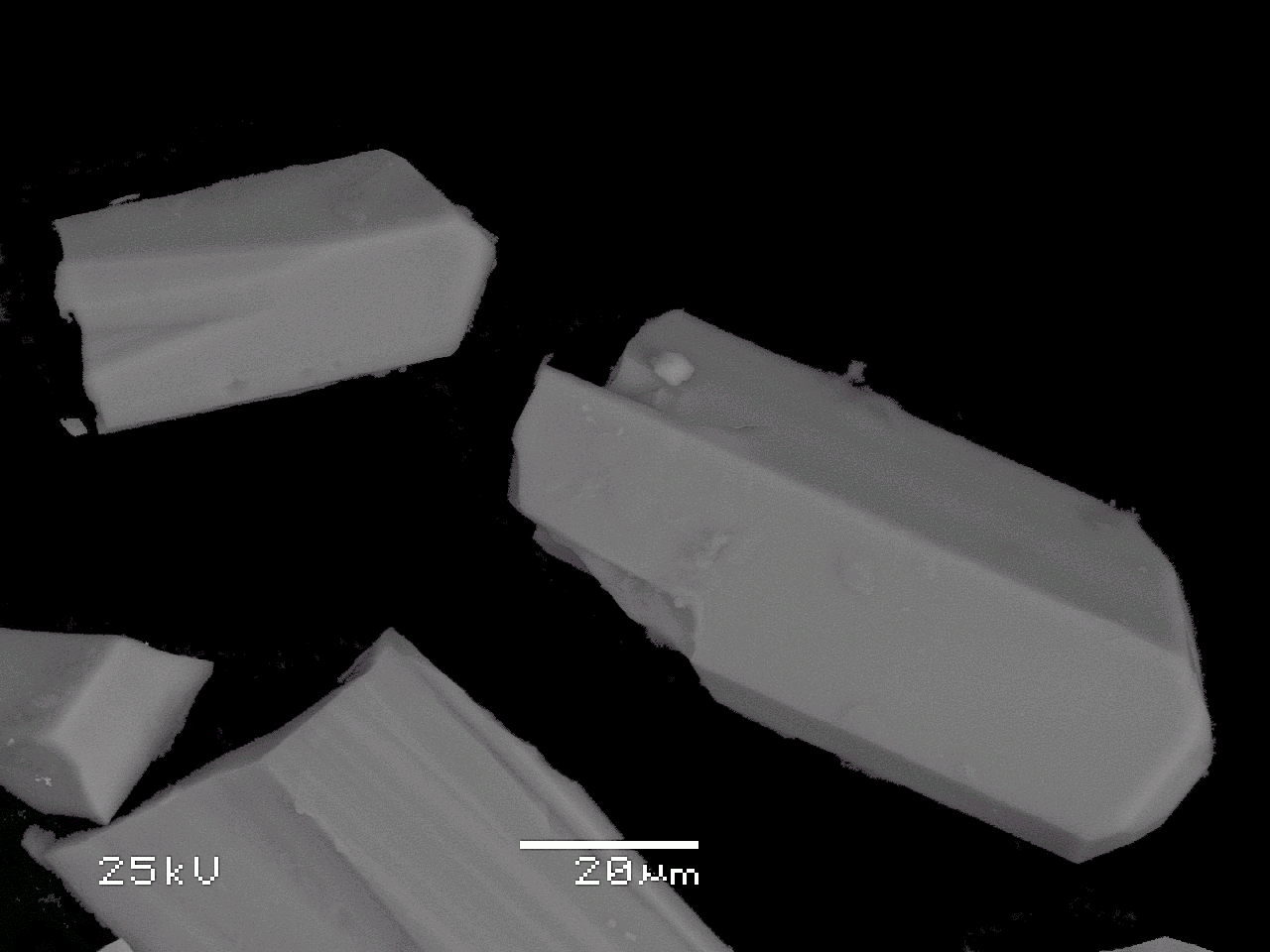
- Vaterite from San Vito quarry, San Vito, Monte Somma, Somma-Vesuvius Complex, Italy

General
- Category: Carbonate minerals
- Formula: CaCO_{3}
- IMA symbol: Vtr
- Strunz classification: 5.AB.20
- Crystal system: Hexagonal
- Crystal class: Dihexagonal dipyramidal (6mmm); H-M symbol: (6/m 2/m 2/m)
- Space group: P6_{3}/mmc {P6_{3}/m 2/m 2/c}
- Unit cell: a = 4.13, c = 8.49 [Å]; Z = 6

Identification
- Color: Colorless
- Crystal habit: Fine fibrous crystals, typically less than 0.1 mm, in spherulitic aggregates.
- Fracture: Irregular to uneven, splintery
- Tenacity: Brittle
- Mohs scale hardness: 3
- Luster: Sub-vitreous, waxy
- Diaphaneity: Transparent to semi-transparent
- Specific gravity: 2.54
- Optical properties: Uniaxial (+)
- Refractive index: n_{ω} = 1.550 n_{ε} = 1.650
- Birefringence: δ = 0.100

Vaterite is a mineral, a polymorph of calcium carbonate (CaCO_{3}). It was named after the German mineralogist Heinrich Vater. It is also known as mu-calcium carbonate (μ-CaCO_{3}). Vaterite belongs to the hexagonal crystal system, whereas calcite is trigonal and aragonite is orthorhombic.

Vaterite, like aragonite, is a metastable phase of calcium carbonate at ambient conditions at the surface of the Earth. As it is less stable than either calcite, the most stable polymorph, or aragonite, vaterite has a higher solubility than either of these phases. Therefore, once vaterite is exposed to water, it converts to calcite (at low temperature) or aragonite (at high temperature: ~60 °C). At 37 °C for example a solution-mediated transition from vaterite to calcite occurs, where the vaterite dissolves and subsequently precipitates as calcite assisted by an Ostwald ripening process.

However, vaterite does occur naturally in mineral springs, organic tissue, gallstones, urinary calculi and plants. In those circumstances, some impurities (metal ions or organic matter) may stabilize the vaterite and prevent its transformation into calcite or aragonite. Vaterite is usually colorless.

Vaterite can be produced as the first mineral deposits repairing natural or experimentally-induced shell damage in some aragonite-shelled mollusks (e.g. gastropods). Subsequent shell deposition occurs as aragonite. In 2018, vaterite was identified as a constituent of a deposit formed on the leaves of Saxifraga at Cambridge University Botanic Garden.

Vaterite is tapped as an effective intermediate form of cement whose production consumes carbon dioxide rather than emitting it. Research into the vaterite production process was inspired by its discovery in the hard skeletons of coral.

Vaterite has a JCPDS number of 13-192.

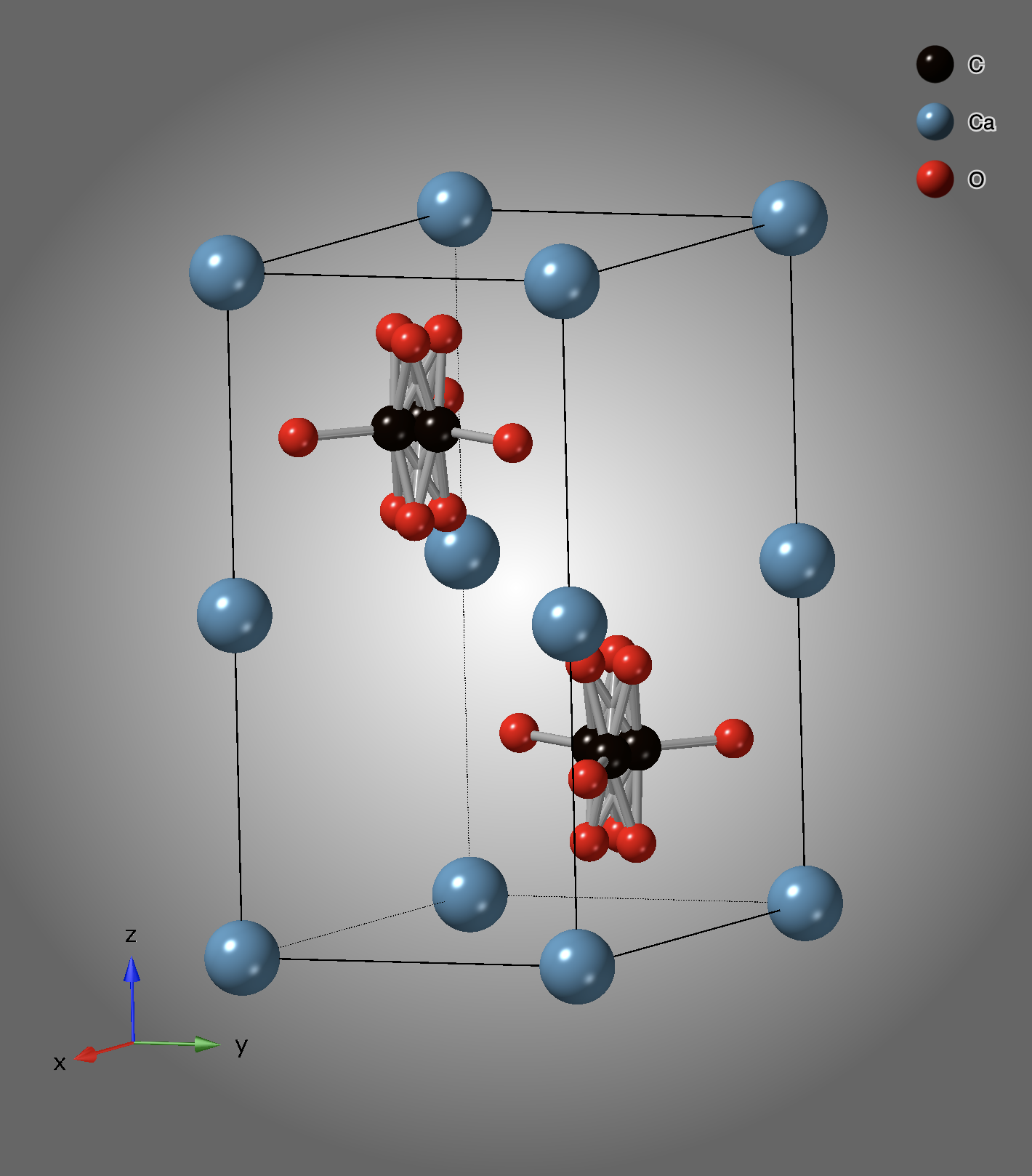
Crystal structure of vaterite

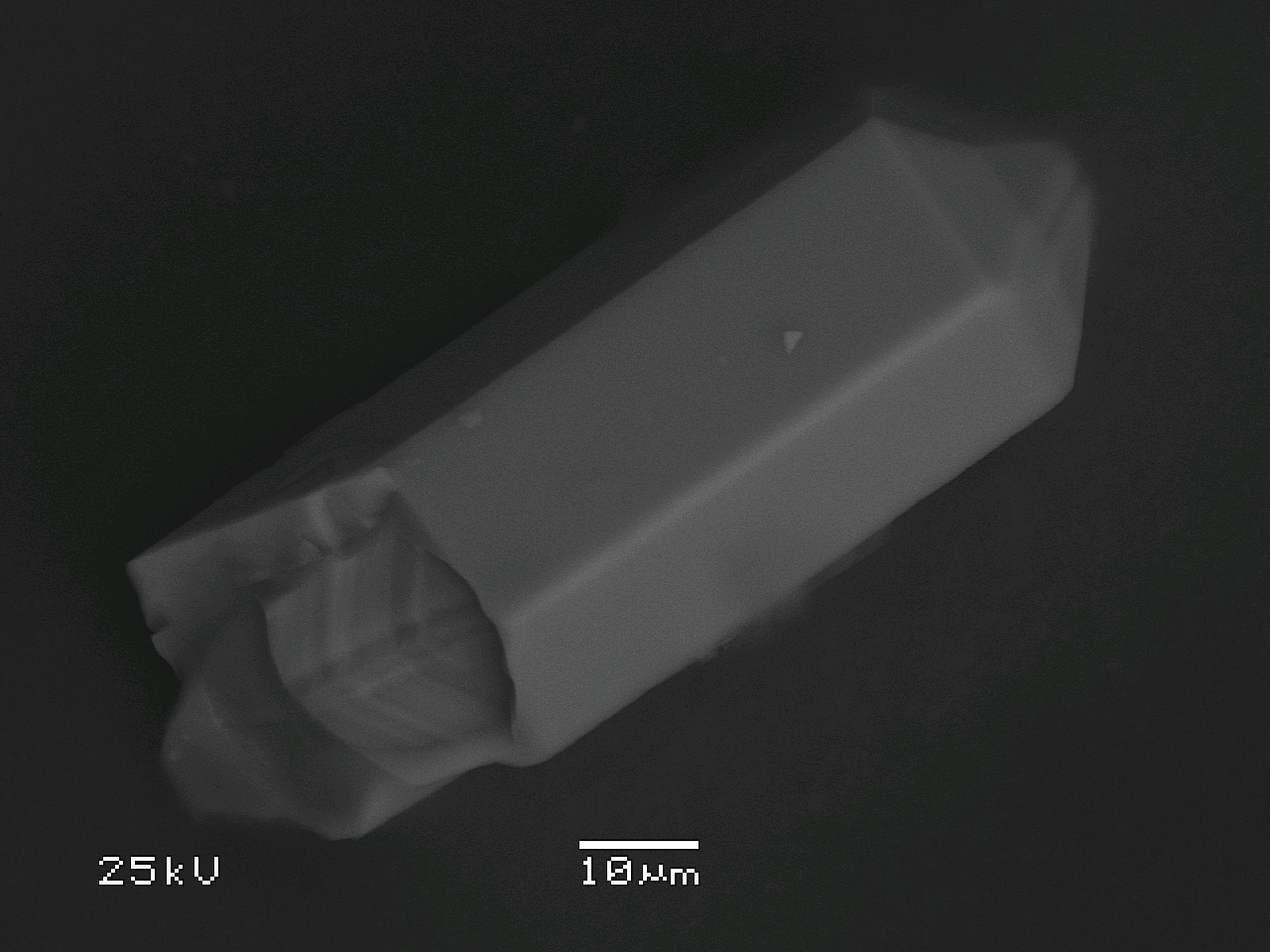
Vaterites of the locality San Vito (Monte Somma, Italy) are microcrystalline with largest crystals below 2 mm size. This vaterite is epitactic after aragonite. The crystal contains triplet of aragonite inside it. On its termination twin seams of aragonite triplet are well visible.

== See also ==
- Monohydrocalcite, CaCO_{3}·H_{2}O
- Ikaite, CaCO_{3}·6H_{2}O
- List of minerals
- List of minerals named after people
