= Uranyl carbonate =

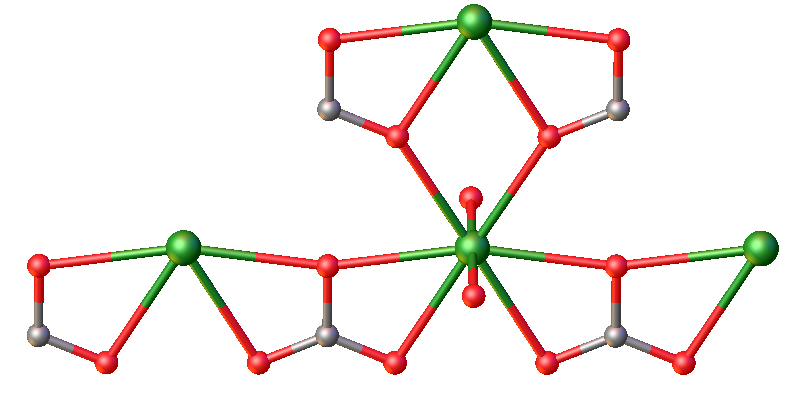
- Uranyl carbonate

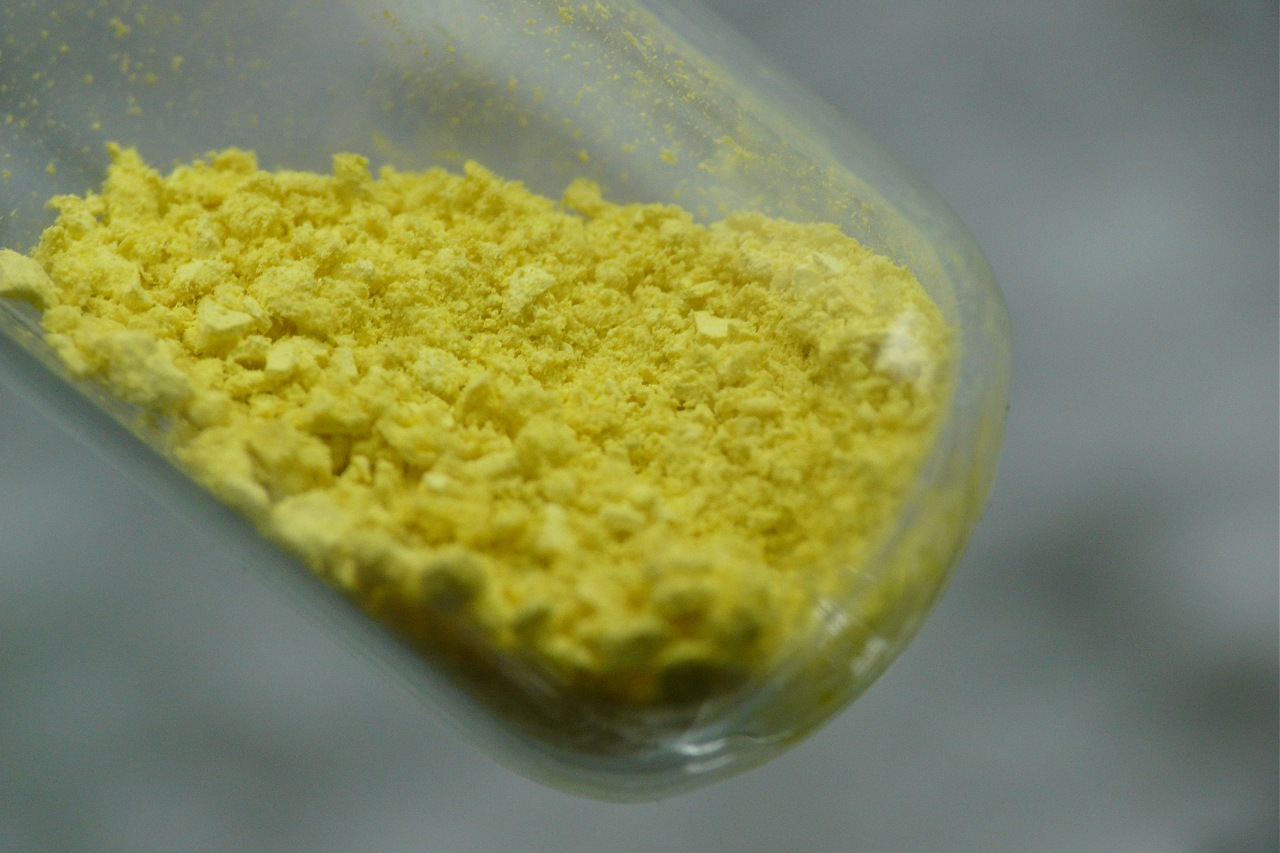
- Uranyl carbonate

Names
- IUPAC name Uranium carbonate
- Other names Uranium Carbonate

Identifiers
CAS Number	12274-95-2; 13021-32-4
3D model (JSmol)	Interactive image
ChemSpider	14272213
PubChem CID	18364468
- InChI: InChI=1S/CH2O3.2O.U/c2-1(3)4;;;/h(H2,2,3,4);;;/q;;;+2/p-2 Key: PPSNDTCGUJZXMQ-UHFFFAOYSA-L
- SMILES: C(=O)([O-])[O-].O=[U+2]=O

Properties
Chemical formula	UO_{2}(CO_{3})
Molar mass	330 g/mol
Density	5.7 g/cm^{3}
- Except where otherwise noted, data are given for materials in their standard state (at 25 °C [77 °F], 100 kPa). verify (what is ?) Infobox references

Uranyl carbonate refers to the inorganic compound with the formula UO_{2}CO_{3}. Also known by its mineral name rutherfordine, this material consists of uranyl (UO^{2+}_{2}) and carbonate (CO^{2−}_{3}). Like most uranyl salts, the compound is a polymeric, each uranium(VI) center being bonded to eight oxygen atoms. Hydrolysis products of rutherfordine are also found in both the mineral and organic fractions of coal, and its fly ash and is the main component of uranium in mine tailing seepage water.

== Uranyl carbonates as a class of materials ==
Many uranyl carbonates exist, rutherfordine being the simplest stoichiometry. Most uranyl carbonates contain additional components including water and diverse anions and cations.

A common method for concentrating uranium from a solution uses solutions of uranyl carbonates, which are passed through a resin bed where the complex ions are transferred to the resin by ion exchange with a negative ion like chloride. After build-up of the uranium complex on the resin, the uranium is eluted with a salt solution and the uranium is precipitated in another process.

== Uranyl carbonate minerals ==
Uranyl carbonates include:

- Andersonite (hydrated sodium calcium uranyl carbonate)
- Astrocyanite-(Ce) (hydrated copper cerium neodymium lanthanum praseodymium samarium calcium yttrium uranyl carbonate hydroxide)
- Bayleyite (hydrated magnesium uranyl carbonate)
- Bijvoetite-(Y) (hydrated yttrium dysprosium uranyl carbonate hydroxide)
- Fontanite (hydrated calcium uranyl carbonate)
- Grimselite (hydrated potassium sodium uranyl carbonate)
- Joliotite (hydrated uranyl carbonate)
- Liebigite (hydrated calcium uranyl carbonate)
- Mckelveyite-(Y) (hydrated barium sodium calcium uranium yttrium carbonate)
- Metazellerite (hydrated calcium uranyl carbonate)
- Rabbittite (hydrated calcium magnesium uranyl carbonate hydroxide)
- Roubaultite (copper uranyl carbonate oxide hydroxide)
- Rutherfordine (uranyl carbonate)
- Schröckingerite (hydrated sodium calcium uranyl sulfate carbonate fluoride)
- Shabaite (hydrated copper cerium neodymium lanthanum praseodymium samarium calcium yttrium uranyl carbonate hydroxide)
- Sharpite (hydrated calcium uranyl carbonate hydroxide)
- Swartzite (hydrated calcium magnesium uranyl carbonate)
- Voglite (hydrated calcium copper uranyl carbonate)
- Wyartite (hydrated calcium uranyl carbonate hydroxide)
- Widenmannite (lead uranyl carbonate)
- Zellerite (hydrated calcium uranyl carbonate)
- Znucalite (hydrated calcium zinc uranyl carbonate hydroxide)
