= Widgiemoolthalite =

Carbonate mineral

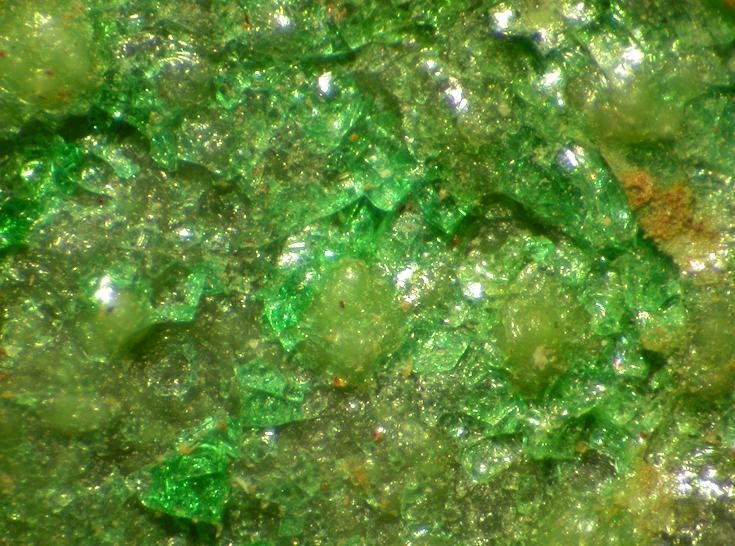
- Widgiemoolthalite (bright green) intermingled with gaspéite (yellow-green). Field of view is three millimeters (0.12 in).

General
- Category: Carbonate minerals
- Formula: (Ni,Mg)_{5}(CO_{3})_{4}(OH)_{2}·5H_{2}O
- IMA symbol: Wmo
- Strunz classification: 5.DA.05
- Dana classification: 16b.7.1.2
- Crystal system: Monoclinic
- Crystal class: Prismatic (2/m) (same H-M symbol)
- Space group: P2_{1}/c
- Unit cell: a = 10.06, b = 8.75 c = 8.32 [Å]; β = 114.3°, Z = 2

Identification
- Color: Bluish-green, grass-green
- Crystal habit: Fibrous, rarely massive, pseudo-orthorhombic
- Tenacity: Brittle
- Mohs scale hardness: 3.5
- Luster: Silky
- Streak: Pale bluish-green
- Diaphaneity: Transparent
- Specific gravity: 3.13 (observed); 3.24 (calculated)
- Optical properties: Biaxial (+)
- Refractive index: n_{ω} = 1.630 n_{ε} = 1.640
- Birefringence: 0.010
- Pleochroism: None
- 2V angle: High
- Length fast/slow: Fast

Widgiemoolthalite is a rare hydrated nickel(II) carbonate mineral with the chemical formula (Ni,Mg)_{5}(CO_{3})_{4}(OH)_{2}·5H_{2}O. Usually bluish-green in color, it is a brittle mineral formed during the weathering of nickel sulfide. Present on gaspéite surfaces, widgiemoolthalite has a Mohs scale hardness of 3.5 and an unknown though likely disordered crystal structure. Widgiemoolthalite was first discovered in 1992 in Widgiemooltha, Western Australia, which is to date its only known source. It was named the following year by the three researchers who first reported its existence, Ernest H. Nickel, Bruce W. Robinson, and William G. Mumme.

== Origins ==
One consequence of the 1966 discovery of nickel deposits in Western Australia and subsequent nickel mining boom was the discovery of novel secondary mineral species in mined regions beginning in the mid-1970s. Widgiemoolthalite was first found at 132 North, a nickel deposit near Widgiemooltha, Western Australia, controlled by the Western Mining Corporation. Blair J. Gartrell collected the holotype widgiemoolthalite specimen from a stockpile of secondary minerals at the site. The mineral was discovered in 1992 and was first reported in American Mineralogist in 1993 by Ernest H. Nickel, Bruce W. Robinson, and William G. Mumme, when it received its name for its type locality. Widgiemoolthalite's existence was confirmed and name was approved by the Commission on New Minerals and Mineral Names of the International Mineralogical Association the same year. The holotype specimen was stored in Perth's Western Australian Museum. In 2021, widgiemoolthalite was assigned the IMA symbol Wmo.

== Occurrence ==
Widgiemoolthalite occurs as a secondary mineral. It is found overlaying nickel sulfide that has undergone weathering, often in hollow spaces on gaspéite surfaces, and often exhibiting fibrous and rarely massive crystal habits. Other minerals associated with widgiemoolthalite include annabergite, carrboydite, dolomite, glaukosphaerite, hydrohonessite, kambaldaite, magnesite, nepouite, nullaginite, olivenite, otwayite, paratacamite, pecoraite, reevesite, retgersite, and takovite. Two additional unnamed minerals were also reported as associated secondary minerals from the 132 North site, the only locality at which widgiemoolthalite has been found. The 132 North waste pile from which widgiemoolthalite was first recovered is no longer in existence, making it a rare mineral. In support of the designation of an Anthropocene epoch, the existence and provenance of widgiemoolthalite, along with 207 other mineral species, have been cited as evidence of uniquely human action upon global stratigraphy.

== Structure ==
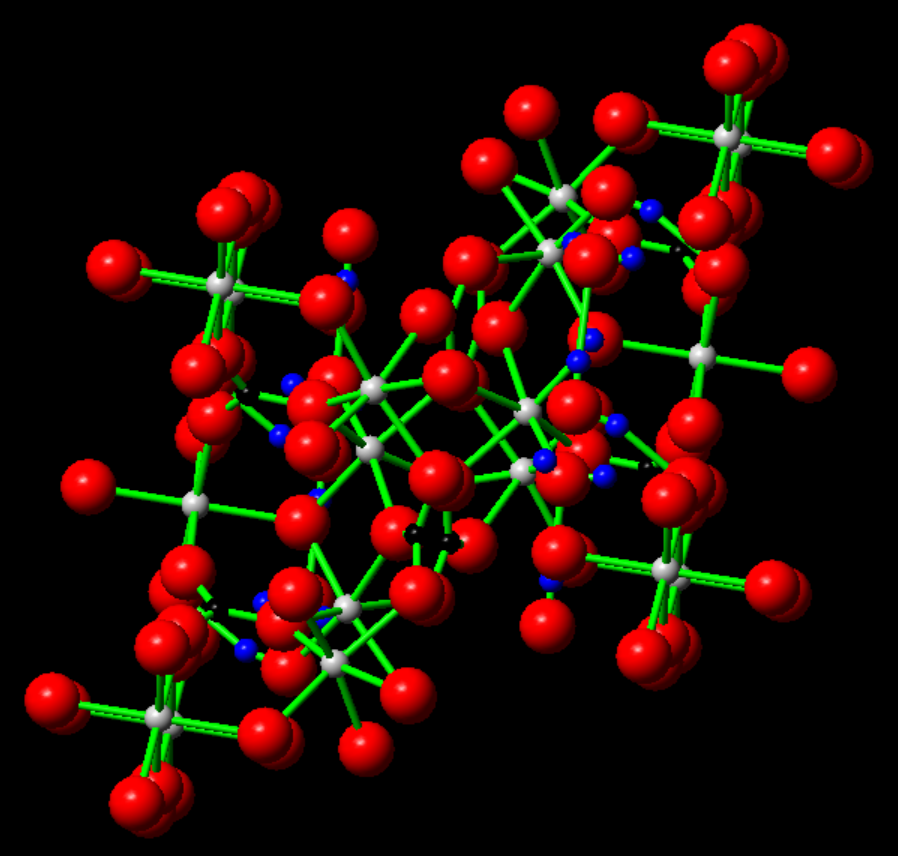
A ball-and-stick model of a possible widgiemoolthalite crystal structure, adapted from the atomic parameters of its structural analog hydromagnesite as reported by Akao and Iwai modified with measurements by Nickel et al. The model is viewed down the b axis. Gray atoms are nickel, black are carbon, red are oxygen, and blue are hydrogen.

Widgiemoolthalite is a nickel(II) carbonate that has undergone mineral hydration. Tests by Nickel, Robinson, and Mumme yielded the chemical formula (Ni,Mg)_{5.00}(CO_{3})_{4.15}-(OH)_{1.70}·5.12H_{2}O. The researchers observed that widgiemoolthalite is the nickel structural analog to the hydrated magnesium carbonate hydromagnesite and considering this relationship, determined that widgiemoolthalite's ideal makeup is Ni_{5}(CO_{3})_{4}(OH)_{2}·4-5H_{2}O though because it may contain either nickel or magnesium, widgiemoolthalite's makeup may also be written (Ni,Mg)_{5}(CO_{3})_{4}(OH)_{2}·5H_{2}O. By weight, the mineral is 49.58% oxygen, 34.41% nickel, 8.05% carbon, 6.11% magnesium, and 1.86% hydrogen. As of 2016, the exact crystal structure of widgiemoolthalite was not known though based on the patterns produced when the mineral was analyzed with X-ray crystallography, a high degree of structural disorder was suspected. Under an optical microscope, Nickel, Robinson, and Mumme reported difficulty discerning individual crystals as their lateral dimensions were too small.

Crystals of widgiemoolthalite conform to a monoclinic system of symmetry, occupying space group P2_{1}/c. A unit cell of the mineral, the smallest divisible unit that possesses the same symmetry and properties, is packed with twice the atoms of its formula unit and has the dimensions a = 10.06(17), b = 8.75(5), and c = 8.32(4) Å. Each unit cell of widgiemoolthalite has a β value of 114.3(8)° and an approximate volume of 667.48 Å^{3}.

== Characteristics ==
Hand specimens of widgiemoolthalite tend to be bluish-green though may also be grass-green in rare cases. Widgiemoolthalite is transparent in hand sample with a silky luster and a pale bluish-green streak. The mineral is brittle and breaks along its fiber contacts. Its observed specific gravity is 3.13(1) while its calculated specific gravity is 3.24, with a hardness of 3.5 on the Mohs scale.

When viewed with polarized light under a petrographic microscope, widgiemoolthalite appears bluish-green and does not exhibit pleochroism. It is biaxial positive and has a high optic angle (or 2V). When measured perpendicular and parallel to its axis of anisotropy, its refractive indices are 1.630 and 1.640 respectively. This gives it a birefringence of 0.010.
