= Carbonate mineral =

Minerals containing the carbonate ion

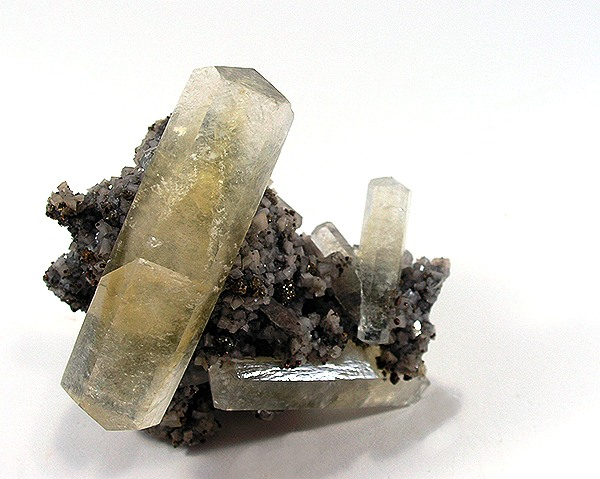
Calcite crystals from the Sweetwater Mine, Viburnum Trend District, Reynolds County, Missouri; 6.2 × 6 × 3.3 cm

Carbonate minerals are those minerals containing the carbonate ion, CO^{2−}_{3}.

== Carbonate divisions ==
=== Anhydrous carbonates ===
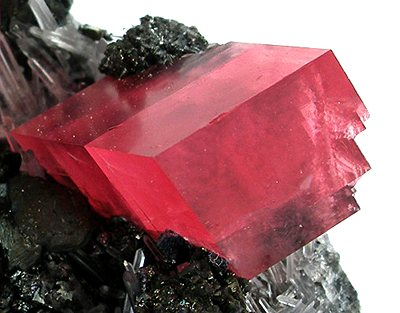
Rhodochrosite, Sweet Home Mine, Alma, Colorado; 5.2 × 4.2 × 2.3 cm

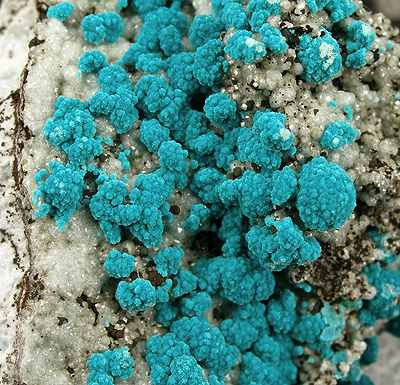
Smithsonite, Silver Bill Mine, Dragoon Mts, Cochise County, Arizona; 4.8 × 4.1 × 2.4 cm

- Calcite group: trigonal
  - Calcite CaCO_{3}
  - Gaspéite (Ni,Mg,Fe^{2+})CO_{3}
  - Magnesite MgCO_{3}
  - Otavite CdCO_{3}
  - Rhodochrosite MnCO_{3}
  - Siderite FeCO_{3}
  - Smithsonite ZnCO_{3}
  - Spherocobaltite CoCO_{3}
- Aragonite group: orthorhombic
  - Aragonite CaCO_{3}
  - Cerussite PbCO_{3}
  - Strontianite SrCO_{3}
  - Witherite BaCO_{3}
  - Rutherfordine UO_{2}CO_{3}
  - Natrite Na_{2}CO_{3}

=== Anhydrous carbonates with compound formulas ===
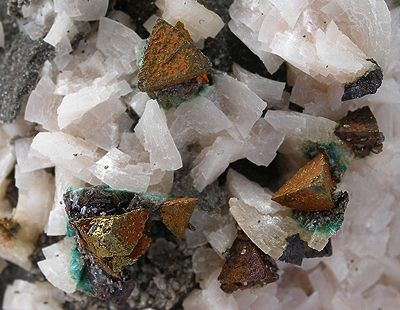
Dolomite with calcite and chalcopyrite from the Picher Field, Tri-State district, Cherokee County, Kansas; 12.0 × 9.7 × 4.3 cm

- Dolomite group: trigonal
  - Ankerite CaFe(CO_{3})_{2}
  - Dolomite CaMg(CO_{3})_{2}
  - Huntite Mg_{3}Ca(CO_{3})_{4}
  - Minrecordite CaZn(CO_{3})_{2}
  - Barytocalcite BaCa(CO_{3})_{2}

=== Carbonates with hydroxyl or halogen ===
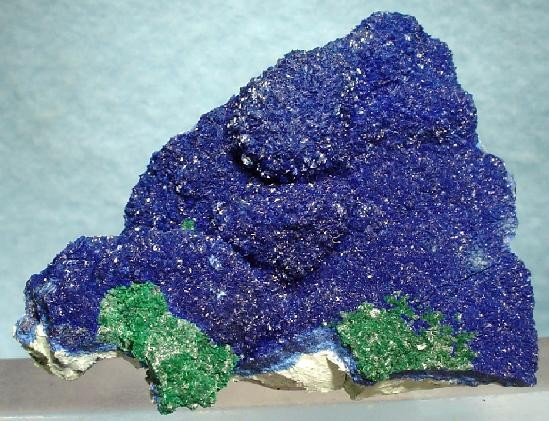
Azurite and malachite, Beaver Dam Mts, Washington County, Utah; 5.1 × 3.9 × 2.4 cm

- Carbonate with hydroxide: monoclinic
  - Azurite Cu_{3}(CO_{3})_{2}(OH)_{2}
  - Hydrocerussite Pb_{3}(CO_{3})_{2}(OH)_{2}
  - Malachite Cu_{2}CO_{3}(OH)_{2}
  - Rosasite (Cu,Zn)_{2}CO_{3}(OH)_{2}
  - Phosgenite Pb_{2}(CO_{3})Cl_{2}
  - Hydrozincite Zn_{5}(CO_{3})_{2}(OH)_{6}
  - Aurichalcite (Zn,Cu)_{5}(CO_{3})_{2}(OH)_{6}

=== Hydrated carbonates ===
- Hydromagnesite Mg_{5}(CO_{3})_{4}(OH)_{2}.4H_{2}O
- Ikaite CaCO_{3}·6(H_{2}O)
- Lansfordite MgCO_{3}·5(H_{2}O)
- Monohydrocalcite CaCO_{3}·H_{2}O
- Natron Na_{2}CO_{3}·10(H_{2}O)
- Zellerite Ca(UO_{2})(CO_{3})_{2}·5(H_{2}O)

The carbonate class in both the Dana and the Strunz classification systems include the nitrates.

== Nickel–Strunz classification -05- carbonates ==
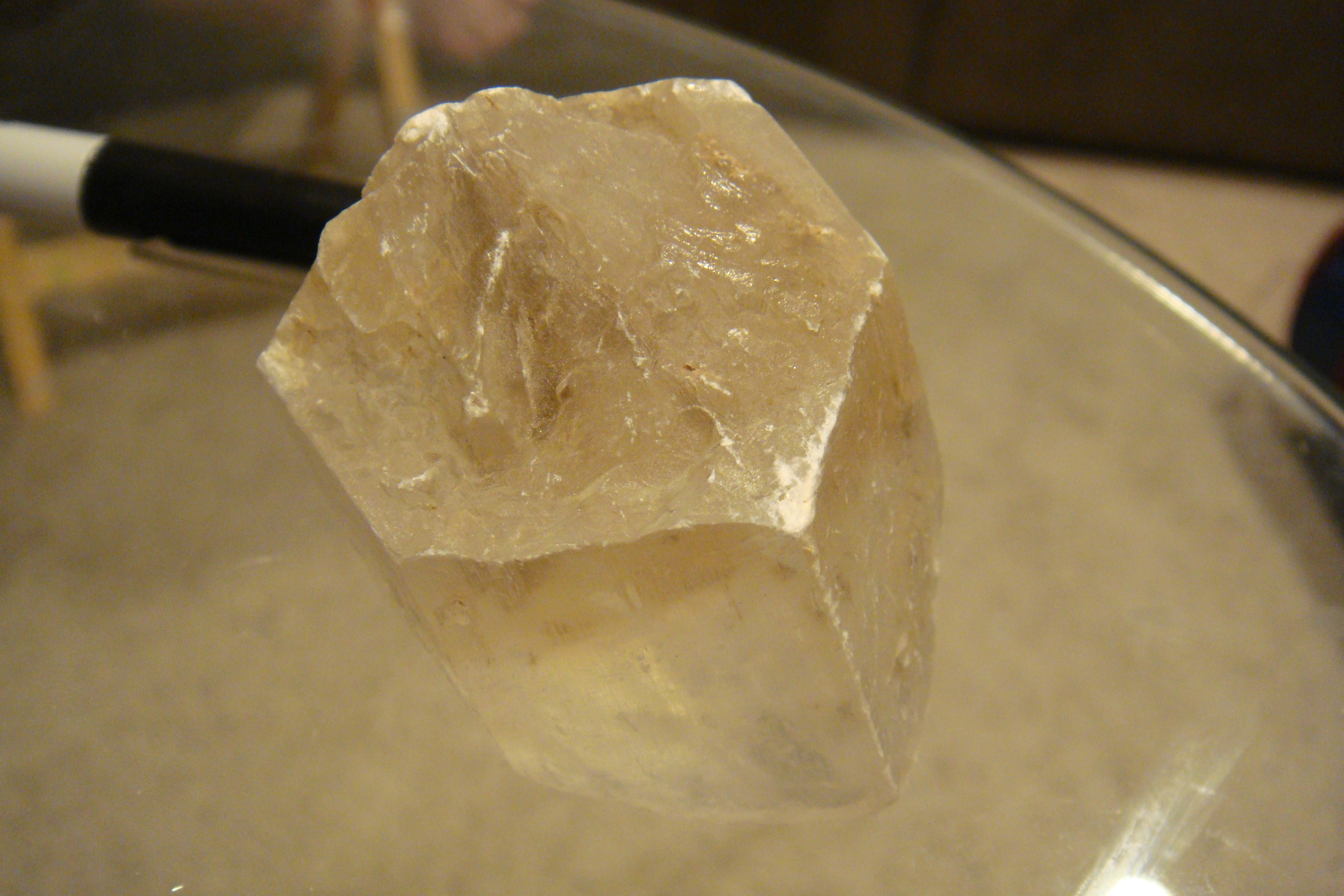
Hanksite, Na_{22}K(SO_{4})_{9}(CO_{3})_{2}Cl, one of the few minerals that is considered a carbonate and a sulfate

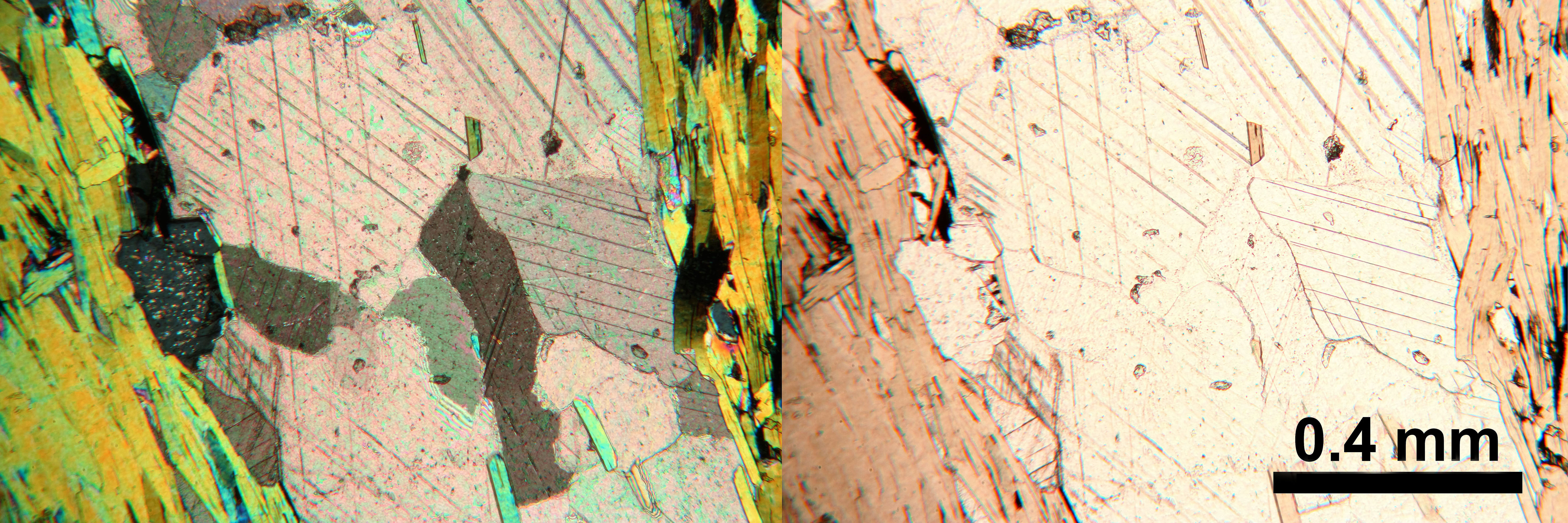
Photomicrographs of a thin section containing carbonate vein in mica rich rock. In cross-polarized light on left, plane-polarized light on right.

IMA-CNMNC proposes a new hierarchical scheme (Mills et al., 2009). This list uses the classification of Nickel–Strunz (mindat.org, 10 ed, pending publication).

- Abbreviations:
  - "*" – discredited (IMA/CNMNC status).
  - "?" – questionable/doubtful (IMA/CNMNC status).
  - "REE" – Rare-earth element (Sc, Y, La, Ce, Pr, Nd, Pm, Sm, Eu, Gd, Tb, Dy, Ho, Er, Tm, Yb, Lu)
  - "PGE" – Platinum-group element (Ru, Rh, Pd, Os, Ir, Pt)
  - 03.C Aluminofluorides, 06 Borates, 08 Vanadates (04.H V^{[5,6]} Vanadates), 09 Silicates:
    - Neso: insular (from Greek νησος nēsos, island)
    - Soro: grouping (from Greek σωροῦ sōros, heap, mound (especially of corn))
    - Cyclo: ring
    - Ino: chain (from Greek ις [genitive: ινος inos], fibre)
    - Phyllo: sheet (from Greek φύλλον phyllon, leaf)
    - Tekto: three-dimensional framework
- Nickel–Strunz code scheme: NN.XY.##x
  - NN: Nickel–Strunz mineral class number
  - X: Nickel–Strunz mineral division letter
  - Y: Nickel–Strunz mineral family letter
  - ##x: Nickel–Strunz mineral/group number, x add-on letter

=== Class: carbonates ===
- 05.A Carbonates without additional anions, without H_{2}O
  - 05.AA Alkali carbonates: 05 Zabuyelite; 10 Gregoryite, 10 Natrite; 15 Nahcolite, 20 Kalicinite, 25 Teschemacherite, 30 Wegscheiderite
  - 05.AB Alkali-earth (and other M^{2+}) carbonates: 05 Calcite, 05 Gaspeite, 05 Magnesite, 05 Rhodochrosite, 05 Otavite, 05 Spherocobaltite, 05 Siderite, 05 Smithsonite; 10 Ankerite, 10 Dolomite, 10 Kutnohorite, 10 Minrecordite; 15 Cerussite, 15 Aragonite, 15 Strontianite, 15 Witherite; 20 Vaterite, 25 Huntite, 30 Norsethite, 35 Alstonite; 40 Olekminskite, 40 Paralstonite; 45 Barytocalcite, 50 Carbocernaite, 55 Benstonite, 60 Juangodoyite
  - 05.AC Alkali and alkali-earth carbonates: 05 Eitelite, 10 Nyerereite, 10 Natrofairchildite, 10 Zemkorite; 15 Butschliite, 20 Fairchildite, 25 Shortite; 30 Sanromanite, 30 Burbankite, 30 Calcioburbankite, 30 Khanneshite
  - 05.AD With rare-earth elements (REE): 05 Sahamalite-(Ce); 15 Rémondite-(Ce), 15 Petersenite-(Ce), 15 Rémondite-(La); 20 Paratooite-(La)
- 05.B Carbonates with additional anions, without H_{2}O
  - 05.BA With Cu, Co, Ni, Zn, Mg, Mn: 05 Azurite, 10 Chukanovite, 10 Malachite, 10 Georgeite, 10 Pokrovskite, 10 Nullaginite, 10 Glaukosphaerite, 10 Mcguinnessite, 10 Kolwezite, 10 Rosasite, 10 Zincrosasite; 15 Aurichalcite, 15 Hydrozincite; 20 Holdawayite, 25 Defernite; 30 Loseyite, 30 Sclarite
  - 05.BB With alkalies, etc.: 05 Barentsite, 10 Dawsonite, 15 Tunisite, 20 Sabinaite
  - 05.BC With alkali-earth cations: 05 Brenkite, 10 Rouvilleite, 15 Podlesnoite
  - 05.BD With rare-earth elements (REE): 05 Cordylite-(Ce), 05 Lukechangite-(Ce); 10 Kukharenkoite-(La), 10 Kukharenkoite-(Ce), 10 Zhonghuacerite-(Ce); 15 Cebaite-(Nd), 15 Cebaite-(Ce); 20a Bastnasite-(Ce), 20a Bastnasite-(La), 20a Bastnasite-(Y), 20a Hydroxylbastnasite-(Ce), 20a Hydroxylbastnasite-(La), 20a Hydroxylbastnasite-(Nd), 20a Thorbastnasite, 20b Parisite-(Nd), 20b Parisite-(Ce), 20c Synchysite-(Ce), 20c Synchysite-(Nd), 20c Synchysite-(Y), 20d Rontgenite-(Ce); 25 Horvathite-(Y), 30 Qaqarssukite-(Ce), 35 Huanghoite-(Ce)
  - 05.BE With Pb, Bi: 05 Shannonite, 10 Hydrocerussite, 15 Plumbonacrite, 20 Phosgenite, 25 Bismutite, 30 Kettnerite, 35 Beyerite
  - 05.BF With (Cl), SO_{4}, PO_{4}, TeO_{3}: 05 Northupite, 05 Ferrotychite, 05 Manganotychite, 05 Tychite; 10 Bonshtedtite, 10 Crawfordite, 10 Bradleyitev, 10 Sidorenkite, 15 Daqingshanite-(Ce), 20 Reederite-(Y), 25 Mineevite-(Y), 30 Brianyoungite, 35 Philolithite; 40 Macphersonitev, 40 Susannite, 40 Leadhillite
- 05.C Carbonates without additional anions, with H_{2}O
  - 05.CA With medium-sized cations: 05 Nesquehonite, 10 Lansfordite, 15 Barringtonite, 20 Hellyerite
  - 05.CB With large cations (alkali and alkali-earth carbonates): 05 Thermonatrite, 10 Natron, 15 Trona, 20 Monohydrocalcite, 25 Ikaite, 30 Pirssonite, 35 Gaylussite, 40 Chalconatronite, 45 Baylissite, 50 Tuliokite
  - 05.CC With rare-earth elements (REE): 05 Donnayite-(Y), 05 Mckelveyite-(Nd)*, 05 Mckelveyite-(Y), 05 Weloganite; 10 Tengerite-(Y), 15 Lokkaite-(Y); 20 Shomiokite-(Y), 20 IMA2008-069; 25 Calkinsite-(Ce), 25 Lanthanite-(Ce), 25 Lanthanite-(La), 25 Lanthanite-(Nd); 30 Adamsite-(Y), 35 Decrespignyite-(Y), 40 Galgenbergite-(Ce), 45 Ewaldite, 50 Kimuraite-(Y)
- 05.D Carbonates with additional anions, with H_{2}O
  - 05.DA With medium-sized cations: 05 Dypingite, 05 Giorgiosite, 05 Hydromagnesite, 05 Widgiemoolthalite; 10 Artinite, 10 Chlorartinite; 15 Otwayite, 20 Kambaldaite, 25 Callaghanite, 30 Claraite; 35 Hydroscarbroite, 35 Scarbroite; 40 Charmarite-3T, 40 Charmarite-2H, 40 Caresite, 40 Quintinite-2H, 40 Quintinite-3T; 45 Brugnatellite, 45 Barbertonite, 45 Chlormagaluminite, 45 Zaccagnaite, 45 Manasseite, 45 Sjogrenite; 50 Desautelsite, 50 Comblainite, 50 Hydrotalcite, 50 Pyroaurite, 50 Reevesite, 50 Stichtite, 50 Takovite; 55 Coalingite, 60 Karchevskyite, 65 Indigirite, 70 Zaratite
  - 05.DB With large and medium-sized cations: 05 Alumohydrocalcite, 05 Para-alumohydrocalcite, 05 Nasledovite; 10 Dresserite, 10 Dundasite, 10 Strontiodresserite, 10 Petterdite, 10 Kochsandorite; 15 Hydrodresserite, 20 Schuilingite-(Nd), 25 Sergeevite, 30 Szymanskiite, 35 Montroyalite
  - 05.DC With large cations: 05 Ancylite-(Ce), 05 Ancylite-(La), 05 Gysinite-(Nd), 05 Calcioancylite-(Ce), 05 Calcioancylite-(Nd), 05 Kozoite-(La), 05 Kozoite-(Nd); 10 Kamphaugite-(Y), 15 Sheldrickite, 20 Thomasclarkite-(Y), 25 Peterbaylissite, 30 Clearcreekite, 35 Niveolanite
- 05.E Uranyl carbonates
  - 05.EA UO_{2}:CO_{3} > 1:1: 10 Urancalcarite, 15 Wyartite, 20 Oswaldpeetersite, 25 Roubaultite, 30 Kamotoite-(Y), 35 Sharpite
  - 05.EB UO_{2}:CO_{3} = 1:1: 05 Rutherfordine, 10 Blatonite, 15 Joliotite, 20 Bijvoetite-(Y)
  - 05.EC UO_{2}:CO_{3} < 1:1 - 1:2: 05 Fontanite; 10 Metazellerite, 10 Zellerite
  - 05.ED UO_{2}:CO_{3} = 1:3: 05 Bayleyite, 10 Swartzite, 15 Albrechtschraufite, 20 Liebigite, 25 Rabbittite, 30 Andersonite, 35 Grimselite, 40 Widenmannite, 45 Znucalite, 50 Cejkaite
  - 05.EE UO_{2}:CO_{3} = 1:4: 05 Voglite, 10 Shabaite-(Nd)
  - 05.EF UO_{2}:CO_{3} = 1:5: 05 Astrocyanite-(Ce)
  - 05.EG With SO_{4} or SiO_{4}: 05 Schrockingerite, 10 Lepersonnite-(Gd)
