= Widgiemooltha Komatiite =

Geologic formation in the Goldfields of Western Australia

The Widgiemooltha Komatiite is a formation of komatiite in the Yilgarn craton of Western Australia.

== Stratigraphy ==
The stratigraphy of the Widgiemooltha Komatiite is well known to be part of the regional komatiite magmatic event also seen at the Kambalda Dome, 50 kilometres (31 mi) to the north. There are comparisons which place the Widgiemooltha Komatiite as equivalent to the Silver Lake Komatiite. The Mt Edwards Basalt is correlated regionally with the Devon Consuls Basalt of Kambalda, and the Widgeimooltha Chert correlated with the Paringa Slate.

The structure of the Widgiemooltha Dome has three thrusted repetitions of the basal komatiite contact and komatiite sequence including footwall Mt Edwards Basalt and hangingwall sediments (Widgiemooltha Chert).

=== Widgiemooltha Dome ===
The Widgiemooltha Komatiite is exposed around the margins of a large, 450 square kilometres (174 sq mi) granite dome. The Widgiemooltha Granite is a coarse to medium, holocrystalline equigranular granite with subordinate biotite and ferromagnesian minerals. It is mildly deformed, and is considered to have intruded concurrently with doming and uplift during late deformation. It is intrusive into the thrust repeated stratigraphy of the Widgiemooltha Komatiite and its sequence.

=== Lake Zot Dolerite ===
The Lake Zot Dolerite is similar to the Defiance Dolerite and other regionally important subvolcanic doleritic sill complexes throughout the Yilgarn craton. Within the Widgiemooltha Dome area, the Lake Zot Dolerite can attain greater than 300 metres (984 ft) thickness and is intrusive into the hangingwall basalt and Widgiemooltha Chert above the Widgiemooltha Komatiite.

The dolerite is coarse grained in the main, often equigranular and holocrystalline although porphyritic areas are known and chilled margins and occasional compositional variations are noted. It is often epidotised, carbonated and sodium metasomatised in proximity to major structures. It can often be reasonably strained throughout its bulk and especially in the footwall contact with the Widgiemooltha Komatiite.

=== Widgiemooltha Chert ===
The Widgiemooltha Chert is a deep sea chemical sedimentary unit stratigraphically above the Widgiemooltha Komatiite. It is composed of from less than 1 metre (0 mi) to 40 metres (0 mi) of sulfidic, graphitic and siliceous cherts, often finely laminated and expressing ptygmatic folding post-sedimentation. It is considered to be an exhalative deposit formed post-magmatism. It often is intruded by the Lake Zot Dolerite.

The Widgiemooltha Chert is often the host of regional shears and thrusts.

=== Widgiemooltha Komatiite ===
The Widgiemooltha Komatiite is typically 30 metres (0 mi) to 300 metres (0 mi) in apparent thickness, often with several clearly defined interflow sediment intervals and A1, A2, A3 spinifex textured zones and B2 zone cumulate zones developed rhythmically throughout. Depending on area and volcanic facies, there can be anywhere from greater than 24 individual flow units to as few as three flows within the Widgiemooltha Komatiite.

The komatiite is typically of high magnesian character throughout, although flow top spinifex zones may get to as low as 18% MgO. Highest magnesium contents in rocks occur within the Wannaway area, with magnesium contents of up to 45% MgO reported from adcumulate serpentinite lithologies in the basal flow.

The Widgiemooltha Komatiite is host to no less than 15 individual channelised kambalda type komatiitic nickel ore deposits of which 5 have been mined, the remaining ten being of too low grade and low tenor to be economic at present. These features correlate with thickened komatiitic sequences, thick basal flows, trough like structural features and high magnesium lavas.

=== Mt Edwards Basalt ===
The footwall to the Widgiemooltha Komatiite is the Mt Edwards Basalt, which is a low to medium MgO mafic extrusive rock, metamorphosed to upper greenschist facies. Mineralogy is chlorite, actinolite, rare epidote, quartz and albite. The Mt Edwards Basalt has uncommon interflow sedimentary intervals and some well developed pillow basalt flow tops which give regional facing directions. The true thickness of the Mt Edwards Basalt is unknown.

== Economic importance ==
The Widgiemooltha Komatiite is an important host for Kambalda type komatiitic nickel ore deposits.

Nickel ore has been found at several locations around the Widgiemooltha Dome and has been mined from six locations, with four underground mines in operation as of 2007 and a proposed open cut mine for mid-2007. Further exceptionally high-grade gold mineralisation is present at Wattle Dam, to 6 kg (200 Oz) to the ton, within the Widgiemooltha Komatiite.

=== 132 North ===
From Nickel et al. (1994)
The 132 North deposit was discovered by in 1968 by International Nickel Australia Limited via gossan searching and mined by Western Mining Corporation in 1981, with 900 tons of nickel metal produced. It was a small pod of low-grade nickel sulfide mineralisation hosted in a parasitic isoclinal syncline developed on the 132 Anticline on the northern flank of the Widgiemooltha Dome. The 132 North and Widgiemooltha Townsite nickel gossans are mineralogical laboratories and contain exceptionally rare minerals.

The ore profile of the 132 North deposit is, from base upwards, 0.1 to 1m of massive pentlandite-pyrrhotite-pyrite-chalcopyrite sulfide, matrix sulfide containing 40-80% sulfide, and disseminated sulfide. Accessory nickeline and gersdorffite are reported. The transition zone supergene sulfide phases include; violarite, smythite, covellite, chalcocite and marcasite after pyrite.

The nickel sulfides within the regolith have been oxidised into a complex series of weathering fronts including a rare expression of a carbonate front which has resulted in a host of unusual nickel carbonate, arsenate and silicate minerals such as gaspeite, atacamite, annabergite, carrboydite, glaucospaerite, hydrohonessite, kambaldaite, népouite, nullaginite, pecoraite, olivenite, otwayite, reevesite, retgersite, takovite and of course widgiemoolthalite.

=== Miitel ===
The Miitel nickel mine was first discovered in the early to late 1970s by Union Miniere and Anaconda Resources, though due to poor understanding of the geology the initial intercepts were not sufficiently followed up until the early 1990s by Western Mining Corporation. The Miitel orebody has been successfully extended in size and tonnage from successive exploration efforts, most recently by Mincor Resources NL in 2002-2005, resulting in the "discovery" of the South Miitel extension.

The Miitel nickel mine has produced to date 1.56 million tons at 3.5% Ni for 47,250 tonnes of contained nickel. Reserves as of December 2006 were 481,000 tons @ 3.5% Ni for 16,835 Ni tons in North Miitel and 298,000 tons @ 3.8% Ni for 12,282 nickel tons in South Miitel. The Miitel mine is accessed by a single decline which splits into two separate declines which drive upon the north and south Miitel ore positions. The ore is mined by 'flatbacking', which is a form of cut and fill mining.

The Miitel orebody is situated on the eastern flank of the Widgiemooltha Dome on the Miitel Contact of the Widiemooltha Komatiite, and has the form of an arcuate boomerang which plunges away to the north and south. The Widgiemooltha Komatiie forms a recognisable trough structure which is the idealised form of a komatiitic nickel orebody. Ore is a highly strained massive to matrix olivine-sulfide adcumulate with a fine pyrrhotite-pyrite groundmass and prominent pentlandite porphyroblasts.

The influence of structure on the Miitel orebody is minimal except between the central Miitel and South Miitel ore pods and the current northern extent of the North Miitel ore trend where later, brittle faults disturb and offset the stratigraphy.

The komatiite itself is highly talc carbonateed with a predominance of talc-magnesite-amphibolite assemblages suggesting an original orthocumulate derivation. Accessory minerals in the orebody include nickeline, gersdorffite, millerite, chromite and occasionally other arsenic sulfide minerals.

Consonant with the practise of Western Mining Corporation naming mines after the drillers which first intersected the ore, Miitel is named after driller David Miitel.

=== Mariners ===
The Mariners nickel mine was originally drilled in the 1970s by Union Miniere and Anaconda Resources, with an intercept of 12m @ 0.7% Ni being delivered from a flanking position, which was not sufficiently followed up. Mariners was then left until the late 1980s and early 1990s when Western Mining Corporation undertook exploration and defined the N01 ore pod and developed the mine via a decline from Wedding Guest island, in the middle of the Lake Zot salt lake.

Mariners has a current in-ground reserve of 105,000 tons @ 4.0% Ni for 4,020 nickel tons and an inferred resource of 346,000 tons @ 4.5% Ni for a total of 15,700 nickel tons.

Mariners is hosted in a north plunging trough structure on the footwall of the Mariners Contact of the Widgiemooltha Komatiite and has the form of a series of partially overlapping kidney-shaped pods of nickel sulfide ore arranged en-echelon down the plunge line. This has been interpreted as disjunction and reassembly of an originally contiguous ribbon of nickel sulfide ore by structure.

Mariners is renowned for its extremely high arsenic contents, with common arsenopyrite, nickeline, gersdorffite and other arseno-sulfide minerals common in the ore during the earlier years of mining. This has, at times, restricted the output from the Mariners mine due to the need to blend Mariners ore with lower arsenic feedstock to avoid penalties for excessive arsenic.

Similar to the Miitel orebody, Mariners is hosted in a strongly talc-carbonated komatiite, though magnesium contents are higher favoring a more talc-magnesite assemblage.

Mariners was not named by Western Mining. Instead, due to a flood on the salt lake inundating the drilling rig during its discovery, the orebody was named Mariners because the drills were under water at the time.

=== Redross ===
Redross was explored by Anaconda Resources in the late 1960s and was identified by gossan searching by Ross Kennedy, who is a redhead, hence "Red Ross".

Redross was mined initially via a vertical shaft sunk in 1971-72, which was initially placed on care and maintenance prior to being activated in late 1974. The mine was worked from late 1974 to early 1976, when it was closed due to unprofitability.

Poor management within Anaconda Resources and low nickel prices led to its demise. The ore from Redross was trucked to Kalgoorlie for treatment in double belly-dumper roadtrains by Gascoyne Trading, the transport division of Wesfarmers.

The Redross shaft was initially worked on a two-shift basis, but around May 1975, the operation was extended to three shifts. The workers at Redross were housed in Norseman and were bussed to the mine at every shift changeover.

Anaconda spent a large amount of money installing many houses in Norseman for their Redross employees, and many of these houses are still there (2012).

A vertical mine shaft similar to Redross was sunk on the nearby Wannaway ore reserve in 1971-72, and this shaft, headframe and buildings were also placed on care and maintenance.

The Wannaway shaft was never activated as an operating vertical shaft mine, and was vandalised over many years and finally dismantled.

An open pit commenced on the Redross minesite in the early 1990s to extract the remnants and extensions of the original Redross ore body, and a decline was added later to extract ore from underground.

Mincor Resources NL is currently mining the last remnants of the orebody. Current resources and reserves are 297,000 tons @ 4.2% for 12,453 contained nickel tons.

The Redross N01C orebody has the form of a half-oval plunging to the south. The N01C is flanked by the N10 ore position which is interpreted to be flanking faces ore developed adjacent to the trough. Several parallel and sub-parallel ore trends are developed along strike from Redross, including the N20, N20 Upper and N30 positions, none of which are currently economic.

The trough and ore is highly deformed and suffers significant post-deposition dislocation by a series of north-south trending strike-slip faults.

The komatiite locally is highly magnesian and favours talc-magnesite assemblages, having been intensely talc-carbonated. Accessory minerals observed in the ore body include nickeline, nickeliferous chalcopyrite, cuprous pentlandite, arsenian pentlandite, violarite and arsenopyrite.

== See also ==
- Jerdacuttup River
- Serpentinite
- Metamorphism
- Komatiite
- Ore genesis
- Talc carbonate
