= Brianyoungite =

Secondary zinc carbonate mineral

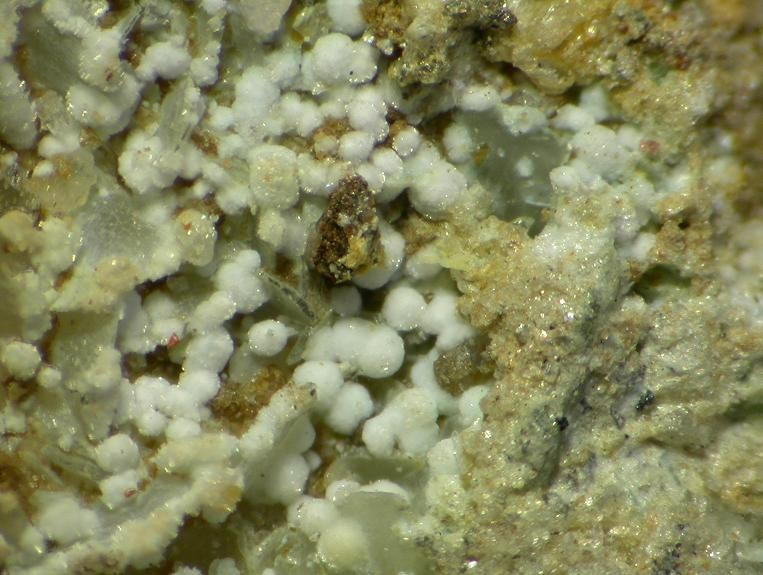
- Brianyoungite from Germany

General
- Category: Carbonate mineral
- Formula: Zn_{3}(CO_{3},SO_{4})(OH)_{4}
- IMA symbol: Byo
- Strunz classification: 5.BF.30 (10 ed); 5/C.01-105 (8 ed)
- Dana classification: 17.1.15
- Crystal system: Monoclinic
- Crystal class: Prismatic (2/m) (same H-M symbol)
- Space group: C2/m
- Unit cell: 15.724 Å, b = 6.256 Å, c = 5.427 Å; β = 90°; Z = 4

Identification
- Color: White
- Crystal habit: Rosettes of thin blades, pseudo-orthorhombic with β close to 90°
- Cleavage: Perfect on {100}, possible on {001}
- Mohs scale hardness: 2 to 2.5
- Luster: Vitreous
- Streak: White
- Diaphaneity: Transparent to translucent
- Specific gravity: 3.93 to 4.09
- Optical properties: Biaxial
- Refractive index: n_{ω} = 1.635, n_{ε} = 1.650
- Birefringence: δ = 1.635
- Solubility: Readily soluble with effervescence in acids
- Other characteristics: Non-fluorescent

Brianyoungite is a secondary zinc carbonate mineral. The Commission on New Minerals, Nomenclature and Classification (CNMNC) of the International Mineralogical Association (IMA) classifies it as a carbonate with the formula Zn_{3}(CO_{3})(OH)_{4}, but sulfate groups SO_{4} also occupy the carbonate CO_{3} positions, in the ratio of about one sulfate to three carbonates, so other sources give the formula as Zn_{3}(CO_{3},SO_{4})(OH)_{4}, and Gaines et al. classify the mineral as a compound carbonate. It is similar in appearance to hydrozincite, another zinc carbonate. It was discovered in 1991 and designated IMA1991-053. In 1993 it was named "brianyoungite" after Brian Young (born 1947), a field geologist with the British Geological Survey, who provided the first specimens.

== Appearance ==
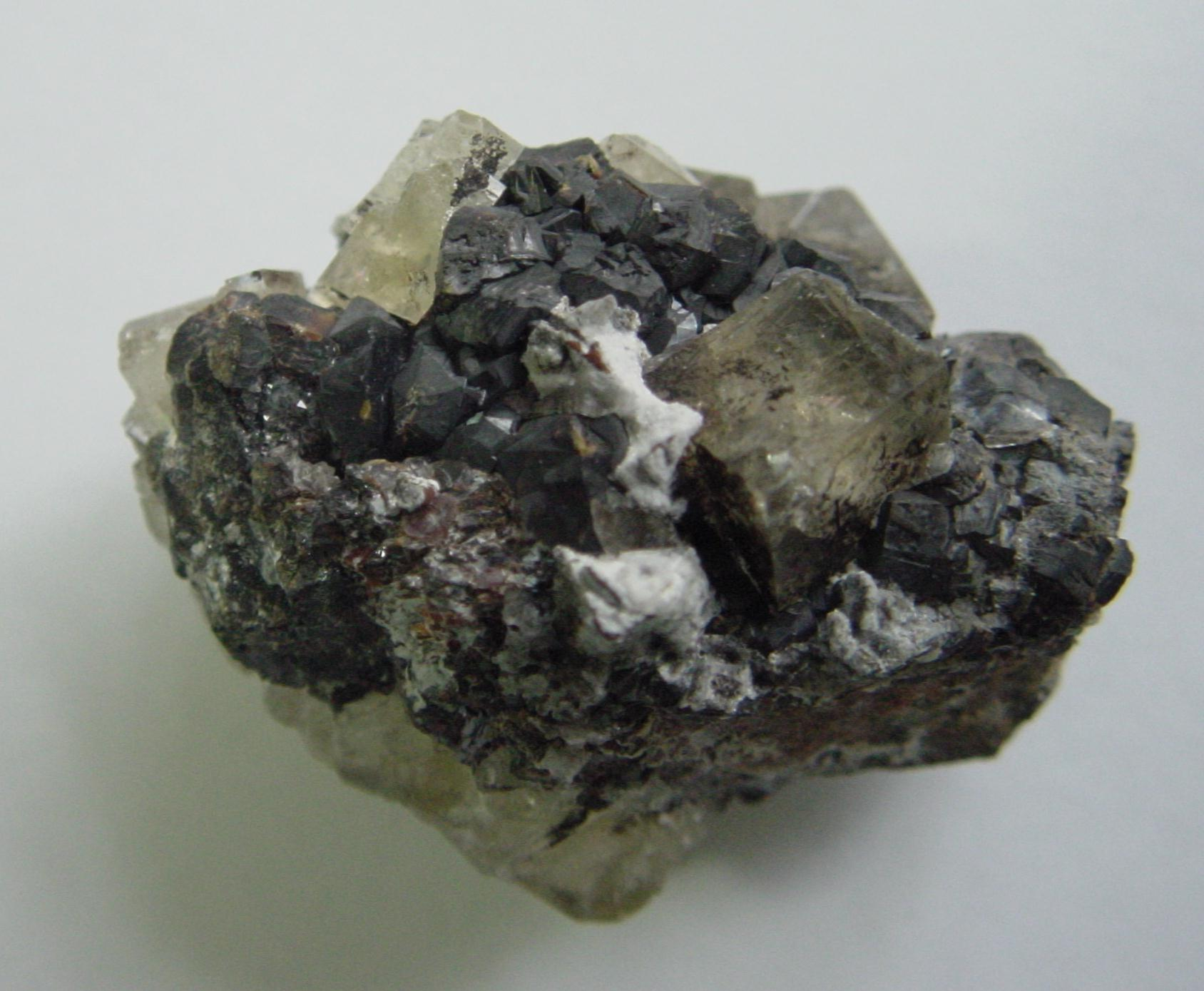
Brianyoungite (white) with fluorite and sphalerite from the Brownley Hill Mine, Cumbria, England.

The mineral occurs as tiny rosettes less than 100 μm across, composed of thin blades just one or two micrometers across, elongated parallel to the b crystal axis, and tapering to a sharp point. The crystals are white and transparent to translucent, with a vitreous lustre and a white streak.

== Structure ==
The mineral belongs in the orthorhombic crystal system, or the monoclinic with β (the angle between the a and c crystal axes) close to 90^{o}. The space group is unknown, but assumed to be either P2_{1}/m, P21 or P2221. The structure is similar to that of hydrozincite. There are four formula units per unit cell (Z = 4) and the lengths of the sides of the unit cell are a = 15.724 Å, b = 6.256 Å and c = 5.427 Å.

== Physical properties ==
Brianyoungite is a soft mineral with Mohs hardness similar to halite, only 2 to 2 1/2 according to some sources, but others say that the hardness is not determinable. It is fairly dense, with specific gravity 3.93 to 4.09, similar to that of celestine. Cleavage is perfect perpendicular to the a crystal axis (perfect on {100}) and possible perpendicular to the c crystal axis (possible on {001}). It is readily soluble with effervescence in acids.

== Optical properties ==
The mineral is biaxial, with refractive indices n_{ω} = 1.635 and n_{ε} = 1.650 and maximum birefringence δ = 1.635. It exhibits straight extinction. It is not fluorescent.

== Occurrence ==
The type locality is the Bloomsberry Horse level of the Brownley Hill mine, Nenthead, Alston Moor District, North Pennines, North and Western Region (Cumberland), Cumbria, England. The type material is conserved at the Royal Museum of Scotland, Edinburgh, Scotland, 1992.17.1–8.
Brianyoungite occurs with gypsum on rubbly limestone in the oxidised zone of Brownley Hill Mine, and on specimens from the nearby Smallcleugh mine. It may be a secondary post-mining mineral. At the type locality it is associated with gypsum, smithsonite, pyrite and goethite.
