= Cadmium lactate =

Names
- Other names cadmium(2+);2-hydroxypropanoate, cadmium dilactate, bis(lactato)cadmium

Identifiers
| CAS Number | 16039-55-7 |
| 3D model (JSmol) | Interactive image |
| ChemSpider | 140476 |
| ECHA InfoCard | 100.036.512 |
| EC Number | 240-181-5 |
| PubChem CID | 159769 |
| RTECS number | EV1400000 |
| CompTox Dashboard (EPA) | DTXSID30936287 |
- InChI: InChI=1S/2C3H6O3.Cd/c2*1-2(4)3(5)6;/h2*2,4H,1H3,(H,5,6);/q;;+2/p-2 Key: HBWKVDXNTCJIOW-UHFFFAOYSA-L
- SMILES: CC(C(=O)[O-])O.CC(C(=O)[O-])O.[Cd+2]

Properties
| Chemical formula | C_{6}H_{10}CdO_{6} |
| Molar mass | 290.55 |
| Appearance | Colorless crystalls |
| Density | g/cm^{3} |
| Solubility in water | Very soluble |
- Except where otherwise noted, data are given for materials in their standard state (at 25 °C [77 °F], 100 kPa). Infobox references

Cadmium lactate is an organic chemical compound, a salt of cadmium and lactic acid with the formula Cd(C_{3}H_{5}O_{3})_{2}.

== Synthesis ==
Cadmium lactate can be obtained by dissolving cadmium carbonate in lactic acid. It can also be obtained by mixing boiling solutions of lactate of lime and cadmium sulfate.

== Physical properties ==
Cadmium lactate forms colorless (white) crystals. It is soluble in water but insoluble in ethanol. It is a carcinogen and poison.
