= Otwayite =

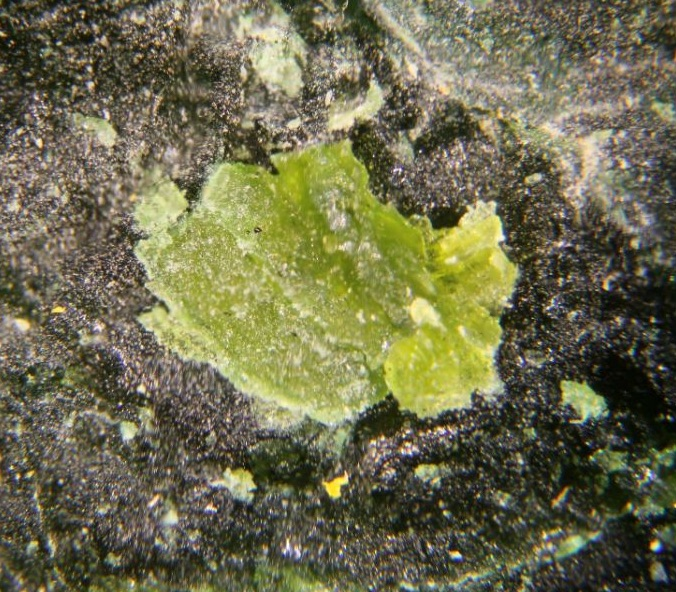
- Otwayite from the type locality in Otway Nickel deposit

General
- Category: Carbonate mineral
- Formula: Ni_{2}CO_{3}(OH)_{2}
- IMA symbol: Otw
- Strunz classification: 5.DA.15
- Crystal system: Orthorhombic; Unknown space group
- Unit cell: a = 10.18, b = 27.4, c = 3.22 [Å]; Z = 8

Identification
- Color: Bright green
- Crystal habit: Sprays of Fibrous bundles oriented perpendicular to veinlet walls; spherules and claylike coatings
- Mohs scale hardness: 4
- Luster: Silky to waxy
- Diaphaneity: Opaque to translucent
- Specific gravity: 3.41
- Optical properties: Biaxial
- Refractive index: n_{α} = 1.650 n_{γ} = 1.720
- Birefringence: δ = 0.070
- Pleochroism: Weak
- Dispersion: Very strong

Otwayite, Ni_{2}CO_{3}(OH)_{2}, is a hydrated nickel carbonate mineral. Otwayite is green, with a hardness of 4, a specific gravity of 3.4, and crystallises in the orthorhombic system.

== Occurrence ==
Otwayite is found in association with nullaginite and hellyerite in the Otway nickel deposit. It is found in association with theoprastite, hellyerite, gaspeite and a suite of other nickel carbonate minerals in the Lord Brassey Mine, Tasmania. Otwayite is found in association with gaspeite, hellyerite and kambaldaite in the Widgie Townsite nickel gossan, Widgiemooltha, Western Australia. It is also reported from the Pafuri nickel deposit, South Africa. It was first described in 1977 from the Otway Nickel Deposit, Nullagine, Pilbara Craton, Western Australia and named for Australian prospector Charles Albert Otway (born 1922).
