= Andersonite =

Uranyl carbonate mineral

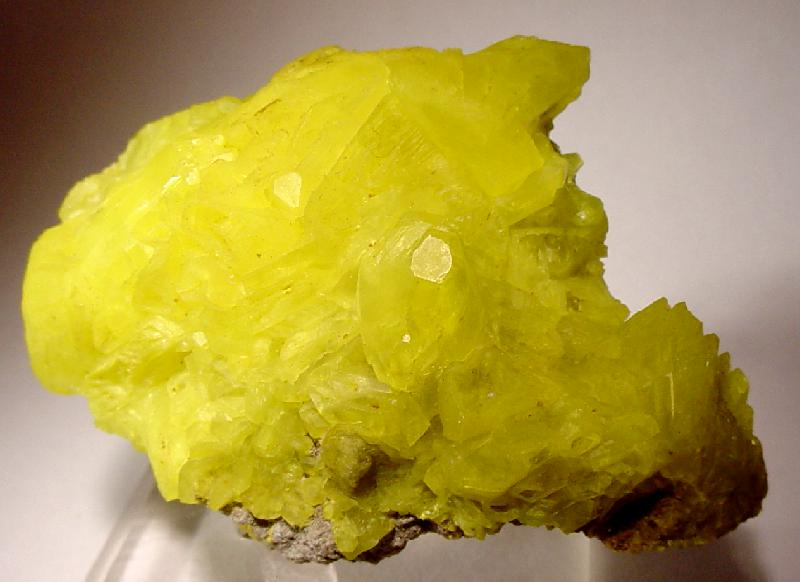
- Andersonite crystals from the Repete Mine, Blanding, San Juan County, Utah (size: 5.2 x 3.6 x 1.5 cm)

General
- Category: Carbonate minerals
- Formula: Na_{2}Ca(UO_{2})(CO_{3})_{3}·6H_{2}O
- IMA symbol: Anr
- Strunz classification: 5.ED.30
- Crystal system: Trigonal
- Crystal class: Hexagonal scalenohedral (3̅m); H-M symbol: (3̅ 2/m)
- Space group: R3̅m
- Unit cell: a = 18, c = 23.83 [Å]; Z = 18

Identification
- Color: Bright green to yellow-green
- Crystal habit: Rhombohedra, often flattened, pseudocubic; crystalline crusts, granular
- Mohs scale hardness: 2.5
- Luster: Vitreous
- Diaphaneity: Transparent to translucent
- Specific gravity: 2.8
- Optical properties: Uniaxial (+)
- Refractive index: n_{ω} = 1.520 n_{ε} = 1.540
- Birefringence: δ = 0.020
- Pleochroism: Visible O = colorless E = Light yellow
- Ultraviolet fluorescence: bright pale green to yellow-green
- Solubility: Soluble in water
- Other characteristics: Radioactive

Andersonite, Na_{2}Ca(UO_{2})(CO_{3})_{3}·6H_{2}O, or hydrated sodium calcium uranyl carbonate is a rare uranium carbonate mineral that was first described in 1948. Named after Charles Alfred Anderson (1902–1990) of the United States Geological Survey, who first described the mineral species, it is found in sandstone-hosted uranium deposits. It has a high vitreous to pearly luster and is fluorescent. Andersonite specimens will usually glow a bright lemon yellow (or green with blue hints depending on the deposit) in ultraviolet light. It is commonly found as translucent small rhombohedral crystals that have angles close to 90 degrees although its crystal system is nominally trigonal. Its Mohs hardness is 2.5, with an average specific gravity of 2.8.

It occurs in the oxidized zone of uranium-bearing polymetallic ore deposits. It also may occur as an efflorescent crust on the walls and timbers of uranium mines. As this mineral is water-soluble, samples must be stored in dry conditions. It occurs with schrockingerite, bayleyite, schwarzites, boltwoodite, liebigite and gypsum.

It was first described in 1948 for an occurrence in the Hillside Mine near Bagdad, Eureka District, Yavapai County, Arizona.
