= Bayleyite =

Uranium carbonate mineral

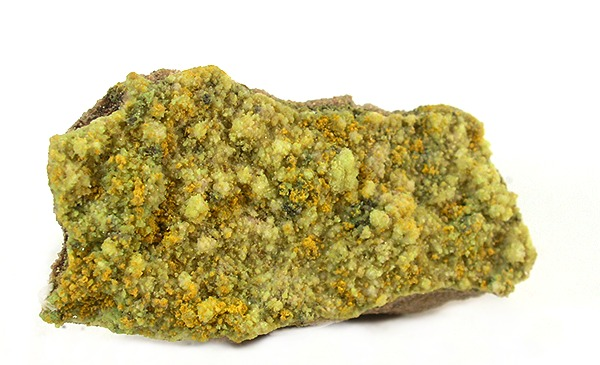
- Bayleyite sample from the Ambrosia Lake area, Grants District, New Mexico (size: 4.6 × 2.4 × 1.6 cm)

General
- Category: Carbonate mineral
- Formula: Mg_{2}(UO_{2})(CO_{3})_{3}·18(H_{2}O)
- IMA symbol: Byy
- Strunz classification: 5.ED.05
- Crystal system: Monoclinic
- Crystal class: Prismatic (2/m) (same H-M symbol)
- Space group: P2_{1}/c
- Unit cell: a = 26.65 Å, b = 15.31 Å, c = 6.53 Å; β = 93.07°; Z = 4

Identification
- Color: Sulfur yellow
- Crystal habit: Clusters of prismatic crystals, crusts
- Fracture: Conchoidal
- Mohs scale hardness: 2–2.5
- Luster: Vitreous
- Diaphaneity: Semitransparent
- Specific gravity: 2.05
- Optical properties: Biaxial (−)
- Refractive index: n_{α} = 1.453 – 1.455 n_{β} = 1.490 – 1.492 n_{γ} = 1.498 – 1.502
- Birefringence: δ = 0.045 – 0.047
- Pleochroism: Visible: X = Pinkish, Y = Light yellow, Z = Light yellow
- 2V angle: Measured: 30°
- Ultraviolet fluorescence: Weak; yellow-green to pale greenish under LW and SW
- Other characteristics: Radioactive

Bayleyite is a uranium carbonate mineral with the chemical formula: Mg_{2}(UO_{2})(CO_{3})_{3}·18(H_{2}O). It is a secondary mineral which contains magnesium, uranium and carbon. It is a bright yellow color. Its crystal habit is acicular but is more commonly found as crusts on uranium bearing ores. It has a Mohs hardness of about 2–2.5.

== Occurrence ==
It was first described in 1948 for an occurrence in the Hillside mine, north of Bagdad, Yavapai County, Arizona and named for mineralogist William Shirley Bayley (1861–1943) of the University of Illinois. It occurs as an efflorescence or coating on other secondary minerals and often is deposited on mine walls and workings. It occurs with schrockingerite, andersonite, swartzite and gypsum in the Hillside mine; with schrockingerite and gypsum in the Hideout mine in Utah; and with tyuyamunite, uranophane, liebigite and carnotite in the Powder River Basin in Wyoming.
