= Paratooite-(La) =

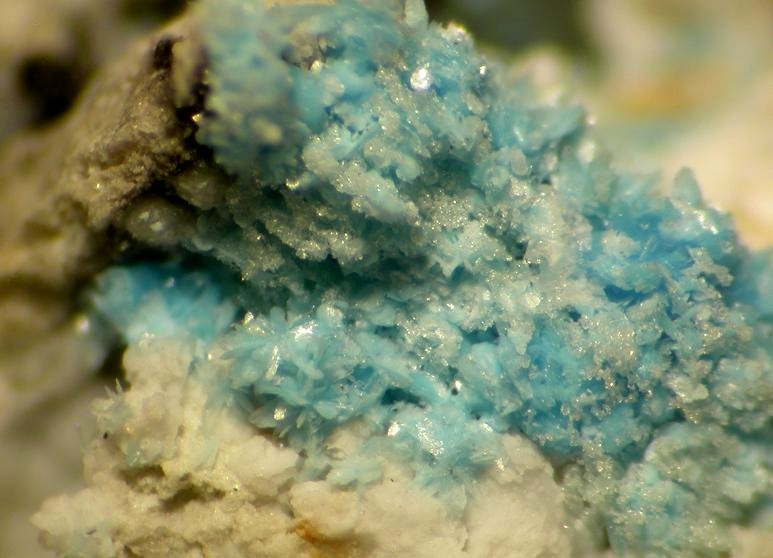
- Paratooite-(La): Locality: Paratoo copper mine, Yunta, Olary Province, South Australia, Australia. Field of view 6 mm.

General
- Category: Carbonate mineral
- Formula: (La,Sr,Ca)_{4}CuCa(Na,Ca)_{2}(CO_{3})_{8}
- IMA symbol: Pto-La
- Strunz classification: 5/B.0; 5.AD.20 (Nickel-Strunz)
- Crystal system: Orthorhombic
- Crystal class: Dipyramidal: mmm
- Space group: Pbam
- Unit cell: a = 7.2250, b = 12.7626 c = 10.0559 [Å]

Identification
- Color: pale turquoise-blue to pale blue
- Crystal habit: blades (sheaves) intergrown to form spray-like aggregates
- Cleavage: {100} (possible)
- Mohs scale hardness: 4 (probably)
- Luster: vitreous or pearly
- Streak: pale blue
- Specific gravity: 1.97-2.02 (measured)
- Optical properties: biaxial negative, α = 1.605(3), β = 1.696(3), γ = 1.752(2)
- Pleochroism: moderate, very pale blue (X) to greenish blue (Y = Z)
- 2V angle: 72.6 °

Paratooite-(La) is a complex lanthanum copper(II) calcium sodium carbonate mineral, representing a unique elemental combination among the known minerals. It is a secondary, weathering mineral. There is a heterovalent diadochy substitution of lanthanum by strontium and calcium; also sodium is substituted by calcium in the mineral. Its structure proved to be more difficult to describe within the initial approach. It was later shown to be a superstructure of another rare earth carbonate mineral, carbocernaite. The "-(La)" suffix in the mineral's name is known as Levinson suffix. It refers to the particular element, of a group of elements (notably lanthanides), that dominates in the particular structural site. As such, the element would show major, dominant occupancy at this particular site.
