= Lanthanite =

Group of isostructural rare earth element carbonate minerals

Lanthanite-(La), Lanthanite-(Nd), Lanthanite-(Ce)
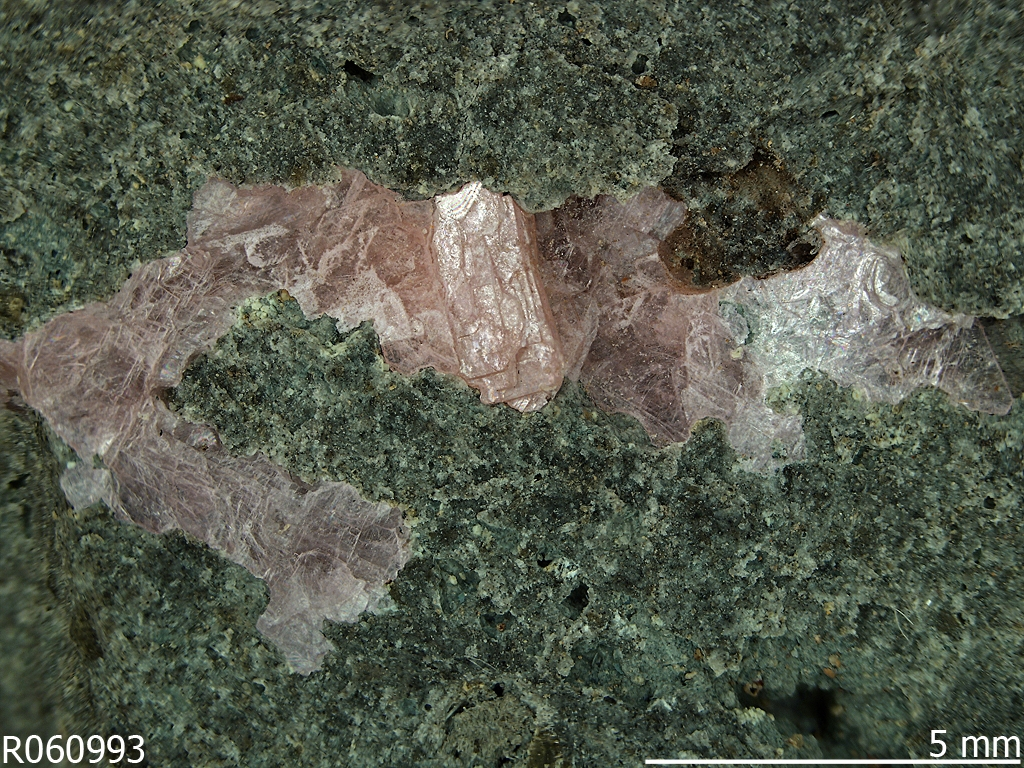
- Lanthanite-(Nd) from Mitsukoshi, Hizen-cho, Karatsu City, Saga Prefecture, Japan.

General
- Category: Carbonate minerals
- Formula: (REE)_{2}(CO_{3})_{3}·8(H_{2}O)
- IMA symbol: Ltn
- Strunz classification: 5.CC.25
- Dana classification: (La): 15.04.02.01 (Nd): 15.04.02.02 (Ce): 15.04.02.03
- Crystal system: Orthorhombic
- Crystal class: Dipyramidal (mmm); H-M symbol: (2/m 2/m 2/m)
- Space group: Pbnb
- Unit cell: a = 9.476(4)–9.483(6) b = 16.940(8)–16.938(11) c = 8.942(4)–8.965(3) [Å], Z = 4

Identification
- Color: Pale pink to purple
- Crystal habit: Platy
- Twinning: Common on {101}
- Cleavage: Micaceous, perfect on {101}
- Fracture: Uneven
- Tenacity: Sectile
- Mohs scale hardness: 2.5
- Luster: Vitreous to pearly
- Streak: White
- Density: 2.78–2.84 (measured), 2.79–2.816 (calculated)
- Optical properties: Biaxial (−)
- 2V angle: 58°–61° (measured), 60°–63.5° (calculated)

Lanthanites are a group of isostructural rare earth element (REE) carbonate minerals. This group comprises the minerals lanthanite-(La), lanthanite-(Ce), and lanthanite-(Nd). This mineral group has the general chemical formula of (REE)_{2}(CO_{3})_{3}·8(H_{2}O). Lanthanites include La, Ce, and Nd as major elements and often contain subordinate amounts of other REEs including praseodymium (Pr), samarium (Sm), europium (Eu) and dysprosium (Dy). The lanthanite crystal structure consists of layers of tenfold-coordinated REE-oxygen (O) polyhedra and carbonate (CO^{2−}_{3}) groups connected by hydrogen bonds to interlayer water molecules, forming a highly hydrated structure.

== Origin and formation ==
Lanthanites are frequently found as secondary minerals formed by the weathering of other minerals and occur as scales or tabular crystals. Originally identified at Bastnäs, Sweden, they have subsequently been found in New Zealand, Japan, Madagascar, Wales, China, France, Germany, Greenland, Finland, Canada, Austria, Romania, Norway, Brazil, and the United States.

Recently, a different mechanism of formation of lanthanites was discovered: Lanthanites also can form via a highly hydrated, nanoparticulate and poorly ordered carbonate precursor. The lifetime of this rare-earth bearing precursor as well as the kinetics of crystallization of the various REE-lanthanites are dependent on the specific trivalent rare-earth ion involved in the reaction. The times needed for lanthanites to fully crystallize increase linearly with the ionic potential of the trivalent rare-earth ion (La^{3+}, Ce^{3+}, Pr^{3+}, Nd^{3+}) present in their structure. The differences in these ion sizes and ionic potential as well as differences in dehydration energy of the trivalent rare-earth ions control the lifetime of the poorly ordered precursor and thus also the crystallization kinetics of the lanthanites. Furthermore, they also affect the structural characteristics (e.g. unit-cell dimensions and standard shape) of the crystals.

== Other sources ==
- Webmineral data
- Mindat with location data
- RRUFF Project
