= Dresserite =

Carbonate mineral

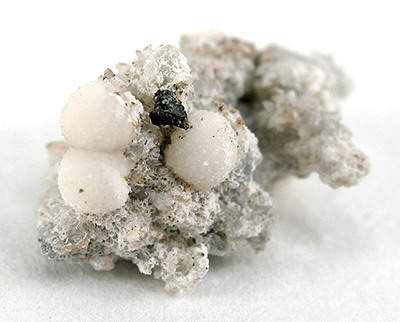

General
- Category: Carbonate minerals
- Formula: BaAl_{2}(CO_{3})_{2}(OH)_{4} · H_{2}O
- IMA symbol: Dsr
- Strunz classification: 5.DB.10
- Dana classification: 16b.2.1.2
- Crystal system: Orthorhombic
- Crystal class: Dipyramidal; H-M symbol: mmm (2/m 2/m 2/m)
- Unit cell: 878.36

Identification
- Color: White
- Mohs scale hardness: 2.5 - 3
- Luster: Vitreous, silky
- Streak: White
- Diaphaneity: Transparent
- Specific gravity: 2.96
- Density: 2.96
- Optical properties: Biaxial (-)
- Refractive index: n_{α} = 1.518 n_{β} = 1.590 n_{γ} = 1.601
- Birefringence: 0.083
- 2V angle: 30° - 40°
- Dispersion: Relatively strong
- Ultraviolet fluorescence: None

Dresserite is a mineral of the dresserite group, named in honor of geologist John Alexander Dresser. It was approved by the IMA in 1968, only a year after was it published. The rare mineral can only be found in Francon quarry, Canada. The quarry is located in the city of Montréal, but had been closed in 1981 and is not expected to be reopened in the future.

== Properties ==
It is a member of the carbonates family, mostly consisting of oxygen (44.29%), barium (34.56%) and aluminum (13.58%), but otherwise contains carbon (6.05%) and hydrogen (1.52%). It is associated with weloganite, dawsonite, quartz, and plagioclase. It grows into tapering acicular crystals, elongated along [001] and bladed on {010}. It is typically in divergent spherical and hemispherical aggregates. It occurs in cavities in alkalic sill in limestone. Its size is up to 5 mm, and it is soluble in dilute hydrogen chloride, and dissolves readily with a effervescence. It is the barium analogue of dundasite. Dresserite does not show any kind of luminescence whatsoever. The measured density of the mineral, due to its fibrous nature, is too low. The differential thermal analysis (DTA) curve of the mineral is similar to dundasite's in appearance. The principal endothermic peak is at 384°C. When heated up to this degree, dresserite loses all of its water and carbon dioxide.
