= Aurichalcite =

Basic carbonate of zinc and copper

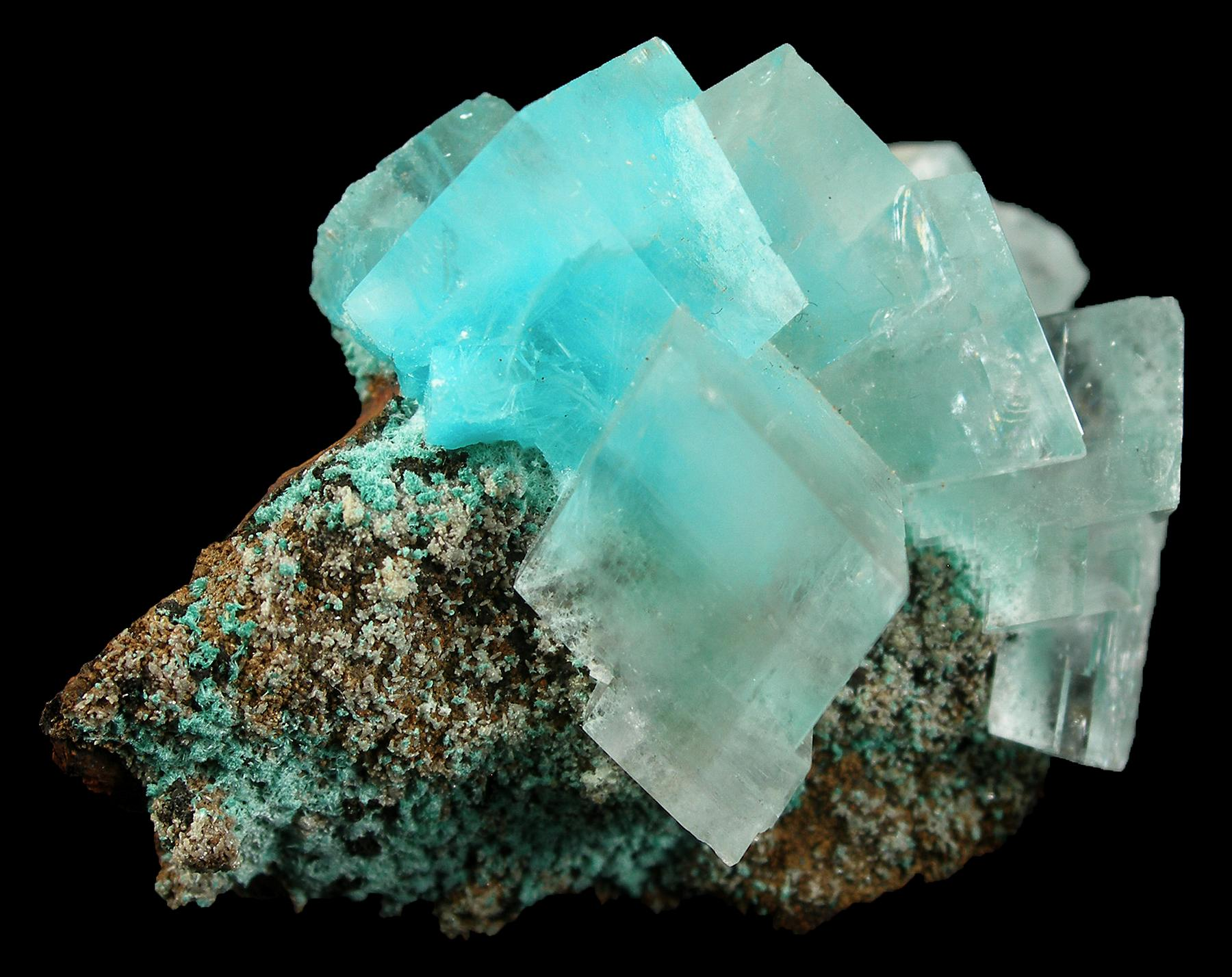

General
- Category: Carbonate mineral
- Formula: (Zn,Cu)_{5}[(OH)_{3}|CO_{3}]_{2}
- IMA symbol: Ach
- Strunz classification: 5.BA.15
- Crystal system: Monoclinic
- Crystal class: Prismatic (2/m) (same H-M symbol)
- Space group: P2_{1}/m
- Unit cell: a = 13.82, b = 6.419 c = 5.29 [Å] β = 101.04°; Z = 2

Identification
- Color: Pale green, greenish blue, light blue; colorless to pale blue, pale green in transmitted light
- Crystal habit: Typically in tufted divergent sprays or spherical aggregates, may be in thick crusts; rarely columnar, laminated or granular
- Twinning: Observed in X-ray patterns
- Cleavage: {010} and {100} Perfect
- Fracture: Uneven
- Mohs scale hardness: 2
- Luster: Pearly, silky
- Streak: Light blue
- Diaphaneity: Transparent
- Specific gravity: 3.96
- Optical properties: Biaxial (−)
- Refractive index: n_{α} = 1.655 n_{β} = 1.740 n_{γ} = 1.744
- Birefringence: 0.0890
- Pleochroism: Weak colorless to pale green
- 2V angle: Measured: 1° to 4°, Calculated: 22°

Aurichalcite is a carbonate mineral, usually found as a secondary mineral in copper and zinc deposits. Its chemical formula is (Zn,Cu)_{5}(CO_{3})_{2}(OH)_{6}. The zinc to copper ratio is about 5:4. Copper (Cu^{2+}) gives aurichalcite its green-blue colors.

== Occurrence ==
Aurichalcite typically occurs in the oxidized zone of copper and zinc deposits. Associated minerals include: rosasite, smithsonite, hemimorphite, hydrozincite, malachite and azurite.

It was first described in 1839 by Bottger who named the mineral for its zinc and copper content after the Greek όρειχαλκος, for "mountain brass" or "mountain copper", the name of orichalcum, a fabulous metal, mentioned in the legend of the mythic lost continent Atlantis. The type locality is the Loktevskoye Mine, Upper Loktevka River, Rudny Altai, Altai Krai, Western Siberia, Russia.

== Crystallography ==
Aurichalcite displays prismatic crystals often in the form of encrustations and sometimes columnar structures. The crystal system is monoclinic.
