= Alumohydrocalcite =

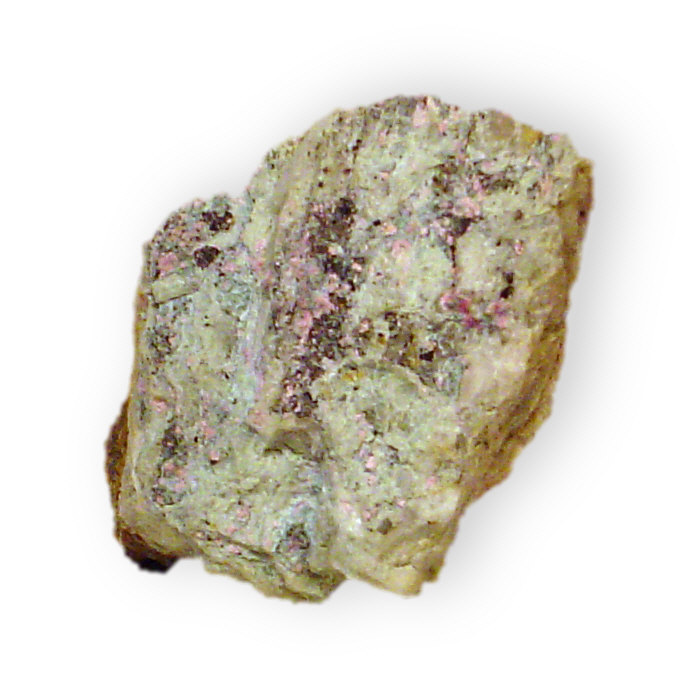
- Alumohydrocalcite found on Mount Hamilton in California

General
- Category: Minerals
- Formula: CaAl_{2}(CO_{3})_{2}(OH)_{4}·4H_{2}O
- IMA symbol: Ahcal

Identification
- Color: Chalky white to pale blue, pale yellow, cream, gray; pale rose or brownish pink to dark violet in Cr-bearing varieties
- Tenacity: Brittle
- Mohs scale hardness: 2.5
- Diaphaneity: Transparent, Translucent, Opaque
- Specific gravity: 2.21 - 2.24

Alumohydrocalcite (IMA symbol: Ahcal) is a calcium aluminium carbonate mineral with the chemical formula CaAl_{2}(CO_{3})_{2}(OH)_{4}·4H_{2}O. Its type locality is Khakassia, Russia.
