= Znucalite =

Rare radioactive mineral

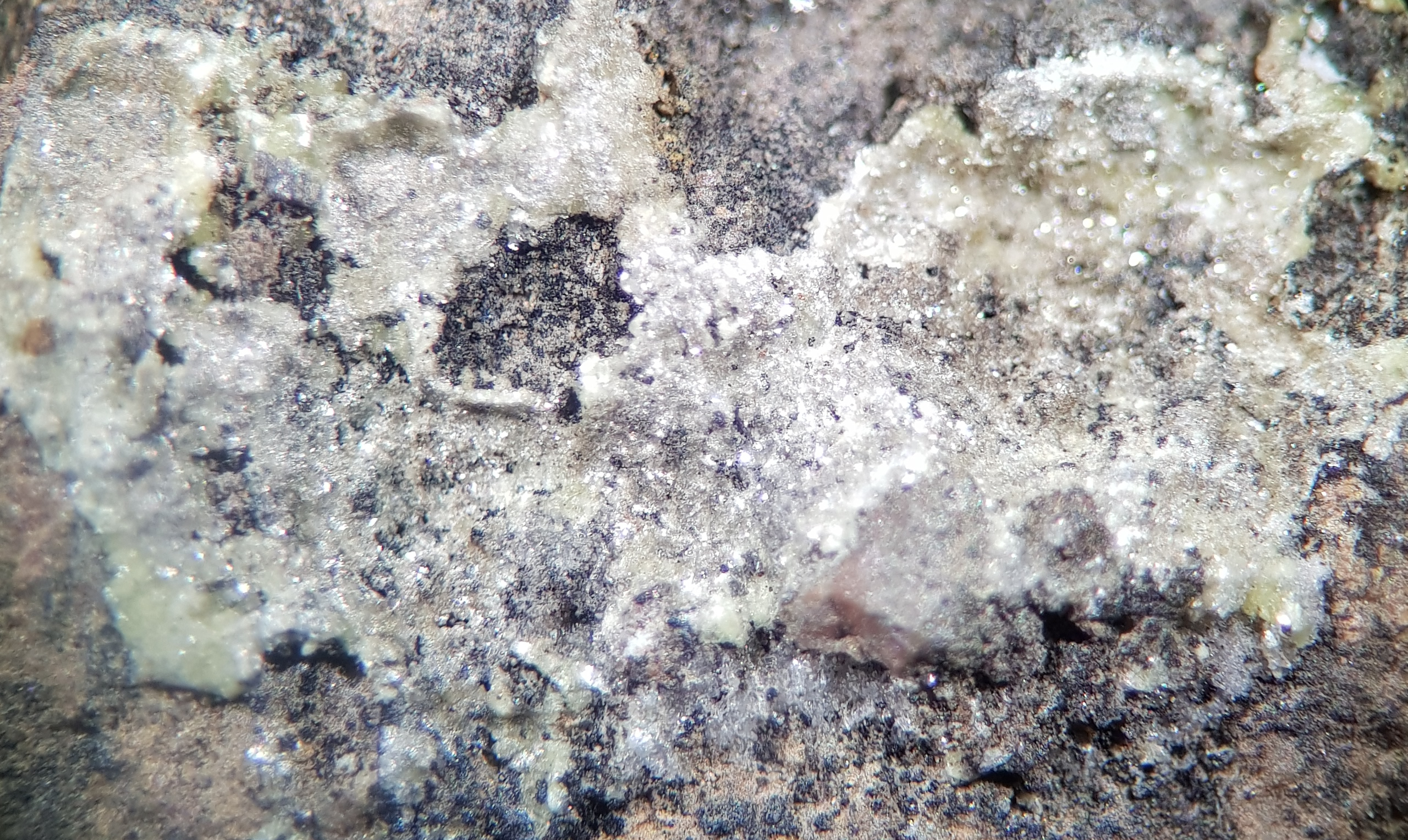

General
- Category: Carbonate minerals
- Formula: CaZn_{11}(UO_{2})(CO_{3})_{3}(OH)_{20}·4(H_{2}O)
- IMA symbol: Znu
- Strunz classification: 5.ED.45
- Crystal system: Triclinic; Unknown space group
- Unit cell: a = 12.692 Å, b = 25.096 Å c = 11.685 Å; α = 89.8 β = 91.78, γ = 90.37; Z = 4

Identification
- Color: White to light yellow
- Luster: Silky
- Diaphaneity: Translucent
- Other characteristics: Radioactive

Znucalite or CaZn_{11}(UO_{2})(CO_{3})_{3}(OH)_{20}·4(H_{2}O) is a rare, radioactive, white to pale cream colored uranium-containing carbonate mineral, hydrated calcium zinc uranyl carbonate hydroxide. Znucalite crystallizes in the orthorhombic system, often forming aggregates or crusts, and is found as a rare secondary species in carbonate-hosted (meaning it is mined from carbonate containing formations such as limestone) polymetallic veins, and nearby oxidizing uranium veins; on dump material and coating mine walls, apparently of post-mine origin. It fluoresces yellow-green under UV light.

It was first described in 1989, after being discovered in Lill Mine, Černojamské deposit (Black pits deposit) in the Czech Republic. It was named in 1990 by Petr Ondruš, František Veselovský, and R. Rybka for its constituent elements.
