= Jerdacuttup River =

River in Western Australia

Coordinates: 33°55′8″S 120°14′44″E

- Jerdacuttup River, near Jerdacuttup road

Location
- Country: Australia

Physical characteristics
- Source
  - location: North of Ravensthorpe
  - elevation: 274 metres (899 ft)
- Mouth
  - location: Jerdacuttup Lakes
- Length: 65 km (40 mi)
- Basin size: 1,818 km^{2} (702 sq mi)
- Discharge
  - average: 4,440 ML/a (0.141 m^{3}/s; 4.97 cu ft/s)

The Jerdacuttup River is a river in the Goldfields-Esperance region of Western Australia. The water in the river is naturally saline.

The river rises on the edge of the Yilgarn Plateau north of Ravensthorpe below Mount Short and drains the eastern side of the Ravensthorpe Range before flowing south and draining into the Jerdacuttup lakes close to the Southern Ocean and east of Hopetoun.

The tributaries of the river include Moolyall Creek, Woodenup Creek, Cordingup Creek, Carlingup Creek, Boaiup Creek, Bandalup Creek and Burlabup Creek.

The name is Aboriginal in origin and first charted by John Forrest in 1870. The nearby town of Jerdacuttup also shares the name.

The river is the location of a significant komatiite deposit, which was listed on the Register of the National Estate.

== See also ==
- Widgiemooltha Komatiite
