= Reederite-(Y) =

General
- Category: Carbonate minerals
- Formula: (Na,Mn,Fe)_{15}(Y,REE)_{2}(CO_{3})_{9}(SO_{3}F)Cl
- IMA symbol: Rde-Y
- Strunz classification: 5.BF.20
- Crystal system: Hexagonal
- Crystal class: Trigonal dipyramidal (3̅m); H-M symbol: (6̅)
- Space group: P6̅
- Unit cell: a = 8.773, c = 10.746 [Å]; Z = 1

Identification
- Color: yellow to orange-brown
- Luster: vitreous
- Streak: white

Reederite-(Y) is a rare mineral with the formula (Na,Mn,Fe)_{15}(Y,REE)_{2}(CO_{3})_{9}(SO_{3}F)Cl. It is the only known mineral with fluorosulfate (fluorosulfonate). "REE" in the formula stands for rare earth elements other than yttrium, that is mostly cerium, with traces of neodymium, dysprosium, lanthanum and erbium. The formula also includes a Levinson suffix "-(Y)" pointing to the dominance of yttrium at the corresponding site. Reederite-(Y) crystallizes in the hexagonal crystal system with the space group P6̅, rarely seen among minerals.
