= Rosasite =

Mineral of copper zinc carbonate

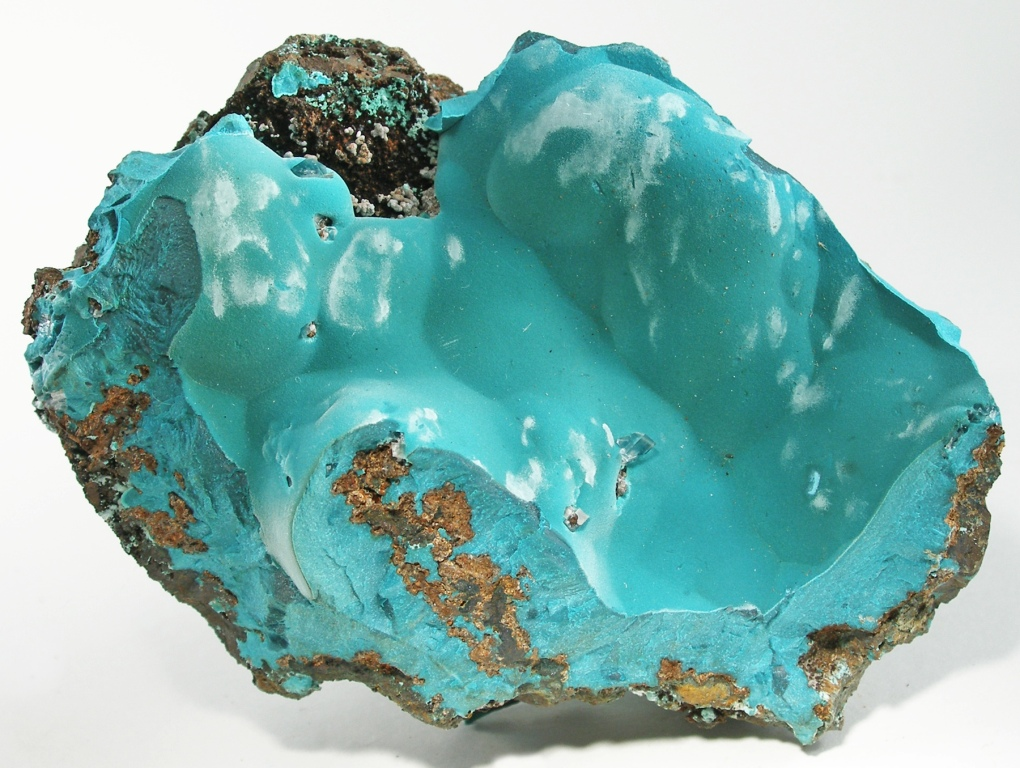
- Blue velvety mass lining a cavity

General
- Category: Carbonate mineral
- Formula: (Cu,Zn)_{2}(CO_{3})(OH)_{2}
- IMA symbol: Rss
- Strunz classification: 5.BA.10
- Crystal system: Monoclinic
- Crystal class: Prismatic (2/m) (same H-M symbol)
- Space group: P2_{1}/a
- Unit cell: a = 12.873(3) Å, b = 9.354(3) Å c = 3.156(2) Å; β = 110.36(3)°; Z = 4

Identification
- Color: Blue, bluish green, green
- Crystal habit: Acicular crystals as radiating fibrous clusters; botryoidal; mammillary; encrustations
- Twinning: On {100}
- Cleavage: Perfect on {100} and {010}
- Fracture: Splintery, fibrous
- Tenacity: Brittle
- Mohs scale hardness: 4
- Luster: Silky, vitreous to dull
- Streak: Light blue or green
- Specific gravity: 4–4.2
- Optical properties: Biaxial (−)
- Refractive index: n_{α} = 1.672 – 1.688 n_{β} = 1.796 – 1.830 n_{γ} = 1.811 – 1.831
- Birefringence: δ = 0.139 – 0.143
- Pleochroism: Strong: X = pale emerald green or colourless; Y = dark emerald green or pale blue; Z = dark emerald green or pale blue
- 2V angle: Measured: 33°
- Solubility: Effervesces in cold, dilute hydrochloric acid

Major varieties
- Nickeloan rosasite: Dark green

Rosasite is a carbonate mineral with minor potential for use as a zinc and copper ore. Chemically, it is a copper zinc carbonate hydroxide with a copper to zinc ratio of 3:2, occurring in the secondary oxidation zone of copper-zinc deposits. It was originally discovered in 1908 in the Rosas mine in Sardinia, Italy, and is named after the location. Fibrous blue-green rosasite crystals are usually found in globular aggregates, often associated with red limonite and other colorful minerals. It is very similar to aurichalcite, but can be distinguished by its superior hardness.
