= Adamsite-(Y) =

Mineral

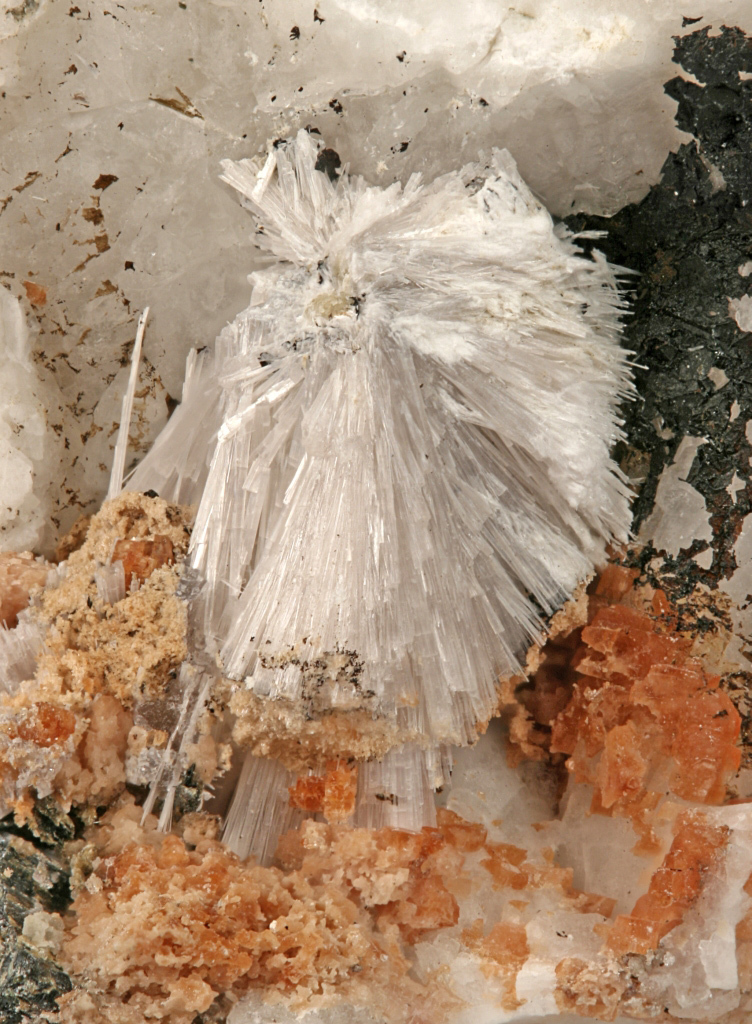
- Cluster of prismatic white crystals of adamsite from Canada

General
- Category: Carbonate minerals
- Formula: NaY(CO_{3})_{2}·6H_{2}O
- IMA symbol: Ads-Y
- Strunz classification: 5.CC.30
- Crystal system: Triclinic
- Crystal class: Pinacoidal (1̅) (same H-M symbol)
- Space group: P1̅

Identification
- Color: Colorless, white, pale pink, pale purple
- Cleavage: Perfect on {001}; good on {100}, {010}
- Tenacity: Brittle
- Mohs scale hardness: 3.0
- Luster: Pearly
- Density: 2.27 g/cm^{3}

Adamsite-(Y) (previously IMA 1999-020) is a carbonate mineral made from sodium, yttrium, carbon, oxygen, and hydrogen. Its chemical formula is NaY(CO_{3})_{2}·6H_{2}O. Adamsite-(Y) is named after Frank Dawson Adams (1859–1942), professor of geology, McGill University. Its Mohs scale rating is 3.

== See also ==
- List of minerals
- List of minerals named after people
