= Otavite =

Cadmium carbonate mineral

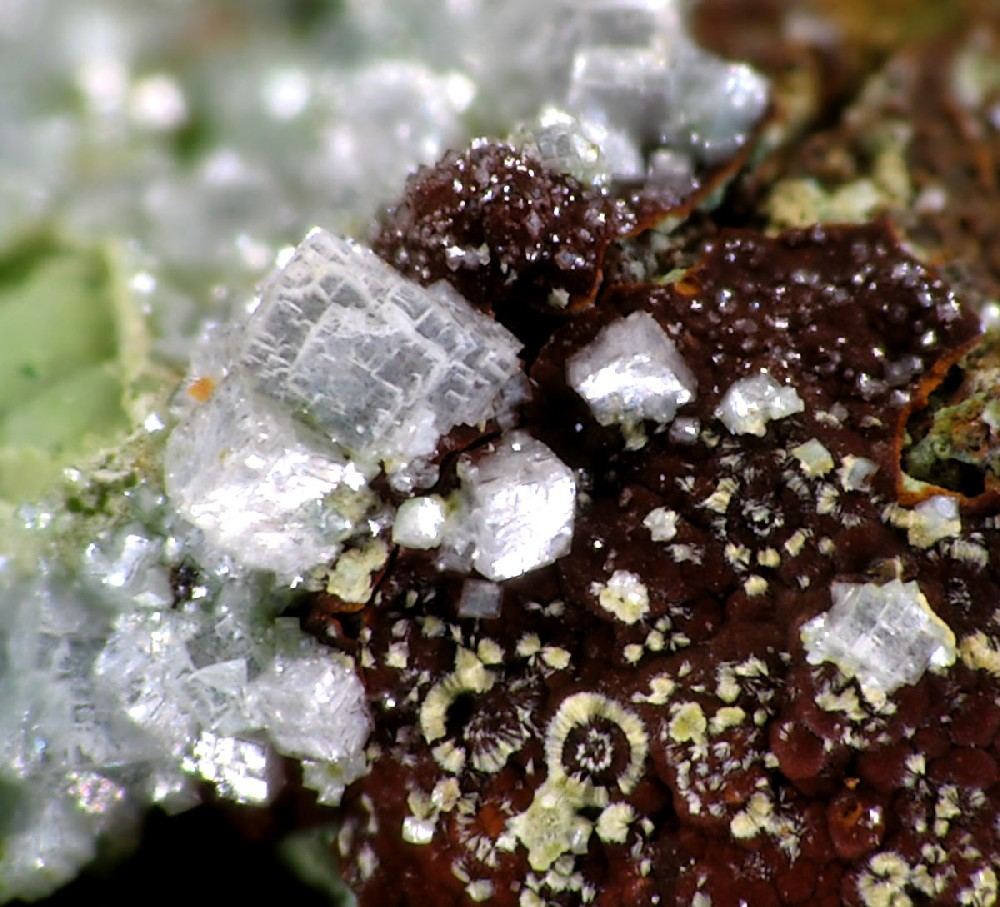
- Otavite, Tsumeb, Oshikoto Region, Namibia

General
- Category: Carbonate minerals
- Formula: CdCO_{3}
- IMA symbol: Ota
- Strunz classification: 5.AB.05
- Crystal system: Trigonal
- Crystal class: Hexagonal scalenohedral (3̅m); H-M symbol: (3̅ 2/m)
- Space group: R3̅c

Otavite is a rare cadmium carbonate mineral with the formula CdCO_{3}. Otavite crystallizes in the trigonal system and forms encrustations and small scalenohedral crystals that have a pearly to adamantine luster. The color is white to reddish to yellow brown. Its Mohs hardness is 3.5 to 4 and the specific gravity is 5.04. Associated minerals include azurite, calcite, malachite, and smithsonite.

It was first described in 1906 from the Tsumeb district near Otavi, Namibia.
