= Hydrozincite =

White carbonate mineral

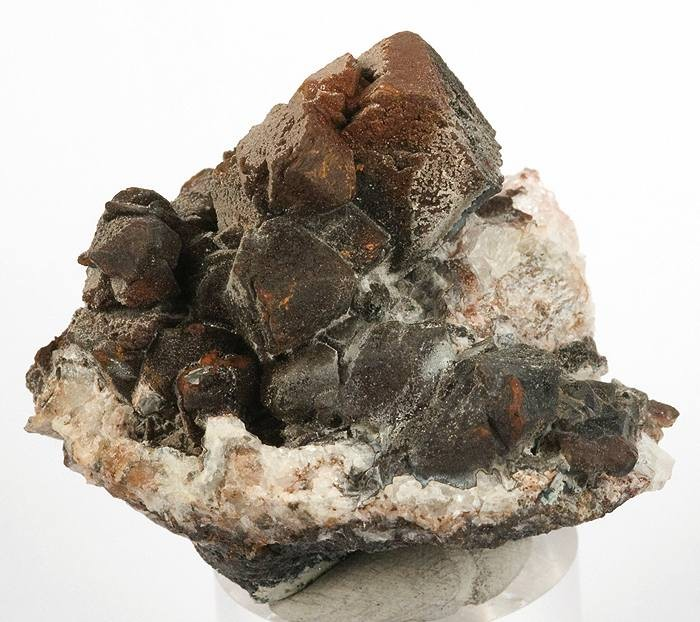

General
- Category: Carbonate mineral
- Formula: Zn_{5}(CO_{3})_{2}(OH)_{6}
- IMA symbol: Hznc
- Strunz classification: 5.BA.15
- Crystal system: Monoclinic
- Crystal class: Prismatic (2/m) (same H-M symbol)
- Space group: C2/m
- Unit cell: a = 13.58 Å, b = 6.28 Å, c = 5.41 Å; β = 95.51°, Z = 2

Identification
- Color: White to grey, stained pale pink, or pale yellow or brown; colourless in transmitted light.
- Crystal habit: Lathlike or bladed crystals uncommon, in fibrous, stalactitic, reniform, pisolitic aggregates; also earthy, chalky, massive
- Twinning: Contact twinning on {100}
- Cleavage: Perfect on {100}
- Fracture: Irregular/uneven
- Tenacity: Very brittle
- Mohs scale hardness: 2–2 1/2
- Luster: Silky, pearly, dull, earthy
- Streak: White
- Diaphaneity: Transparent, translucent
- Specific gravity: 3.5–4
- Optical properties: Biaxial (−)
- Refractive index: n_{α} = 1.630 n_{β} = 1.642 n_{γ} = 1.750
- Birefringence: δ = 0.120
- 2V angle: Measured: 40°, calculated: 40°
- Dispersion: relatively strong
- Ultraviolet fluorescence: Fluoresces pale blue to lilac under UV
- Solubility: Readily soluble in acids.

Hydrozincite, also known as zinc bloom or marionite, is a white carbonate mineral consisting of Zn_{5}(CO_{3})_{2}(OH)_{6}. It is usually found in massive rather than crystalline form.

It occurs as an oxidation product of zinc ores and as post mine incrustations. It occurs associated with smithsonite, hemimorphite, willemite, cerussite, aurichalcite, calcite and limonite.

It was first described in 1853 for an occurrence in Bad Bleiberg, Carinthia, Austria and named for its chemical content.
