= Mckelveyite-(Y) =

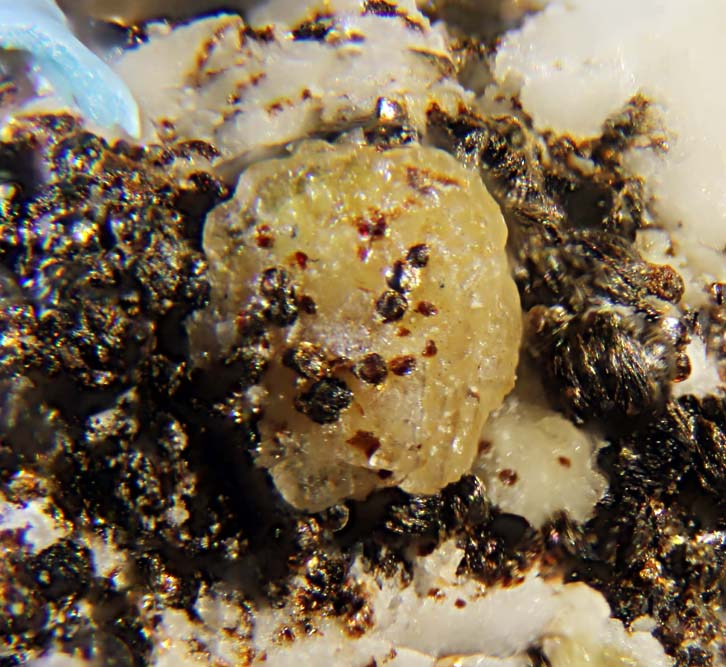
- Mckelveyite-(Y) found in Canada

General
- Category: Carbonate mineral
- Formula: Ba_{3}Na(Ca,U)Y(CO_{3})_{6}·3H_{2}O
- IMA symbol: Mkv-Y
- Strunz classification: 5.CC.05
- Crystal system: Triclinic
- Crystal class: Pedial (1) (same H-M symbol)
- Space group: P1
- Unit cell: a = 9.170(3) Å, b = 9.169(3) Å, c = 7.075(2) Å; α = 102.50(3)°, β = 115.63(3)°, γ = 59.99(3)°; Z = 1

Identification
- Color: Lime-yellow, greenish gray, reddish brown, may be black from contained organic material
- Crystal habit: Tabular, pyramidal
- Twinning: Threefold (pseudorhombohedral about {0001})
- Cleavage: Indistinct
- Mohs scale hardness: 3.5–4
- Luster: Vitreous, greasy, or dull
- Streak: White
- Diaphaneity: Transparent to opaque
- Specific gravity: 3.25
- Optical properties: Biaxial (−)
- Refractive index: n_{α} = 1.550–1.554 n_{β} = 1.550–1.554 n_{γ} = 1.649–1.658
- Birefringence: δ 0.0990–0.1040
- Pleochroism: Visible
- Other characteristics: Radioactive

Mckelveyite-(Y) is a hydrated sodium, barium, yttrium, and uranium–containing carbonate mineral, with the chemical formula Ba_{3}Na(Ca,U)Y(CO_{3})_{6}·3H_{2}O.

== Occurrence ==
It was first described in 1965 from deposits in the Green River Formation, Sweetwater County, Wyoming, and is named after Vincent Ellis McKelvey (1916–1985), a former director of the United States Geological Survey.

It occurs associate with trona layers in the Green River Formation of Wyoming and has been reported from an alkalic intrusive, the Khibiny Massif in the Kola Peninsula of Russia. It occurs in association with ewaldite, acmite, biotite, quartz, labuntsovite, searlesite and leucosphenite in the Green River Formation. In the Khibiny Massif it occurs with ewaldite, belovite-(Ce), fluorite, nenadkevichite, ancylite-(Ce), synchysite-(Ce), kukharenkoite-(Y), burbankite, calcite, barite and orthoclase. In the Khanneshin complex, Afghanistan it occurs with dolomite, calkinsite-(Ce), carbocernaite, khanneshite and barite. It has also been reported from the Mont Saint-Hilaire intrusive complex in Quebec.

A related neodymium-rich mineral, mckelveyite-(Nd) has been described for an occurrence in the Vuoriyarvi alkaline-ultrabasic massif on the Kola Peninsula. However, the mineral has not been approved by the IMA.

== See also ==
- List of minerals
- List of minerals named after people
