= Sheldrickite =

General
- Category: carbonates
- Formula: NaCa_{3}(CO_{3})_{2}F_{3}·(H_{2}O)
- IMA symbol: Sdk
- Strunz classification: V/C.06-27
- Dana classification: 16a.3.11.1
- Crystal system: Trigonal
- Unit cell: a = 6.726 Å; c = 15.05 Å; Z = 3

Identification
- Formula mass: 338.25 gm
- Color: colorless to white
- Crystal habit: Aggregates of blocky twinned crystals, radiating thin flakes and fibrous masses to 2mm.
- Twinning: By reflection on {001}
- Cleavage: parting on [001] good
- Fracture: uneven
- Tenacity: Brittle
- Mohs scale hardness: 3
- Luster: vitreous to silky
- Streak: white
- Specific gravity: 2.86
- Density: 2.86 g/cm^{3}
- Optical properties: Semitransparent

Sheldrickite is a sodium calcium carbonate fluoride mineral, named in honor of George M. Sheldrick, former Professor of Crystallography at the University of Göttingen in Germany. Sheldrick is the creator of SHELX computer program widely used for the analysis of crystal structures. Determination of the structure of this mineral required the software's capability of handling twinned crystals.

== Occurrence ==
Sheldrickite is a rare mineral found in Mont Saint-Hilaire, Canada. Mont Saint-Hilaire is an alkaline intrusive complex and one of the ten Monteregian Hills. A series of plutons is aligned along the St. Lawrence Valley for almost 150 km eastward from Oka to Megantic. Sheldrickite is closely associated with shortite (Na_{2}Ca_{2}(CO_{3})), with the crystals being found in a cavity between shortite crystals. Sheldrickite also occurs as flakes in thin seams between crystals of shortite. Sheldrickite is thought to be formed in a late-stage hydrothermal infilling. The associated species of Sheldrickite include pectolite, microcline, arfvedsonite, aegirine, polylithionite, calcite, fluorite and minor molybdenite, leucosphenite, thenardite, thermonatrite, sphalerite, galena, schairerite and kogarkoite.

== Physical and optical properties ==
Sheldrickite has 2 distinct habits, one occurs as a 1x1x2 mm aggregate of blocky twined crystals with 0.1x0.1x0.1 mm individuals. The second habit occurs as a radiating thin white silky flakes to fibrous masses up to 2 mm wide. Each habit was established as the same species by X-ray diffraction, infrared spectroscopy, and electron-microprobe data. This mineral is colorless to white, it has a white streak and a vitreous luster. It has a brittle uneven fracture and has good {001} parting. It has no fluorescence and has a Mohs hardness of 3, and a density of 2.86 +-0.04 g/cm^{2}.

== Crystallography ==
Sheldrickite is Trigonal-pyramidal with the space group being P3_{2}. This mineral has an axial ratio of 1:2.24025, with cell dimensions of a = 6.718 Å, c = 15.05 Å, Z = 3 Å; V = 588.23 Å. The precession photographs show sheldrickite to be hexagonal with a diffraction symmetry of 6/mmm, with space-group choices P6_{2}22 and P6_{4}22. After the solution of the crystal structure, it was shown that the actual symmetry of sheldrickite is trigonal, space group P3_{2} and the pseudohexagonal symmetry is due to merohedral twinning.

== Chemical composition ==
Oxide	wt%	Range
Na_{2}O	6.80	6.80-9.16
CaO	35.55	35.55-49.74
H_{2}O	.6	.6-5.33
CO_{2}	7.10	7.10-26.02
Oxygen	33.11	-
Fluorine	16.85	-
Total	100	100

== Structure ==
The structure of sheldrickite has four large-cation sites, but only two distinct types of polyhedral. The Sodium (Na) polyhedron, with its 8-fold coordination, fits the compressed octahedron that is modified by the removal of one edge. The compressed axis corresponds to the Na-F bonds, where the removed edge results in the four longer bonds in the polyhedron. Each of these three Calcium (Ca) sites has a similar stereochemistry and a similar polyhedron, in the nine-fold coordination. The polyhedron fits within the irregular trigonal prism, with the three Fluorine (F) atoms defining the equatorial plane and the other six ligands and the upper and lower face of the prism. The crystal structure of sheldrickite is layered on (001). In sheldrickite, there are two layers of different composition: (1) Na(CO_{3})_{2}·H_{2}O, and (2) CaF. The pseudo-m planes are positioned through the Na(CO_{3})_{2}·H_{2}O layers, and the pseudo-2-fold axis along [100] is at 0,0,0. The carbonate layer is the mixed-layer type and the standing on end (CO_{3}) groups are not in a separate layer but occur with the cations and H_{2}O groups. Sheldrickite structure is a combination of the bastnäsite - (Ce) structure with segregated large-cation layers and (CO_{3}) layers, and the cebaite - (Ce) structure with integrated large-cation and (CO_{3}) groups in the same layer. Sheldrickite has a segregated large-cation layer and an integrated large cation - (H_{2}O) - (CO_{3}) layer.
