= Zellerite =

Carbonate mineral

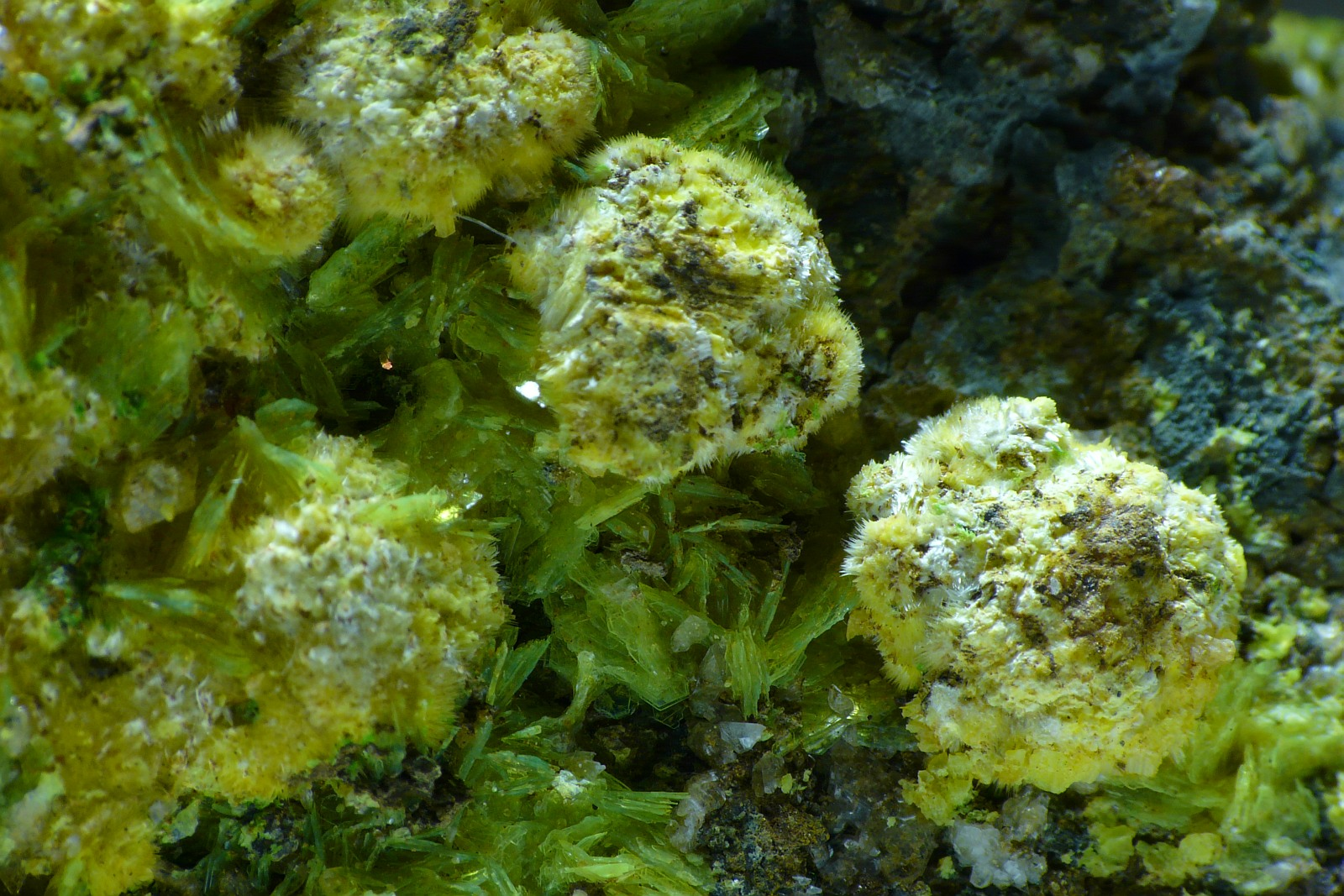

General
- Category: Minerals
- Formula: Ca(UO_{2})(CO_{3})_{2} · 5H_{2}O
- IMA symbol: Zel
- Strunz classification: 5.EC.10
- Dana classification: 15.3.1.1
- Crystal system: Orthorhombic
- Crystal class: H-M symbol: 2/m 2/m 2/m or mm2
- Space group: Pmmm or Pmn2_{1}
- Unit cell: 1,064.81

Identification
- Color: White yellow, light lemon-yellow, lemon
- Crystal habit: Acicular
- Cleavage: One
- Mohs scale hardness: 2
- Luster: Dull
- Streak: White
- Diaphaneity: Transparent, translucent
- Specific gravity: 3.25
- Density: 3.25
- Optical properties: Biaxial (+)
- Refractive index: n_{α} = 1.536 n_{β} = 1.559 n_{γ} = 1.697
- Birefringence: 0.161
- 2V angle: Measured: 30°- 45° Calculated: 48°
- Dispersion: Weak r > v
- Ultraviolet fluorescence: SW and LW; Green patches
- Other characteristics: Radioactive

Zellerite is a uranium mineral, named after its discoverer, geologist Howard Davis Zeller. It has a type locality of the Lucky MC uranium mine in Wyoming, USA. It was approved by the IMA in 1965, but was first published a year after its approval.

== Properties ==
Zellerite is a dimorph of meyrowitzite. It is a uranyl carbonate. It is an acicular mineral, and occurs in crystals that resemble the shape of needles. It can occur as fine hairlike fibers as well. The size of each crystal is up to 2 mm, and it grows in roughly radial aggregates, veinlets, and incrustations. Elongation is possible. It has pleochroic attributes, which is an optical phenomenon. Depending on which axis the specimen is being inspected, it can occur as it changes color. Upon being inspected on the x or y axis, the mineral can seem to be colorless, but on the z axis, it is seen in a pale yellow color. The mineral also shows luminescence. Under both a short wave and a long wave ultraviolet light, it fluoresces in green patches., which is typical for Uranium compounds. The fully hydrated form of the mineral is lemon yellow, but in transmitted light, it has a very pale yellow color. The dehydrated version of the mineral is called metazellerite.

Zellerite is also radioactive: the concentration of the mineral per Gamma Ray American Petroleum Institute Units is 280.20, due to it consisting of 45.76% uranium. The remaining constituents are oxygen (39.98%), calcium (7.70%), carbon (4.62%) and hydrogen (1.94%). This rare mineral forms in the weathering zone as an oxidation product of uraninite-coffinite, in the presence of an oxidizing pyrite, where the pH is greater than 7 and the partial pressure of carbon dioxide is greater than the atmosphere's. It is associated with metazellerite, gypsum, uranophane, meta-autunite, schoepite, iron sulfides, limonite and opal.
