= Kambaldaite =

Carbonate mineral

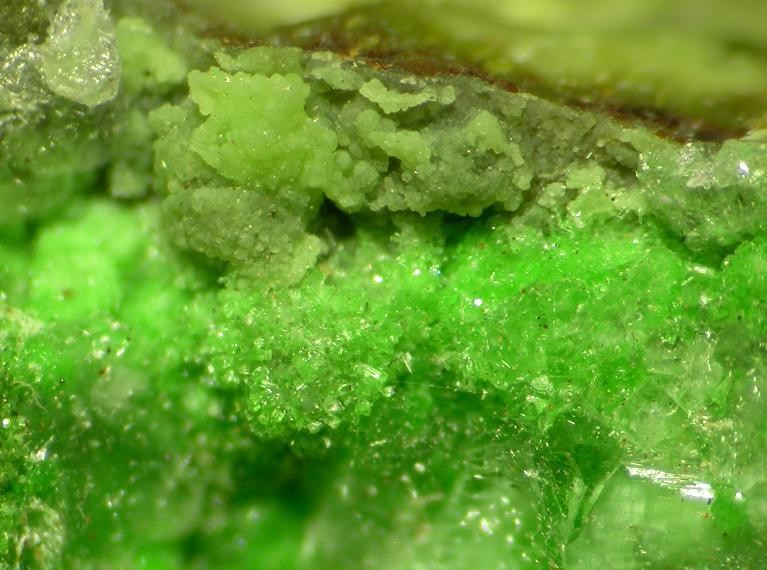
- Kambaldaite and some gaspeite (light green waxy)

General
- Category: Carbonate minerals
- Formula: NaNi_{4}(CO_{3})_{3}(OH)_{3}·3H_{2}O
- IMA symbol: Kbd
- Strunz classification: 5.DA.20
- Crystal system: Hexagonal
- Crystal class: Pyramidal (6); H-M symbol: (6)
- Space group: P6_{3}

Identification
- Color: Green

Kambaldaite, NaNi_{4}(CO_{3})_{3}(OH)_{3}·3H_{2}O, is an extremely rare hydrated sodium nickel carbonate mineral described from gossaniferous material associated with Kambalda type komatiitic nickel ore deposits at Kambalda, Western Australia, and Widgie Townsite nickel gossan, Widgiemooltha, Western Australia.

Kambaldaite crystallizes in the hexagonal system, is light green to blue, and forms drusy to mammilla encrustations on the matrix.

Kambaldaite was first described in 1985 from the gossan of the Otter Shoot nickel orebody, Kambalda, during mining of the gossans material. Kambaldaite, though in lesser and rarer amount, is also found in the Widgiemooltha nickel gossans, probably discovered there in the early to mid-1990s.

== Paragenesis ==
Kambaldaite is formed in the regolith as a supergene alteration mineral of nickel sulfide minerals, in arid or semi-arid environments which produce conditions amenable to a concentration of calcareous or carbonate minerals in the weathering profile.

Kambaldaite from Kambalda and Widgiemooltha is associated with komatiite-associated nickel sulfide gossans and is probably formed by substitution of nickel into carbonates such as magnesite which are formed by oxidation of the lithology, and oxidation of primary and supergene nickel sulfide minerals.

Kambaldaite is formed from a similar process to the weathering of other sulfide minerals to form carbonate minerals. The sulfide minerals which are weathered to produce kambaldaite are pentlandite, violarite, millerite and rarely nickeline.

== Occurrence ==
Kambaldaite is associated with goethite, malachite, annabergite, gaspeite and magnesite in the nickel sulfide gossans of Kambalda and Widgiemooltha. It is not known from other nickel sulfide gossans within the Yilgarn craton, potentially due to many of these existing within areas of laterite cover, deeper regolith development, or less favorable rainfall conditions.

Kambaldaite has not reported from the Tasmanian or New South Wales nickel carbonate occurrences because it is a supergene carbonate mineral and not a hydrothermal mineral.

Kambaldaite is also reported from the Inn valley, North Tyrol, Austria, and from Linopolis, Minas Gerais, Brazil.

== See also ==
- Gaspeite
- Hellyerite
- Gossan
