= Hellyerite =

Carbonate mineral

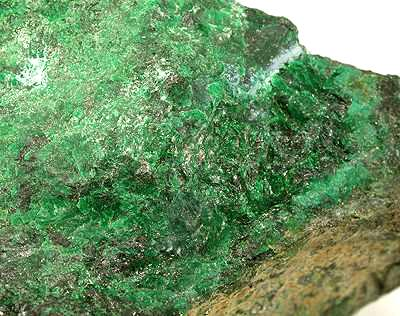
- Zaratite (emerald-green coating), hellyerite (powder-blue) and heazlewoodite (light bronze)

General
- Category: Carbonate mineral
- Formula: NiCO_{3}·5.5(H_{2}O)
- IMA symbol: Hy
- Strunz classification: 5.CA.20
- Crystal system: Monoclinic
- Crystal class: Prismatic (2/m) (same H-M symbol)
- Space group: C2/c
- Unit cell: a = 10.77, b = 7.29 c = 18.68 [Å]; β = 94°: Z = 8

Identification
- Color: Pale blue
- Crystal habit: As crystal fragments and microcrystalline coatings
- Twinning: Fine lamellar parallel to cleavage
- Cleavage: One perfect, two good at 112° to each other and perpendicular to the perfect cleavage
- Mohs scale hardness: 2.5
- Luster: Vitreous
- Diaphaneity: Semitransparent
- Specific gravity: 1.97
- Optical properties: Biaxial (−)
- Refractive index: n_{α} = 1.455 n_{β} = 1.503 n_{γ} = 1.549
- Birefringence: δ = 0.094
- Pleochroism: X = Y = very pale greenish blue; Z = pale greenish blue
- 2V angle: Measured: 85°
- Alters to: Decomposes on air exposure

Hellyerite, NiCO_{3}·6(H_{2}O), is a hydrated nickel carbonate mineral. It is light blue to bright green in colour, has a hardness of 2.5, a vitreous luster, a white streak and crystallises in the monoclinic system. The crystal habit is as platy and mammillary encrustations on its matrix. It is a pentahydrate according to X-ray crystallography. The solid consists of [Ni_{2}(CO_{3})_{2}(H_{2}O)_{8}] subunits with an extra pair of water of hydration.

== Occurrence ==
The environment of formation, associated only with metamorphosed ultramafic rocks, is diagnostic compared with gaspeite, another nickel carbonate which is associated with supergene weathering of nickel sulfides.

Hellyerite is observed forming in shear planes in serpentinite, produced by carbonation of the serpentinite. Hellyerite forms in this environment in nickel rich serpentinites, which are metamorphosed equivalents of ultramafic cumulate rocks such as peridotite and dunite. Peridotite and dunite, when fresh, can contain up to ~4,000 ppm nickel within olivine.

It was first identified in 1958 in the Old Lord Brassy mine, Tasmania, Australia and named after Henry Hellyer (1791–1832), Chief Surveyor of the Van Diemens Land Company. It is also reported from the Pafuri nickel deposit in Limpopo Province, South Africa.
