= Astrocyanite-(Ce) =

Bright blue mineral

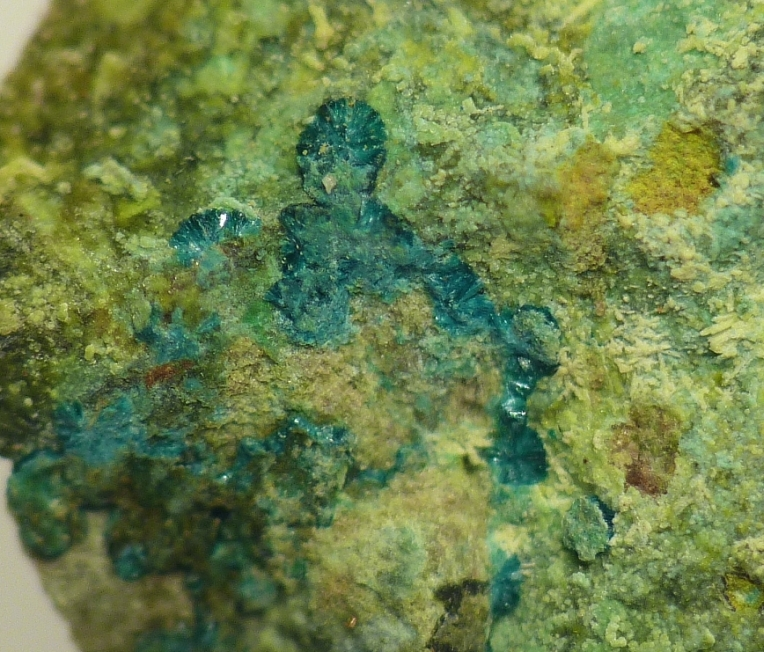
- Astrocyanite-(Ce) found at its type locality

General
- Category: Minerals
- Formula: Cu_{2}(Ce,Nd,La)_{2}(UO_{2})(CO_{3})_{5}(OH)_{2}·1.5H_{2}O
- IMA symbol: Acy-Ce

Identification
- Color: Blue, Bright blue, Blue green
- Specific gravity: 3.8
- Density: 3.8
- Other characteristics: Radioactive

Astrocyanite-(Ce) is a bright blue mineral with the chemical formula Cu_{2}(Ce,Nd,La)_{2}(UO_{2})(CO_{3})_{5}(OH)_{2}·1.5H_{2}O. Its type locality is Kamoto East Open Cut, Kamoto, Kolwezi, Lualaba, Congo

The name of this mineral comes from the Ancient Greek: άστρον ("astron") for "star", κυανός ("kyanos") for "blue", in allusion to its colour and habit of the aggregates, and the dominant lanthanide element in its composition.
