= Gaspéite =

Nickel carbonate mineral

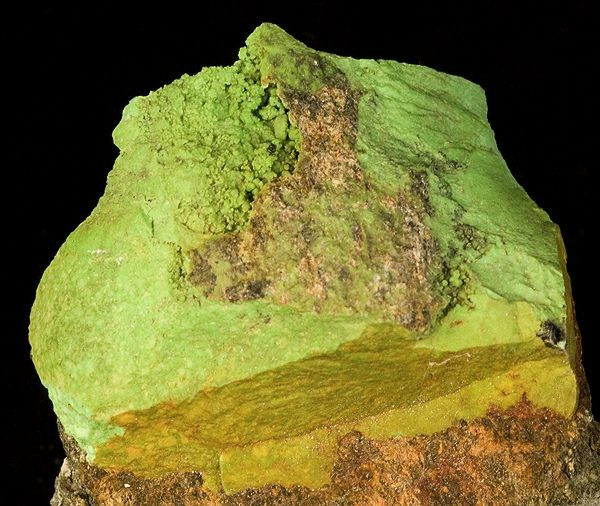

General
- Category: Carbonate mineral, anhydrous subgroup
- Formula: (Ni,Fe,Mg)CO_{3}
- IMA symbol: Gpé
- Strunz classification: 5.AB.05
- Dana classification: 14.01.01.08; Calcite group
- Crystal system: Trigonal
- Crystal class: Hexagonal scalenohedral (3̅m); H-M symbol: (3̅ 2/m)
- Space group: R3̅c

Identification
- Color: Pale green, light grass or apple green
- Crystal habit: Rhombic crystal aggregates, nodular concretions (botryoidal), massive
- Cleavage: {101̅1} Good
- Fracture: Uneven
- Mohs scale hardness: 4.5 - 5
- Luster: Vitreous to dull
- Streak: Yellow green
- Diaphaneity: Translucent
- Specific gravity: 3.71
- Optical properties: Uniaxial (-)
- Refractive index: n_{ω} = 1.830 n_{ε} = 1.610
- Birefringence: δ = 0.220
- Solubility: HCl soluble
- Other characteristics: Weakly magnetic

Gaspéite, a very rare nickel carbonate mineral, with the formula (Ni,Fe,Mg)CO_{3}, is named for the place it was first described, in the Gaspé Peninsula, Québec, Canada.

Gaspéite is the nickel rich member of the calcite group. A solid solution series exists between all members of this group with divalent cations readily exchanged within the common crystal structure. It forms massive to reniform papillary aggregates in fractures, botryoidal concretions in laterite or fracture infill. It is also present as stains and patinas on iron oxide boxworks of gossaniferous material.

== Paragenesis ==
Gaspéite is formed in the regolith as a supergene enrichment mineral of hypogene nickel sulfide minerals, generally in arid or semi-arid environments which produce conditions amenable to concentration of calcareous or carbonate minerals in the weathering profile.

Gaspéite from Widgiemooltha is associated with talc carbonated komatiite-associated nickel sulfide gossans and is probably formed by substitution of nickel into carbonates such as magnesite which are formed by oxidation of the talc-carbonate lithology, and of primary and supergene nickel sulfide minerals.

Gaspéite is formed from a similar process to the weathering of other sulfide minerals to form carbonate minerals. The sulfide minerals which are weathered to produce gaspéite are pentlandite, violarite, millerite and rarely nickeline.

== Occurrence ==
Gaspéite is known from a handful of locations worldwide. Aside from its type locality in Canada, gaspéite is found in the nickeliferous gossans of Kambalda type komatiitic nickel ore deposits in Kambalda, and nearby Widgie Townsite, Widgiemooltha, both south of Kalgoorlie, Western Australia, in both locations also associated with garnierite and kambaldaite.

Nickel carbonate, though not conclusively proven to be gaspéite, is also reported in hydrothermally altered ultramafic rocks in New South Wales, Australia, associated with serpentinite bodies and lode gold deposits.

Gaspéite is reported from the Lord Brassey Mine, Tasmania, in association with hellyerite.

== Uses ==
Gaspéite presence in the geologic environment may be used as an ore mining indicator of nickel rich minerals nearby.

Gaspéite stones are used for carving ornamental objects and animal figurines, and are also cut and polished into attractive apple green color (often veined) cabochons for jewelry use.
