= Liebigite =

Uranium carbonate mineral

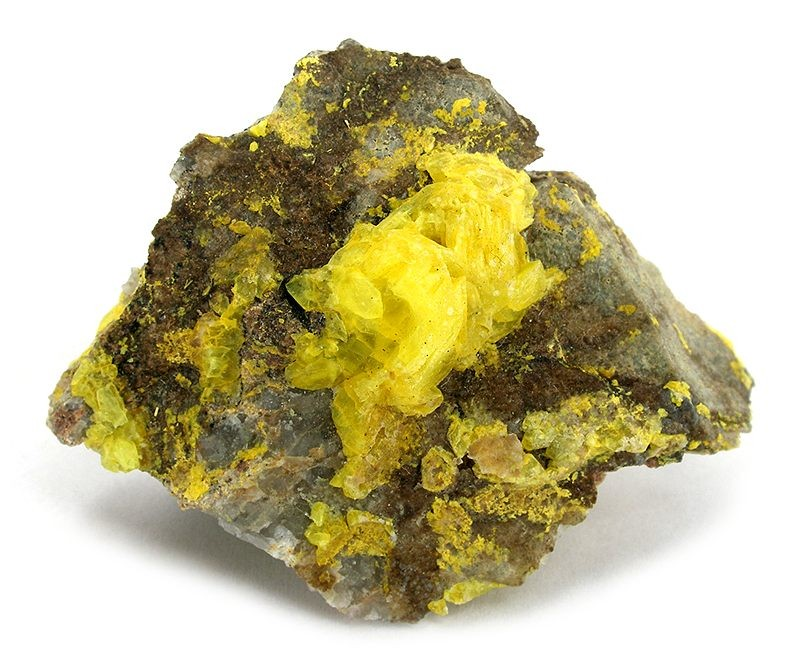
- Liebigite crystals from the Ralston Buttes District, Jefferson County, Colorado

General
- Category: Carbonate mineral
- Formula: Ca_{2}(UO_{2})(CO_{3})_{3}·11H_{2}O
- IMA symbol: Lbi
- Strunz classification: 5.ED.20
- Crystal system: Orthorhombic
- Crystal class: Pyramidal (mm2) (same H-M symbol)
- Space group: Bba2
- Unit cell: a = 16.699, b = 17.557 c = 13.697 [Å]; Z = 8

Identification
- Colour: Green to yellowish-green
- Crystal habit: Rare as short prismatic crystals; scaly or granular, in aggregates, crusts, and films
- Cleavage: Distinct on {100}
- Tenacity: Brittle
- Mohs scale hardness: 2 1/2 – 3
- Lustre: Vitreous, pearly
- Diaphaneity: Transparent, translucent
- Specific gravity: 2.41
- Optical properties: Biaxial (+)
- Refractive index: n_{α} = 1.497 n_{β} = 1.502 n_{γ} = 1.539
- Birefringence: δ = 0.042
- Pleochroism: Visible: X = nearly colourless Y = Z = light yellowish green
- 2V angle: 37° to 42°
- Ultraviolet fluorescence: Strong green to blue-green under short and long wave UV
- Other characteristics: Radioactive

Liebigite is a uranium carbonate mineral with the chemical formula: Ca_{2}(UO_{2})(CO_{3})_{3}·11H_{2}O. It is a secondary mineral occurring in the oxidizing zone of uranium-bearing ores. It is green to yellow green in colour. It has a Mohs hardness of about 3. Liebigite, like some other uranium minerals, is fluorescent under UV light and is also translucent. It crystallizes in the orthorhombic system, but only rarely forms distinct crystals. It typically forms encrustations or granular aggregates.

It was first described in 1848 for an occurrence in Adrianople, Edirne Province, Marmara region, Turkey. It was named for German chemist Justus von Liebig (1803–1873).
