= Schröckingerite =

Radioactive yellow uranium-containing carbonate mineral

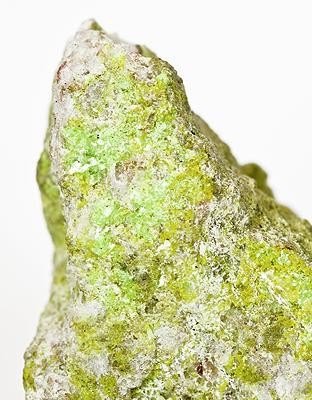

General
- Category: Carbonate minerals
- Formula: NaCa_{3}(UO_{2})[F|(CO_{3})_{3}(SO_{4})]·10(H_{2}O)
- IMA symbol: Srö
- Strunz classification: 5.EG.05
- Crystal system: Triclinic
- Crystal class: Pinacoidal (1̅) (same H-M symbol)
- Space group: P1̅

Identification
- Other characteristics: Radioactive

Schröckingerite is a radioactive yellow uranium-containing carbonate mineral, hydrated sodium calcium uranyl sulfate carbonate fluoride. Schröckingerite crystallizes in the orthorhombic system, occurring as globular clusters, and fluoresces yellow-green under ultraviolet light.

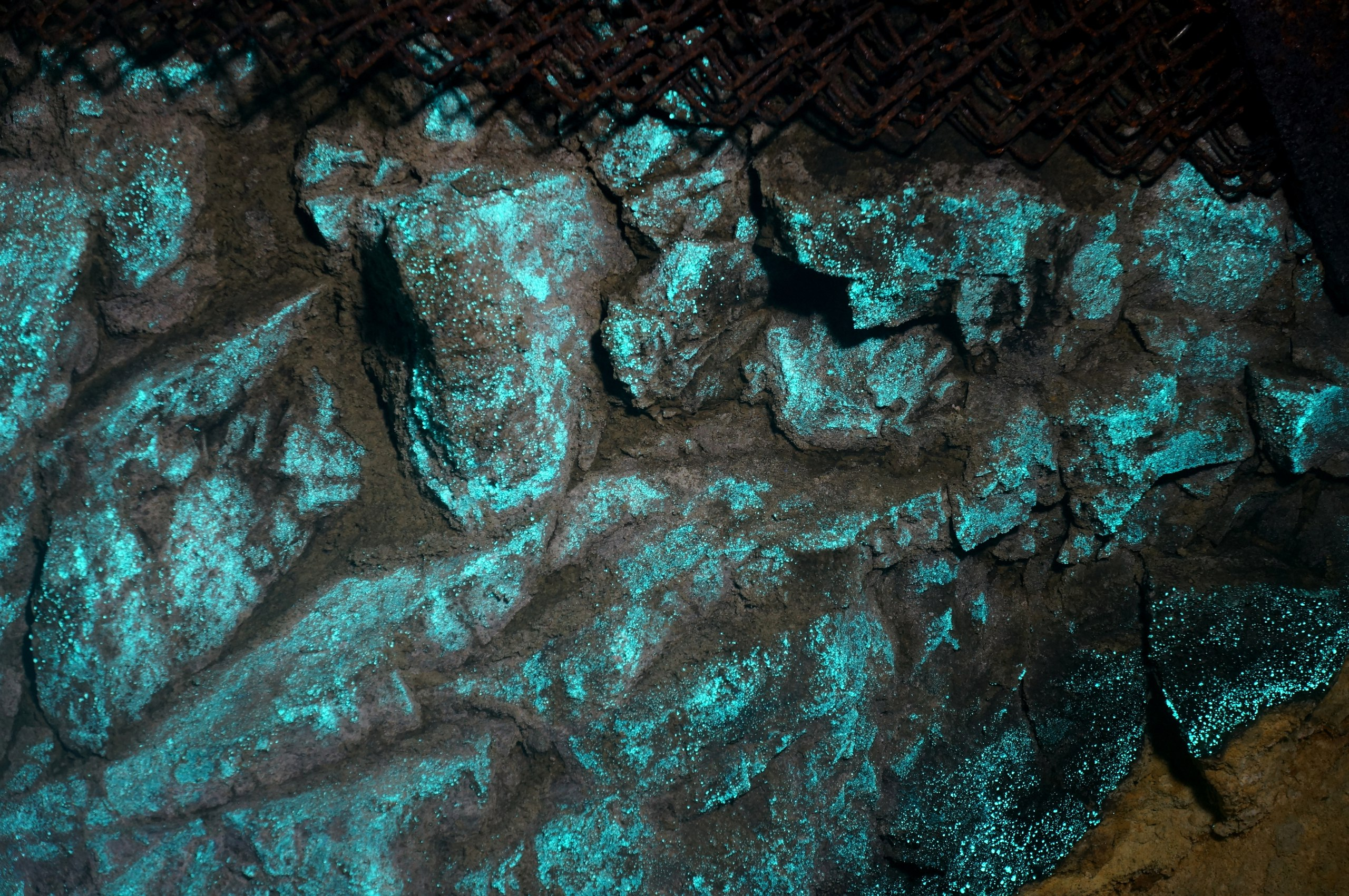
Schröckingerite in UV-light

Schröckingerite was first described in 1783 from an occurrence in Jáchymov, Bohemia, Czech Republic, and named for its discoverer, Julius Freiherr Schröckinger von Neudenberg (1814–1882).
