= Fluorocarbonate =

Class of chemical compounds

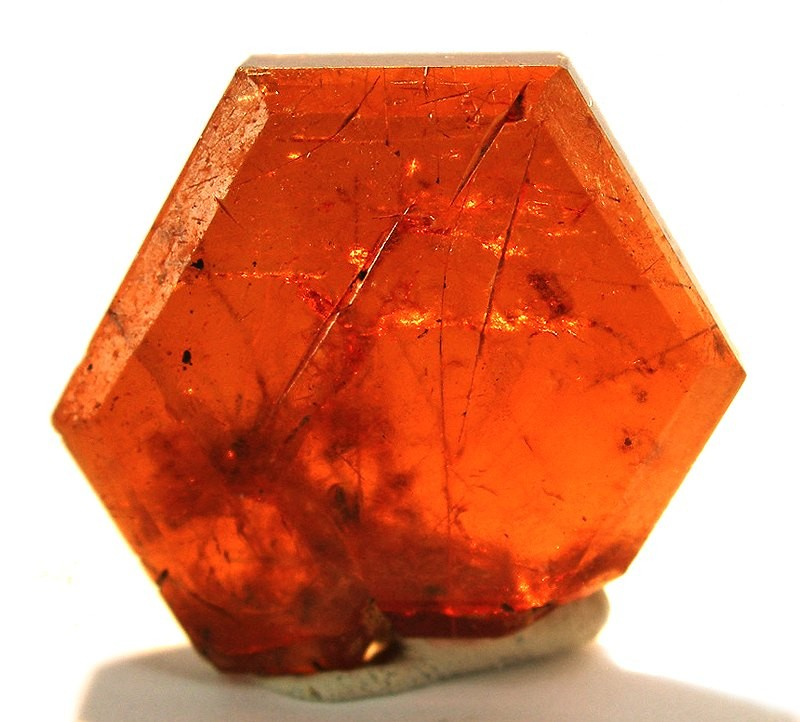
An example of a fluorocarbonate: bastnäsite from Zagi Mountain, Federally Administered Tribal Areas, Pakistan. Size: 1.5×1.5×0.3 cm.

A carbonate fluoride, fluoride carbonate, fluorocarbonate or fluocarbonate is a double salt containing both carbonate and fluoride. The salts are usually insoluble in water, and can have more than one kind of metal cation to make more complex compounds. Rare-earth fluorocarbonates are particularly important as ore minerals for the light rare-earth elements lanthanum, cerium and neodymium. Bastnäsite is the most important source of these elements. Other artificial compounds are under investigation as non-linear optical materials and for transparency in the ultraviolet, with effects over a dozen times greater than Potassium dideuterium phosphate.

Related to this there are also chlorocarbonates and bromocarbonates. Along with these fluorocarbonates form the larger family of halocarbonates. In turn halocarbonates are a part of mixed anion materials. Compounds where fluorine connects to carbon making acids are unstable, fluoroformic acid decomposes to carbon dioxide and hydrogen fluoride, and trifluoromethyl alcohol also breaks up at room temperature. Trifluoromethoxide compounds exist but react with water to yield carbonyl fluoride.

== Structures ==
M^{I}	M^{II}	M^{III}	Charge	CO_{3}	F
3			3	1	1
		1	3	1	1
1	1		3	1	1
1		1	4	1	2
	2		4	1	2
2		1	5	2	1
	1	1	5	1	3
1	2		5	1	3
3		1	6	2	2
4		1	7	3	1
			7	2	3
	2	1	7	1	5
	1	2	8	3	2
	3	1	9	1	7
	3	2	12	5	2
	2	3	13	5	3

The structure of the carbonate fluorides is mainly determined by the carbonate anion, as it is the biggest component. The overall structure depends on the ratio of carbonate to everything else, i.e. number (metals and fluorides)/number of carbonates. For ratios from 1.2 to 1.5 the carbonates are in a flat dense arrangement. From 1.5 to 2.3 the orientation is edge on. From 2.5 to 3.3 the arrangement is flat open. With a ratio from 4 to 11, the carbonate arrangement is flat-lacunar.

The simplest formula is LnCO_{3}F, where Ln has a 3+ charge.

For monocations there is A_{3}CO_{3}F, where A is a large ion such as K, Rb or Tl.

For M = alkali metal, and Ln = lanthanide: MLnCO_{3}F_{2} 1:1:1:2; M_{3}Ln(CO_{3})_{2}F_{2} 3:1:2:2; M_{2}Ln(CO_{3})_{2}F 2:1:2:1; M_{4}Ln(CO_{3})_{2}F_{3}·H_{2}O 4:1:2:3; M_{4}Ln_{2}(CO_{3})_{3}F_{4} 2:3:3:4. M_{2}Ln(CO_{3})F_{2} 2:1:1:3.

For B = alkaline earth and Ln = lanthanide (a triple-charged ion) BLn(CO_{3})_{2}F 1:1:2:1; BLn_{2}(CO_{3})_{3}F_{2} 1:2:3:2 B_{2}Ln_{3}(CO_{3})_{5}F_{3} 2:3:5:3; B_{2}Ln(CO_{3})_{2}F_{3} 2:1:2:3; B_{2}Ln(CO_{3})F_{5} 2:1:1:5 B_{2}Ln(CO_{3})_{3}F 2:1:3:1; B_{3}Ln(CO_{3})F_{7} 3:1:1:7; B_{3}Ln_{2}(CO_{3})_{5}F_{2} 3:2:5:2.

For alkali with dication combinations: MB: MBCO_{3}F MB_{3}(CO_{3})_{2}F_{3}·H_{2}O.

For dications A and B there is ABCO_{3}F_{2} with a degenerate case of A = B.

KPb_{2}(CO_{3})_{2}F is layered. Each layer is like a sandwich, with lead and carbonate in the outer sublayers, and potassium and fluoride in the inner layer. K_{2.70}Pb_{5.15}(CO_{3})_{5}F_{3} extends this structure with some of the layers also being a double-decker sandwich of carbonate, fluoride, carbonate, fluoride, carbonate.

In the rare-earth fluorocarbonates the environment for the rare-earth atoms is 9-coordinated. Six oxygen atoms from carbonate are at the apices of a trigonal prism, and fluoride ions cap the rectangular faces of the prism.

== Formation ==
Carbonate fluoride compounds can be formed by a variety of related methods involving heating the precursor ingredients with or without water. Thallous fluoride carbonate was made simply by evaporating a fluoride thallium solution in ethanol and water in air. It absorbed sufficient carbon dioxide to yield the product. Most other carbonate fluorides are very insoluble and need high-temperature water to crystallise from. Supercritical water heated between 350 and 750 °C under pressures around 200 bars can be used. A sealed platinum tube can withstand the heat and pressure. Crystallisation takes about a day. With subcritical water around 200 °C, crystallisation takes about 2 days. This can happen in a teflon-coated pressure autoclave. The starting ingredients can be rare-earth fluorides and alkali carbonates. The high pressure is needed to keep the water liquid and the carbon dioxide under control, otherwise it would escape. If the fluoride levels are low, hydroxide can substitute for the fluoride. Solid-state reactions require even higher temperatures.

Bastnäsite along with lukechangite (and petersenite) can be precipitated from a mixed solution of CeCl_{3}, NaF, and NaOH with carbon dioxide. Another way to make the simple rare-earth fluorocarbonates is to precipitate a rare-earth carbonate from a nitrate solution with ammonium bicarbonate and then add fluoride ions with hydrofluoric acid (HF).

Pb_{2}(CO_{3})F_{2} can be made by boiling a water solution of lead nitrate, sodium fluoride and potassium carbonate in a 2:2:1 molar ratio.

== Properties ==
structure	carbonate vibration, cm^{−1}			
	ν_{1}	ν_{2}	ν_{3}	ν_{4}
bastnäsite	1086	868	1443	728
synchysite				
parisite	1079 1088	870	1449	734 746
KCdCO_{3}F		853	1432	
RbCdCO_{3}F		843	1442	

The visible spectrum of fluorocarbonates is determined mainly by the cations contained. Different structures only have slight effect on the absorption spectrum of rare-earth elements. The visible spectrum of the rare-earth fluorocarbonates is almost entirely due to narrow absorption bands from neodymium. In the near infrared around 1000 nm there are some absorption lines due to samarium and around 1547 nm are some absorption features due to praseodymium. Deeper into the infrared, bastnäsite has carbonate absorption lines at 2243, 2312 and 2324 nm. Parisite only has a very weak carbonate absorption at 2324 nm, and synchysite absorbs at 2337 nm.

The infrared spectrum due to vibration of carbon–oxygen bonds in carbonate is affected by how many kinds of position there are for the carbonate ions.

== Reactions ==
An important chemical reaction used to prepare rare-earth elements from their ores, is to roast concentrated rare-earth fluorocarbonates with sulfuric acid at about 200 °C. This is then leached with water. This process liberates carbon dioxide and hydrofluoric acid and yields rare-earth sulfates:

2 LnCO_{3}F + 3 H_{2}SO_{4} → Ln_{2}(SO_{4})_{3} + 2 HF + 2 H_{2}O + 2 CO_{2}.

Subsequent processing precipitates a double sulfate with sodium sulfate at about 50 °C. The aim is to separate out the rare-earth elements from calcium, aluminium, iron and thorium.

At high enough temperatures the carbonate fluorides lose carbon dioxide, e.g.

KCu(CO_{3})F → CuO + KF + CO_{2}

at 340 °C.

The processing of bastnäsite is important, as it is the most commonly mined cerium mineral. When heated in air or oxygen at over 500 °C, bastnäsite oxidises and loses volatiles to form ceria (CeO_{2}). Lukechangite also oxidises to ceria and sodium fluoride (NaF). Ce_{7}O_{12} results when heated to over 1000 °C.

2 Ce(CO_{3}F) + O_{2} → 2 CeO_{2} + 2 CO_{2} + F_{2}
Na_{3}Ce_{2}(CO_{3}F)_{4}F + 1/2 O_{2} → 2 CeO_{2} + 3 CO_{2} + NaF + Na_{2}CO_{3}

At 1300 °C Na_{2}CO_{3} loses CO_{2}, and between 1300 and 1600 °C NaF and Na_{2}O boil off.

When other rare-earth carbonate fluorides are heated, they lose carbon dioxide and form an oxyfluoride:

LaCO_{3}F → LaOF + CO_{2}

In some rare-earth extraction processes, the roasted ore is then extracted with hydrochloric acid to dissolve rare earths apart from cerium. Cerium is dissolved if the pH is under 0, and thorium is dissolved if it is under 2.

KCdCO_{3}F when heated yields cadmium oxide (CdO) and potassium fluoride (KF).

When lanthanum fluorocarbonate is heated in a hydrogen sulfide, or carbon disulfide vapour around 500 °C, lanthanum fluorosulfide forms:

LaCO_{3}F + 1/2 CO_{2} → LaSF + 1.5 CO_{2}

Note that this also works for other lanthanides apart from cerium.

When lanthanum carbonate fluoride is heated at 1000 °C with alumina, lanthanum aluminate is produced:

LaCO_{3}F + 2 Al_{2}O_{3} → LaAlO_{3} + CO_{2} + equiv AlOF

Within the hot part of the Earth's crust, rare-earth fluorocarbonates should react with apatite to form monazite.

== Minerals ==
Some rare-earth fluorocarbonate minerals exist. They make up most of the economic ores for light rare-earth elements (LREE). These probably result from hydrothermal liquids from granite that contained fluoride. Rare-earth fluorocarbonate minerals can form in bauxite on carbonate rocks, as rare-earth fluoride complexes react with carbonate. Carbonate fluoride compounds of rare-earth elements also occur in carbonatites.

name	formula	pattern	formula weight	crystal system	space group	unit cell	volume	density	comment	references
albrechtschraufite	MgCa_{4}(UO_{2})_{2}(CO_{3})_{6}F_{2}⋅17–18H_{2}O	0:7:0:14:6:2		triclinic	P1̅	a = 13.569, b = 13.419, c = 11.622 Å, α = 115.82, β = 107.61, γ = 92.84° Z=	1774.6	2.69		
aravaite	Ba_{2}Ca_{18}(SiO_{4})_{6}(PO_{4})_{3}(CO_{3})F_{3}O			trigonal	R3̅m	a = 7.1255, c = 66.290 Z=3	2914.8			
arisite-(Ce)	NaCe_{2}(CO_{3})_{2}[(CO_{3})_{1–x}F_{2x}]F				P6̅m2	a=5.1109 c=8.6713 Z=1	196.16	4.126	dissolves in dilute HCl	
barentsite	Na_{7}AlH_{2}(CO_{3})_{4}F_{4}	9:0:1:12:4:4	505.95		P1̅	a=6.472 b=6.735 c=8.806 92.50 β=97.33 119.32				
Bastnäsite	(Ce, La)CO_{3}F	0:0:1:2:1:1			P62m	a=7.094 c=4.859				
Bastnäsite-(La)	La(CO_{3})F	0:0:1:2:1:1	217.91		P62c					
Bastnäsite-(Nd)	Nd(CO_{3})F	0:0:1:2:1:1	223.25							
Brenkite	Ca_{2}(CO_{3})F_{2}	0:2:0:4:1:1	178.16	orthorhombic	Pbcn	a=7.650 b=7.550 c=6.548				
Cebaite	Ba_{3}(Nd,Ce)_{2}(CO_{3})_{5}F_{2}	0:3:2:12:5:2		Monoclinic		a=21.42 b=5.087 c=13.30 β=94.8°				
Cordylite = Baiyuneboite	NaBaCe_{2}(CO_{3})_{4}F	1:1:2:9:4:1	699.58		P6_{3}/mmc	a=5.1011 c=23.096				
Doverite	CaY(CO_{3})_{2}F	0:1:1:5:2:1	268.00							
Francolite										
Horvathite-Y (horváthite)	NaY(CO_{3})F_{2}	1:0:1:4:1:2	209.90		Pmcn	a=6.959 b=9.170 c=6.301				
Huanghoite-(Ce)	BaCe(CO_{3})_{2}F	0:1:1:5:2:1	416.46	Trigonal	R3̅m	a=5.072 c=38.46				
Kettnerite	CaBi(CO_{3})OF									
kukharenkoite-(Ce)	Ba_{2}Ce(CO_{3})_{3}F	0:2:1:7:3:1	613.80		P2_{1}/m	a=13.365 b=5.097 c=6.638 β=106.45				
Lukechangite-(Ce)	Na_{3}Ce_{2}(CO_{3})_{4}F	3:0:2:9:4:1	608.24		P6_{3}/mmc	a=5.0612 c=22.820				
lusernaite	Y_{4}Al(CO_{3})_{2}(OH,F)_{11}.6H_{2}O	0:0:5:15:2:11		Orthorhombic	Pmna	a=7.8412 b=11.0313 c=11.3870 Z=2	984.96			
Mineevite-(Y)	Na_{25}BaY_{2}(CO_{3})_{11}(HCO_{3})_{4}(SO_{4})_{2}F_{2}Cl		2059.62							
Montroyalite	Sr_{4}Al_{8}(CO_{3})_{3}(OH,F)_{26}.10-11H_{2}O									
Parisite	[LaF]_{2}Ca(CO_{3})_{3}	0:1:2:8:3:2	535.91	Rhombohedral	R3	a=7.124 c=84.1				
Parisite-(Ce)	[CeF]_{2}Ca(CO_{3})_{3}	0:1:2:8:3:2	538.33	monoclinic	Cc	a = 12.305 Å, b = 7.1056 Å, c = 28.2478 Å; β = 98.246°; Z = 12				
Podlesnoite	BaCa_{2}(CO_{3})_{2}F_{2}	0:3:0:6:2:2	375.50	Orthorhombic	Cmcm	a = 12.511 b=5.857 c=9.446 Z=4	692.2	3.614	named after Aleksandr Semenovich Podlesnyi 1948	
qaqarssukite-(Ce)	BaCe(CO_{3})_{2}F	0:1:1:5:2:1	416.46							
röntgenite-(Ce)	Ca_{2}Ce_{3}(CO_{3})_{5}F_{3}	0:2:3:13:5:3	857.54		R3	a=7.131 c=69.40				
rouvilleite	Na_{3}Ca_{2}(CO_{3})_{3}F	3:2:0:7:3:1	348.15		Cc	a=8.012 b=15.79 c=7.019 β =100.78				
Schröckingerite	NaCa_{3}(UO2)(CO_{3})_{3}F(SO_{4})·10H_{2}O	1:6:13:3:1+	888.49						also with sulfate	
Sheldrickite	NaCa_{3}(CO_{3})_{2}F_{3}·(H_{2}O)	1:3:0:7:2:3	338.25	Trigonal		a = 6.726 Å; c = 15.05 Å Z = 3		2.86		
stenonite	Sr_{2}Al(CO_{3})F_{5}	0:2:1:7:1:5	357.22		P2_{1}/n	a=5.450 b=8.704 c=13.150 β=98.72				
Synchysite	Ca(Ce,La)(CO_{3})_{2}F	0:1:1:5:2:1			C2/c	a=12.329 b=7.110 c=18.741 β=102.68				
Thorbastnäsite	CaTh(CO_{3})_{2}F_{2}.3H_{2}O				P6̅_{2}c	a = 6.99, c = 9.71 z=3	410.87		brown	
zhonghuacerite	Ba_{2}Ce(CO_{3})_{3}F	0:2:1:7:3:1	613.80	Monoclinic						

== Artificial ==
These are non-linear optical crystals in the AMCO_{3}F family KSrCO_{3}F KCaCO_{3}F RbSrCO_{3}F KCdCO_{3}F CsPbCO_{3}F RbPbCO_{3}F RbMgCO_{3}F KMgCO_{3}F RbCdCO_{3}F CsSrCO_{3}F RbCaCO_{3}F KZnCO_{3}F CsCaCO_{3}F RbZnCO_{3}F

formula	name	weight	crystal	space group	unit cell	volume	density	UV	thermal stability	properties	reference
		g/mol			Å	Å^{3}		nm	°C		
K_{2}(HCO_{3})F·H_{2}O	Dipotassium hydrogencarbonate fluoride monohydrate	176.24	monoclinic	P 2_{1}/m	a=5.4228 b=7.1572 c=7.4539 β=105.12 Z=2	279.28	2.096			transparent below 195 nm	
K_{3}(CO_{3})F		196.30		R3̅c	a=7.4181 c=16.3918						
KLi_{2}CO_{3}F		131.99	Hexagonal	P6_{3}222	a=4.8222 c=10.034 Z=2	202.06	2.169	190		SHG; transparent	
KMgCO_{3}F		142.42	Hexagonal	P62m	a=8.8437 c=3.9254 z=3	265.88	2.668	200			
Na_{3}Ca_{2}(CO_{3})_{3}F	rouvilleite	348.16	monoclinic	Cm	a=8.0892 b=15.900 c=3.5273 β=101.66 Z=2	444.32	2.602	190		white	
KCaCO_{3}F		158.18	Hexagonal	P6̅m2	a=5.10098 c=4.45608 Z=1	100.413	2.616			≤320 °C	
KCaCO_{3}F		158.18	Hexagonal	P6̅2m	a=9.1477 c=4.4169 Z=3	320.09	2.462			≥320 °C	
KMnCO_{3}F		173.04	Hexagonal	P6̅c2	a=5.11895 c=8.42020 Z=2	191.080	3.008				
KCuCO_{3}F		181.65									
NaZnCO_{3}F		167.37	hexagonal	P6̅2c	a=8.4461 c=15.550 Z=12	960.7	3.472				
Na_{3}Zn_{2}(CO_{3})_{3}F		398.74	monoclinic	C2/c	a=14.609 b=8.5274 c=20.1877 β=102.426 Z=12	2456.0	3.235	213	200		
KZnCO_{3}F		183.48	hexagonal	P6̅2c	a=5.0182 c=8.355 Z=2	182.21	3.344			colourless	
Rb_{3}(CO_{3})F		335.41		R3̅c	a=7.761 c=17.412						
RbCaCO_{3}F		204.56	hexagonal	P6̅2m	a=9.1979 c=4.4463 Z=3	325.77	3.128				
RbMgCO_{3}F		188.79	Hexagonal	P62m	a=9.0160 c=3.9403 z=3	277.39	3.39			colourless	
RbZnCO_{3}F		229.85	hexagonal	P6̅2c	a=5.1035 c=8.619 Z=2	194.4	3.926			white	
KRb_{2}(CO_{3})F		289.04		R3̅c	a=7.6462 c=17.1364						
K_{2}Rb(CO_{3})F		242.67		R3̅c	a=7.5225 c=16.7690						
KSrCO_{3}F		205.73	hexagonal	P6̅2m	a=5.2598 c=4.696 Z=1	112.50	3.037				
RbSrCO_{3}F		252.10	hexagonal	P6̅2m	a=5.3000 c=4.7900 Z=6	116.53	3.137				
KCdCO_{3}F		230.51	Hexagonal	P6̅m2	a=5.1324 c=4.4324 z=1	101.11	3.786	227	320	colourless	
RbCdCO_{3}F		276.88	hexagonal	P6̅m2	1=5.2101 c=4.5293 z=1	106.48			350	colourless	
Li_{2}RbCd(CO_{3})_{2}F			hexagonal	P6_{3}/m	a=4.915 c=15.45 Z=2,	323.3				colourless	
Cs_{9}Mg_{6}(CO_{3})_{8}F_{5}		1917.13	Orthorhombic	Pmn2_{1}	a=13.289 b=6.8258 c=18.824 z=2	1707.4	3.729	208			
CsCaCO_{3}F		252.00	hexagonal	P6̅2m	a=9.92999 c=4.5400 Z=3	340.05	3.692				
CsSrCO_{3}F		230.51	Hexagonal	P6̅m2	a=9.6286 c=4.7482 Z=3	381.2		<200	590		
KBa_{2}(CO_{3})_{2}F		452.8	trigonal	R3̅	a=10.119 c=18.60 Z=9	1648	4.106			colourless	
Ba_{3}Sc(CO_{3})F_{7}		649.91	Orthorhombic	Cmcm	a=11.519 b=13.456 c=5.974 Z=4	926.0	4.662			colourless	
BaMnCO_{3}F_{2}		290.27	Hexagonal	P6_{3}/m	a=4.9120, c=9.919 Z=2						
BaCoCO_{3}F_{2}		294.27									
Ba_{2}Co(CO_{3})_{2}F_{2}		491.60	Orthorhombic	Pbca	a=6.6226, b=11.494, c=9.021 and Z=4	686.7					
BaNiCO_{3}F_{2}		294.03									
BaCuCO_{3}F_{2}		298.88		Cmcm	a=4.889 b=8.539 c=9.588						
BaZnCO_{3}F_{2}		300.72	Hexagonal	P6_{3}/m	a=4.8523, c=9.854						
RbBa_{2}(CO_{3})_{2}F		499.19	trigonal	R3̅	a=10.2410 c=18.8277 Z=9	1710.1	4.362			colourless	
Ba_{2}Y(CO_{3})_{2}F_{3}		540.57		Pbcn	a=9.458 b=6.966 c=11.787						
Cs_{3}Ba_{4}(CO_{3})_{3}F_{5}		1223.12	hexagonal	P6_{3}mc	a=11.516 c=7.613 Z=2	874.4	4.646				
Na_{3}La_{2}(CO_{3})_{4}F	Lukechangite-(La)	605.81	Hexagonal	P6_{3}/mmc	a=5.083, c=23.034, Z=2						
Na_{2}Eu(CO_{3})F_{3}		314.94	Orthorhombic	Pbca	a=6.596 b=10.774 c=14.09 Z=8	1001.3	4.178				
Na_{2}Gd(CO_{3})F_{3}		320.24	orthorhombic		a=14.125 b=10.771 c=6.576 Z=8	1000.5	4.252	<200	250	colourless	
KGd(CO_{3})F_{2}		294.35	Orthorhombic	Fddd	a=7.006, b=11.181 and c=21.865						
K_{4}Gd_{2}(CO_{3})_{3}F_{4}		726.91		R32	a=9.0268 c=13.684						
BaSm(CO_{3})_{2}F		426.70		R3̅m	a=5.016 c=37.944						
Yb(CO_{3})(OH,F)·xH_{2}O											
NaYb(CO_{3})F_{2}		294.04			a=6.897, b=9.118, c=6.219					Horvathite structure	
Na_{2}Yb(CO_{3})_{2}F		358.04	monoclinic	C2/c	a=17.440, b=6.100, c=11.237, β=95.64° Z=8	1189.7					
Na_{3}Yb(CO_{3})_{2}F_{2}		400.02	monoclinic	Cc	a=7.127, b=29.916, c=6.928, β=112.56°; Z=8	1359					
Na_{4}Yb(CO_{3})_{3}F		464.03	monoclinic	Cc	a=8.018 b=15.929 c=13.950 β=101.425 Z=8	1746.4	3.53	263	300	nonlinear d_{eff}=1.28pm/V	
Na_{5}Yb(CO_{3})_{4}·2H_{2}O		564.05									
Na_{8}Lu_{2}(CO_{3})_{6}F_{2}		899.92	monoclinic	Cc	a=8.007 b=15.910 c=13.916 β=101.318 Z=4	1738	3.439		250		
Na_{3}Lu(CO_{3})_{2}F_{2}		401.96	monoclinic	Cc	a=7.073 b=29.77 c=6.909 β=111.92 Z=8	1349	3.957		220		
Na_{2}Lu(CO_{3})_{2}F		359.97	monoclinic	C2/m	a=17.534 b=6.1084 c=11.284 β=111.924 Z=8	1203.2	3.974				
Tl_{3}(CO_{3})F	thallous fluoride carbonate	692.16	Monoclinic	P2_{1}/m	a=7.510 b=7.407 c=6.069 γ=120° Z=2					hexagonal prisms	
Pb_{2}(CO_{3})F_{2}	lead carbonate fluoride	512.41	Orthorhombic	Pbcn	a=8.0836 b=8.309 c=6.841 Z=4	444.6	7.41				
NaPb_{2}(CO_{3})_{2}F_{0.9}(OH)_{0.1}			Hexagonal	P6_{3}/mmm	a=5.275 c=13.479 Z=2	325	5.893	<269	260	band gap 4.28 eV; high birefringence	
KPb_{2}(CO_{3})_{2}F		592.5	Hexagonal	P6_{3}/mmc	a=5.3000 c=13.9302 z=2	338.88	5.807		250	colourless	
K_{2.70}Pb_{5.15}(CO_{3})_{5}F_{3}		1529.65	Hexagonal	P-6m2	a= 5.3123 c=18.620 z=1	455.07	5.582		250	colourless non-linear piezoelectric	
K_{2}Pb_{3}(CO_{3})_{3}F_{2}		917.8	Hexagonal	P6_{3}/mmc	a=5.2989 c=23.2326 z=2	564.94	5.395	287		colourless	
RbPbCO_{3}F		371.67	Hexagonal	P6̅m2	a=5.3488 c=4.8269 Z=1	119.59	5.161			colourless mon-linear	
CsPbCO_{3}F		419.11	Hexagonal	P6̅m2	a=5.393 c=5.116 z=1	128.8	5.401			colourless non-linear	
BaPb_{2}(CO_{3})_{2}F_{2}		709.74		R3̅m	a=5.1865 c=23.4881						
