= Bastnäsite =

Family of minerals

Bastnäsite, bastnaesite
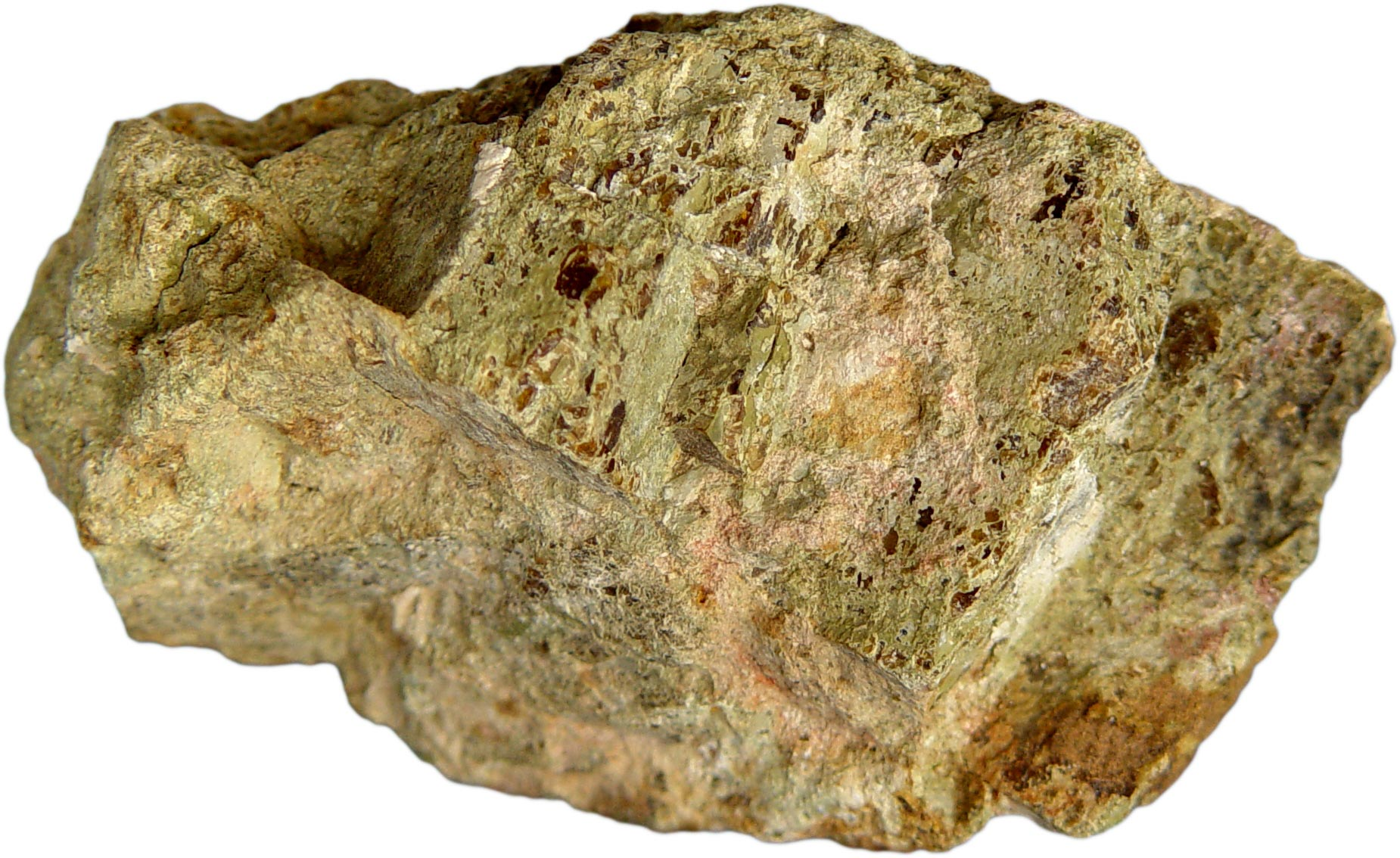
- Bastnäsite from Gakara Burundi

General
- Category: Carbonate mineral
- Formula: (La, Ce, Y)CO_{3}F
- IMA symbol: Bsn
- Strunz classification: 5.BD.20a
- Crystal system: Hexagonal
- Crystal class: Ditrigonal dipyramidal (6̅m2); H-M symbol: (6̅ m2)
- Space group: P6̅2c
- Unit cell: a = 7.118(1) Å, c = 9.762(1) Å; Z = 6 (bastnäsite-(Ce))

Identification
- Color: Honey-yellow, reddish brown
- Crystal habit: Tabular to equant striated crystals, deep grooves may resemble thin plates stack, oriented overgrowths, also granular, massive
- Twinning: Dauphine law, Brazil law and Japan law
- Cleavage: Imperfect to indistinct on {101̅0}, parting on {0001}
- Fracture: Uneven
- Tenacity: Brittle
- Mohs scale hardness: 4–5
- Luster: Vitreous, greasy, pearly on basal partings
- Streak: White
- Diaphaneity: Transparent to translucent
- Specific gravity: 4.95–5.0
- Optical properties: Uniaxial (+)
- Refractive index: n_{ω} = 1.717–1.722 n_{ε} = 1.818–1.823
- Birefringence: δ = 0.101 max.
- Pleochroism: Faint, E > O, colorless to pale yellow or orange
- Other characteristics: Strongly piezoelectric; dark red cathodoluminescence, Radioactive if uranium and/or thorium-rich

The mineral bastnäsite (or bastnaesite) is one of a family of three fluorocarbonate minerals, which includes bastnäsite-(Ce) with a formula of (Ce, La)CO_{3}F, bastnäsite-(La) with a formula of (La, Ce)CO_{3}F, and bastnäsite-(Y) with a formula of (Y, Ce)CO_{3}F. Some of the bastnäsites contain OH^{−} instead of F^{−} and receive the name of hydroxylbastnasite. Most bastnäsite is bastnäsite-(Ce), and cerium is by far the most common of the rare earths in this class of minerals. Bastnäsite and the phosphate mineral monazite are the two largest sources of cerium and other rare-earth elements.

Bastnäsite was first described by the Swedish chemist Wilhelm Hisinger in 1838. It is named for the Bastnäs mine near Riddarhyttan, Västmanland, Sweden. Bastnäsite also occurs as very high-quality specimens at the Zagi Mountains, Pakistan. Bastnäsite occurs in alkali granite and syenite and in associated pegmatites. It also occurs in carbonatites and in associated fenites and other metasomatites.

== Composition ==
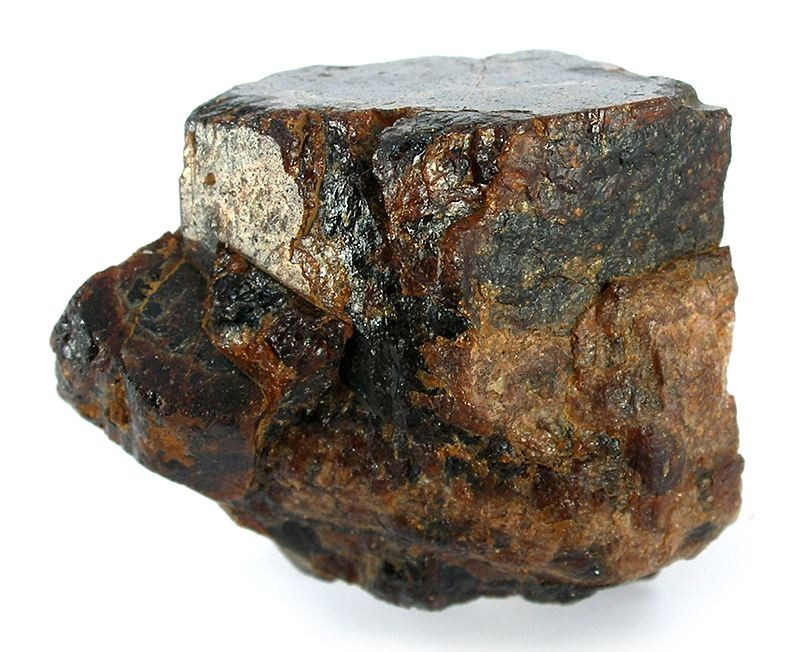
Bastnäsite crystal from the Manitou District, El Paso County, Colorado, USA (size: 4.3×3.8×3.3 cm)

Bastnäsite has cerium, lanthanum and yttrium in its generalized formula but officially the mineral is divided into three minerals based on the predominant rare-earth element. There is bastnäsite-(Ce) with a more accurate formula of (Ce, La)CO_{3}F. There is also bastnäsite-(La) with a formula of (La, Ce)CO_{3}F. And finally there is bastnäsite-(Y) with a formula of (Y, Ce)CO_{3}F. There is little difference in the three in terms of physical properties and most bastnäsite is bastnäsite-(Ce). Cerium in most natural bastnäsites usually dominates the others. Bastnäsite and the phosphate mineral monazite are the two largest sources of cerium, an important industrial metal.

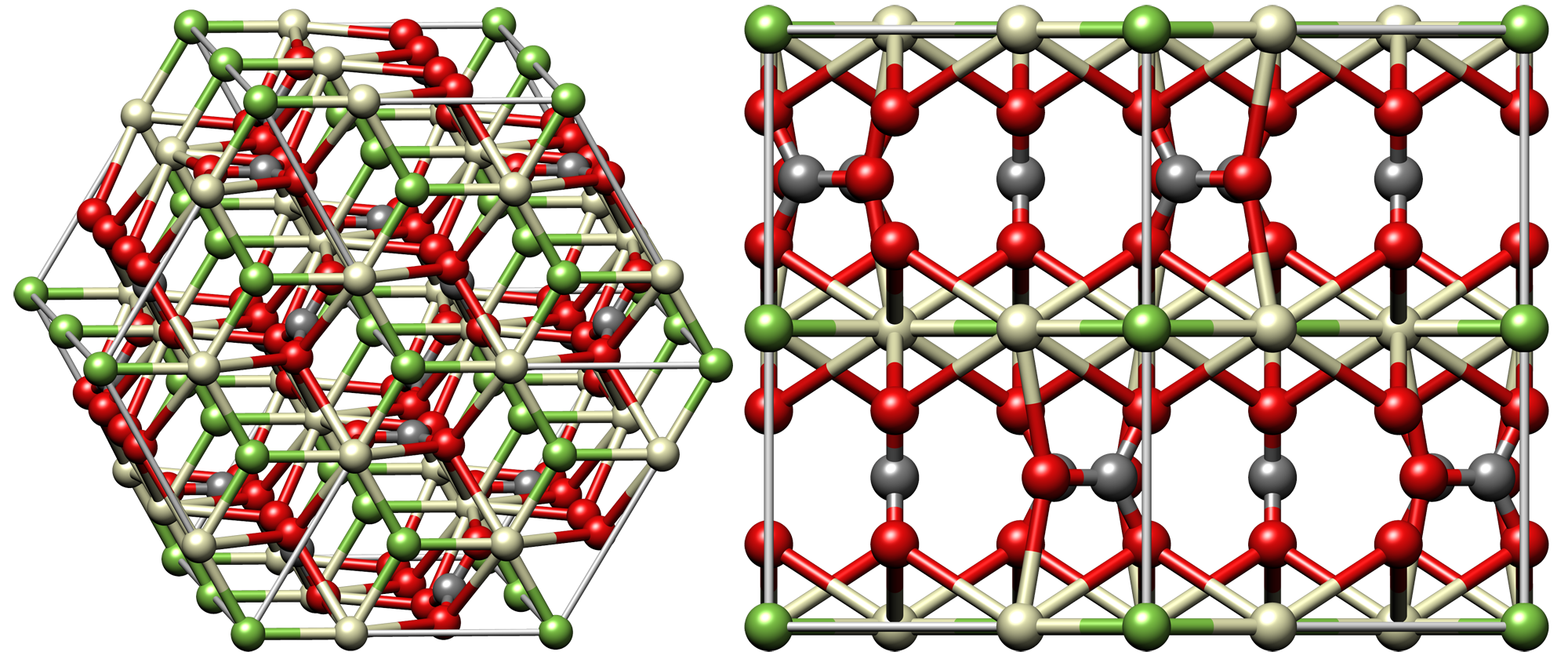
Crystal structure of bastnäsite-(Ce). Color code: carbon, C, blue-gray; fluorine, F, green; cerium, Ce, white; oxygen, O, red.

Bastnäsite is closely related to the mineral series parisite. The two are both rare-earth fluorocarbonates, but parisite's formula of Ca(Ce, La, Nd)_{2}(CO_{3})_{3}F_{2} contains calcium (and a small amount of neodymium) and a different ratio of constituent ions. Parisite could be viewed as a formula unit of calcite (CaCO_{3}) added to two formula units of bastnäsite. In fact, the two have been shown to alter back and forth with the addition or loss of CaCO_{3} in natural environments.

Bastnäsite forms a series with the minerals hydroxylbastnäsite-(Ce) [(Ce,La)CO_{3}(OH,F)] and hydroxylbastnäsite-(Nd). The three are members of a substitution series that involves the possible substitution of fluoride (F^{−}) ions with hydroxyl (OH^{−}) ions.

== Name ==
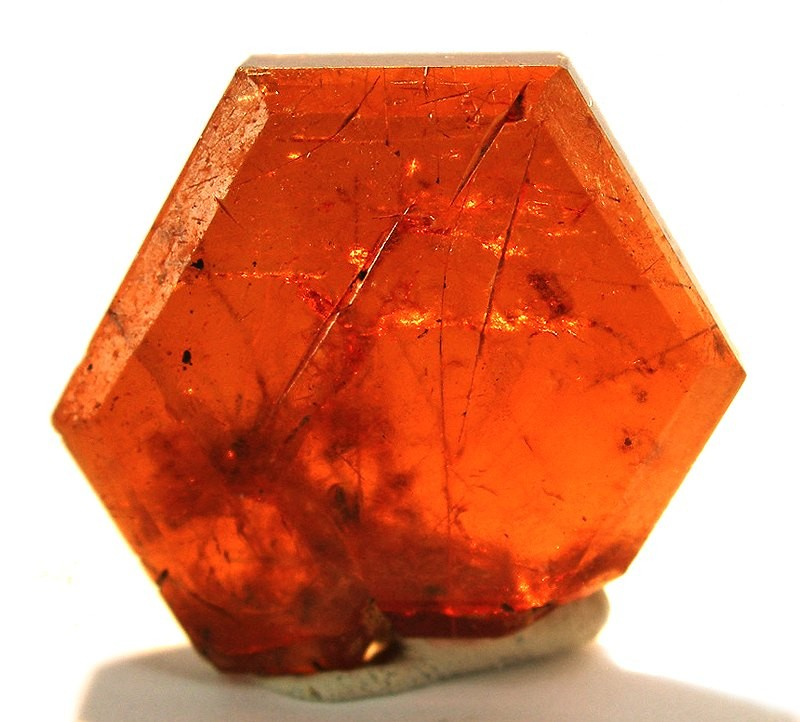
Bastnäsite crystal, Zagi Mountain, Federally Administered Tribal Areas, Pakistan. Size: 1.5×1.5×0.3 cm.

Bastnäsite gets its name from its type locality, the Bastnäs Mine, Riddarhyttan, Västmanland, Sweden. Ore from the Bastnäs Mine led to the discovery of several new minerals and chemical elements by Swedish scientists such as Jöns Jakob Berzelius, Wilhelm Hisinger and Carl Gustav Mosander. Among these are the chemical elements cerium, which was described by Hisinger in 1803, and lanthanum in 1839. Hisinger, who was also the owner of the Bastnäs mine, chose to name one of the new minerals bastnäsit when it was first described by him in 1838.

== Occurrence ==
Although a scarce mineral and never in great concentrations, it is one of the more common rare-earth carbonates. Bastnäsite has been found in karst bauxite deposits in Hungary, Greece and the Balkans region. Also found in carbonatites, a rare carbonate igneous intrusive rock, at the Fen Complex, Norway; Bayan Obo, Inner Mongolia; Kangankunde, Malawi; Kizilcaoren, Turkey and the Mountain Pass rare earth mine in California, US. At Mountain Pass, bastnäsite is the leading ore mineral. Some bastnäsite has been found in the unusual granites of the Langesundsfjord area, Norway; Kola Peninsula, Russia; Mont Saint-Hilaire mines, Quebec, and Thor Lake deposits, Northwest Territories, Canada. Hydrothermal sources have also been reported.

The formation of hydroxylbastnasite (NdCO_{3}OH) can also occur via the crystallization of a rare-earth bearing amorphous precursor. With increasing temperature, the habit of NdCO_{3}OH crystals changes progressively to more complex spherulitic or dendritic morphologies. The development of these crystal morphologies has been suggested to be controlled by the level at which supersaturation is reached in the aqueous solution during the breakdown of the amorphous precursor. At higher temperature (e.g., 220 °C) and after rapid heating (e.g. < 1 h) the amorphous precursor breaks down rapidly and the fast supersaturation promotes spherulitic growth. At a lower temperature (e.g., 165 °C) and slow heating (100 min) the supersaturation levels are approached more slowly than required for spherulitic growth, and thus more regular triangular pyramidal shapes form.

== Mining history ==
In 1949, the huge carbonatite-hosted bastnäsite deposit was discovered at Mountain Pass, San Bernardino County, California, US. This discovery alerted geologists to the existence of a whole new class of rare earth deposit: the rare earth containing carbonatite. Other examples were soon recognized, particularly in Africa and China. The exploitation of this deposit began in the mid-1960s after it had been purchased by Molycorp (Molybdenum Corporation of America). The lanthanide composition of the ore included 0.1% europium oxide, which was needed by the color television industry, to provide the red phosphor, to maximize picture brightness. The composition of the lanthanides was about 49% cerium, 33% lanthanum, 12% neodymium, and 5% praseodymium, with some samarium and gadolinium, or distinctly more lanthanum and less neodymium and heavies as compared to commercial monazite. The europium content was at least double that of a typical monazite.

Mountain Pass bastnäsite was the world's major source of lanthanides from the 1960s to the 1980s. Thereafter, China became an increasingly important rare earth supply. Chinese deposits of bastnäsite include several in Sichuan Province, and the massive deposit at Bayan Obo, Inner Mongolia, which had been discovered early in the 20th century, but not exploited until much later. Bayan Obo is currently (2008) providing the majority of the world's lanthanides. Bayan Obo bastnäsite occurs in association with monazite (plus enough magnetite to sustain one of the largest steel mills in China), and unlike carbonatite bastnäsites, is relatively closer to monazite lanthanide compositions, with the exception of its generous 0.2% content of europium.

== Ore technology ==
At Mountain Pass, bastnäsite ore was finely ground, and subjected to flotation to separate the bulk of the bastnäsite from the accompanying barite, calcite, and dolomite. Marketable products include each of the major intermediates of the ore dressing process: flotation concentrate, acid-washed flotation concentrate, calcined acid washed bastnäsite, and finally a cerium concentrate, which was the insoluble residue left after the calcined bastnäsite had been leached with hydrochloric acid. The lanthanides that dissolved as a result of the acid treatment were subjected to solvent extraction, to capture the europium, and purify the other individual components of the ore. A further product included a lanthanide mix, depleted of much of the cerium, and essentially all of samarium and heavier lanthanides. The calcination of bastnäsite had driven off the carbon dioxide content, leaving an oxide-fluoride, in which the cerium content had become oxidized to the less basic quadrivalent state. However, the high temperature of the calcination gave less-reactive oxide, and the use of hydrochloric acid, which can cause reduction of quadrivalent cerium, led to an incomplete separation of cerium and the trivalent lanthanides. By contrast, in China, processing of bastnäsite, after concentration, starts with heating with sulfuric acid.

=== Extraction of rare-earth metals ===
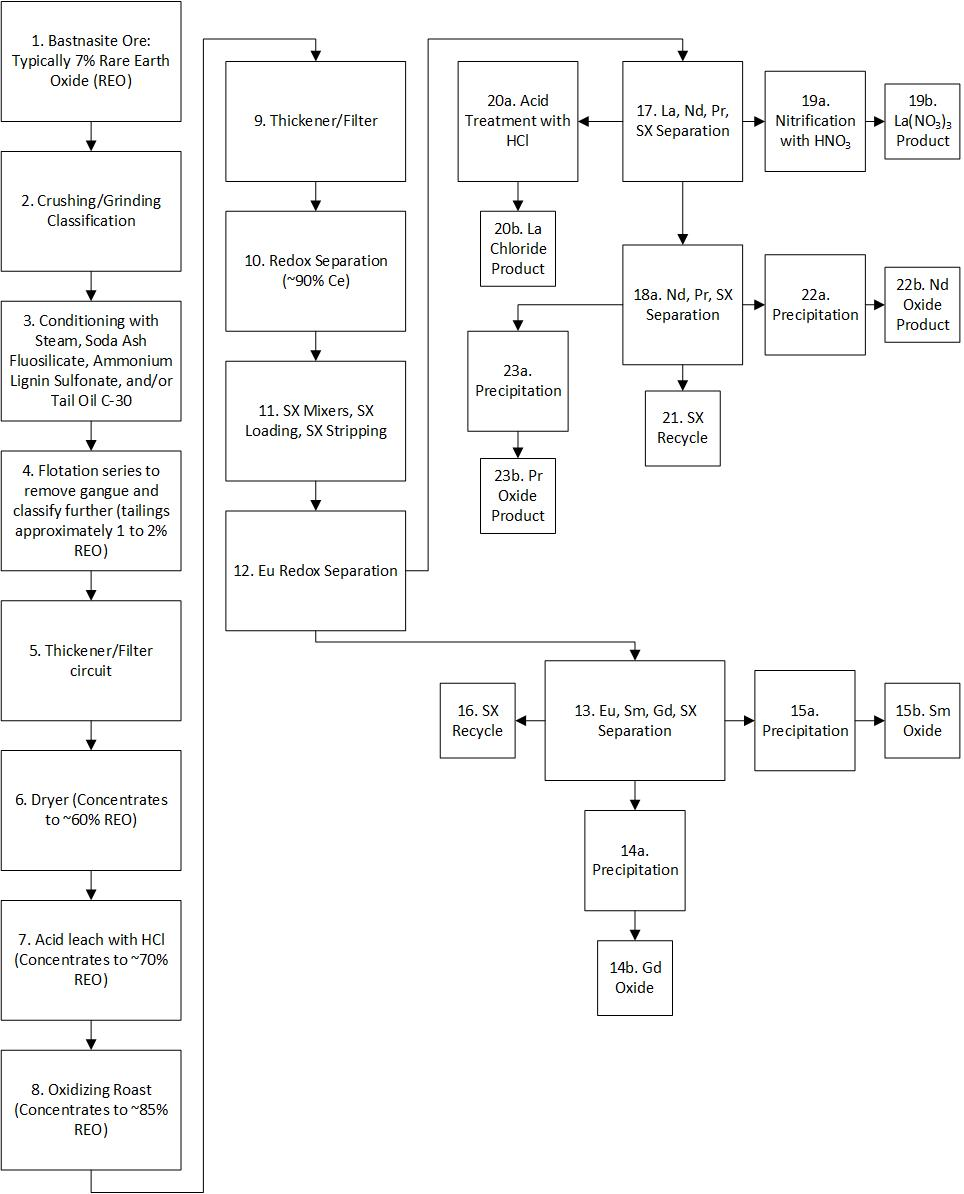
Process flow diagram for pyrometallurgy extraction of rare-earth metals from bastnasite ore

Bastnäsite ore is typically used to produce rare-earth metals. The following steps and process flow diagram detail the rare-earth-metal extraction process from the ore.

1. After extraction, bastnasite ore is typically used in this process, with an average of 7% REO (rare-earth oxides).
2. The ore goes through comminution using rod mills, ball mills, or autogenous mills.
3. Steam is consistently used to condition the ground ore, along with soda ash fluosilicate, and usually Tail Oil C-30. This is done to coat the various types of rare earth metals with either flocculent, collectors, or modifiers for easier separation in the next step.
4. Flotation using the previous chemicals to separate the gangue from the rare-earth metals.
5. Concentrate the rare-earth metals and filter out large particles.
6. Remove excess water by heating to ~100 °C.
7. Add HCl to solution to reduce pH to < 5. This enables certain REM (rare-earth metals) to become soluble (Ce is an example).
8. Oxidizing roast further concentrates the solution to approximately 85% REO. This is done at ~100 °C and higher if necessary.
9. Enables solution to concentrate further and filters out large particles again.
10. Reduction agents (based on area) are used to remove Ce as Ce carbonate or CeO_{2}, typically.
11. Solvents are added (solvent type and concentration based on area, availability, and cost) to help separate Eu, Sm, and Gd from La, Nd, and Pr.
12. Reduction agents (based on area) are used to oxidize Eu, Sm, and Gd.
13. Eu is precipitated and calcified.
14. Gd is precipitated as an oxide.
15. Sm is precipitated as an oxide.
16. Solvent is recycled into step 11. Additional solvent is added based on concentration and purity.
17. La separated from Nd, Pr, and SX.
18. Nd and Pr separated. SX goes on for recovery and recycle.
19. One way to collect La is adding HNO_{3}, creating La(NO_{3})_{3}. HNO_{3} typically added at a very high molarity (1–5 M), depending on La concentration and amount.
20. Another method is to add HCl to La, creating LaCl_{3}. HCl is added at 1 M to 5 M depending on La concentration.
21. Solvent from La, Nd, and Pr separation is recycled to step 11.
22. Nd is precipitated as an oxide product.
23. Pr is precipitated as an oxide product.

== Bibliography ==
- Palache, P.; Berman H.; Frondel, C. (1960). "Dana's System of Mineralogy, Volume II: Halides, Nitrates, Borates, Carbonates, Sulfates, Phosphates, Arsenates, Tungstates, Molybdates, Etc. (Seventh Edition)" John Wiley and Sons, Inc., New York, pp. 289–291.
