= Synchysite-(Ce) =

Carbonate mineral

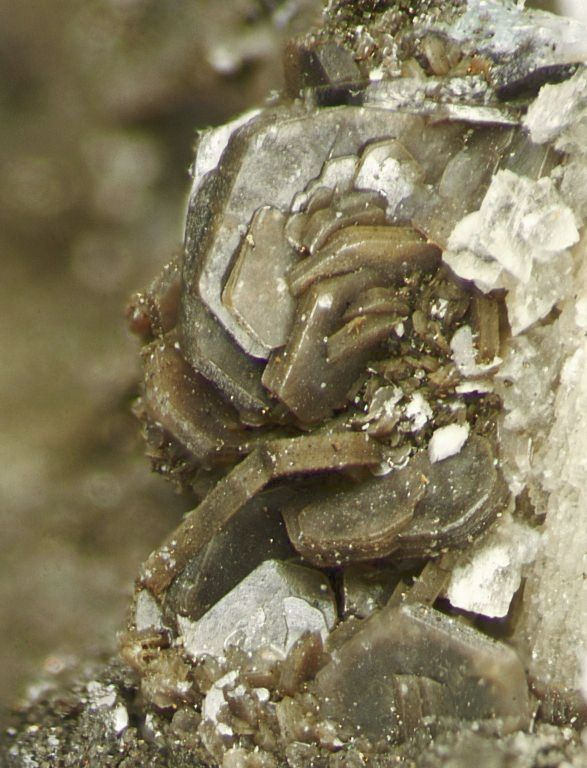
- Synchysite-(Ce) from Poudrette quarry, Mont Saint-Hilaire

General
- Category: Minerals
- Formula: Ca(Ce,La)(CO_{3})_{2}F
- IMA symbol: Syn-Ce
- Strunz classification: 5.BD.20c
- Dana classification: 16a.1.3.1
- Crystal system: Monoclinic
- Crystal class: Prismatic (2/m) (same H-M symbol)
- Space group: C2/c

Identification
- Tenacity: Brittle
- Mohs scale hardness: 4.5
- Luster: Vitreous
- Diaphaneity: Translucent
- Pleochroism: Weak

Synchysite-(Ce) is a carbonate mineral and an end member of the synchysite group. The general chemical formula is Ca(Ce,La)(CO_{3})_{2}F.

== Discovery and naming ==
Synchysite-(Ce) was discovered in 1900 by Gustaf Flink. The name is derived from the Greek "σύγχΰσις", meaning "confounding", a reference to the possibility to confuse the mineral with Parisite-(Ce).

== Occurrences ==
Synchysite-(Ce) is found in rare-earth element bearing pegmatites. It can also occur as a hydrothermal mineral in granite, alkalic syenite and carbonatite.
