= Hisingerite =

Phyllosilicate mineral

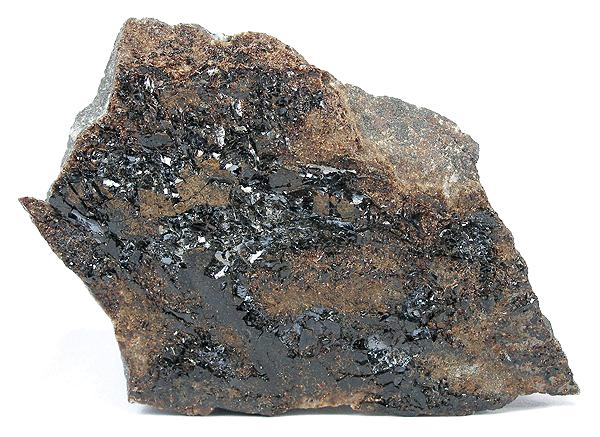
- Crystallized plates of reddish-brown, silver metallic-lustre hisingerite crystals

General
- Category: Phyllosilicate minerals
- Formula: Fe^{III}_{2}Si_{2}O_{5}(OH)_{4} · 2 H_{2}O
- IMA symbol: Hsg
- Strunz classification: 9.ED.10
- Crystal system: Monoclinic; Unknown space group
- Unit cell: a = 5.4, b = 9.03 c = 14.99 [Å]; β = 98.32°; Z = 4

Identification
- Color: Black, brownish-black
- Crystal habit: Massive, compact; acicular, may be minutely spherical.
- Cleavage: None
- Fracture: Conchoidal
- Tenacity: Brittle
- Mohs scale hardness: 2.5 - 3.0
- Luster: Vitreous, resinous, greasy
- Streak: Yellowish brown, green
- Diaphaneity: Transparent to translucent
- Specific gravity: 2.43 - 2.67
- Optical properties: Biaxial (-)
- Refractive index: n_{α} = 1.715 n_{γ} = 1.730
- Birefringence: δ = 0.015

Hisingerite is an iron(III) phyllosilicate mineral with formula Fe^{III}_{2}Si_{2}O_{5}(OH)_{4} · 2 H_{2}O. A black or dark brown, lustrous secondary mineral, it is formed by the weathering or hydrothermal alteration of other iron silicate and sulfide minerals.

It was first described in 1751 by A.F. Cronstedt from Väster Silvberg, Dalarna, Sweden (under the name “kolspeglande järnmalm”), and in 1810 by W. Hisinger from the Gillinge iron mine, Södermanland, Sweden (“svart stenart”, later “gillingit”). In 1828 it was found at an occurrence in Riddarhyttan, Vastmanland, Sweden. It was named after Wilhelm Hisinger (1766–1852), a Swedish chemist.

There are also aluminian hisingerite variety in which one of the iron atoms is replaced by aluminium and chrome-alumina-hisingerite variety in which chromium substitutes for iron.
