= Thor Lake =

Mine in Northwest Territories, Canada

- Location in Canada
- Location: Northwest Territories, Canada; 62°05′55″N 112°34′34″W
- Products: Rare-earth elements

Thor Lake is a deposit of rare metals located in the Blachford Lake intrusive complex. It is situated 5 km (3.1 mi) north of the Hearne Channel of Great Slave Lake, Northwest Territories, Canada, approximately 100 km (62 mi) east-southeast of the capital city of Yellowknife. Geologically located on the Canadian Shield it is mostly composed of peralkaline syenite (granitic rock with low quartz content). The Blatchford Lake complex was created in the early Proterozoic, 2.14 Ga ago. The deposit is divided in several sub-structures. In a small zone at the northern edge of the syenite, the T-Zone, minerals like bastnäsite, phenakite and xenotime can be found.

Within the Mackenzie mining district, Thor Lake may contain some of the largest deposits of light and heavy rare-earth element (REE) ores. The major elements of these ores are europium, terbium, dysprosium, neodymium, gallium, niobium, thorium, zirconium and beryllium. Thor Lake represents one of the largest tantalum reserves in Canada having estimated reserves of 70 million tonnes (69 million long tons; 77 million short tons) of ore grading 0.03% tantalum and 0.04% niobium. A significant proportion of the REE deposits lie within the boundaries of the Nechalacho Rare Earth Element Project, funded by Avalon Advanced Materials. The extraction of these resources could be important for the global REE production, which almost exclusively occurs in China, especially around the Inner Mongolia Autonomous Region in Bayan Obo Mining District.
