= Baiyun railway station =

Baiyun railway station may refer to:

- Baiyun railway station (Inner Mongolia), a railway station in Holingol, Tongliao, Inner Mongolia, China
- Guangzhou Baiyun railway station, also known as Tangxi railway station, a railway station in Baiyun District, Guangzhou, Guangdong Province, China

== See also ==
- Baiyun'ebo railway station, or Bayan'obo railway station, in Bayan Obo Mining District, Baotou City, Inner Mongolia, China
