= Britholite-(Ce) =

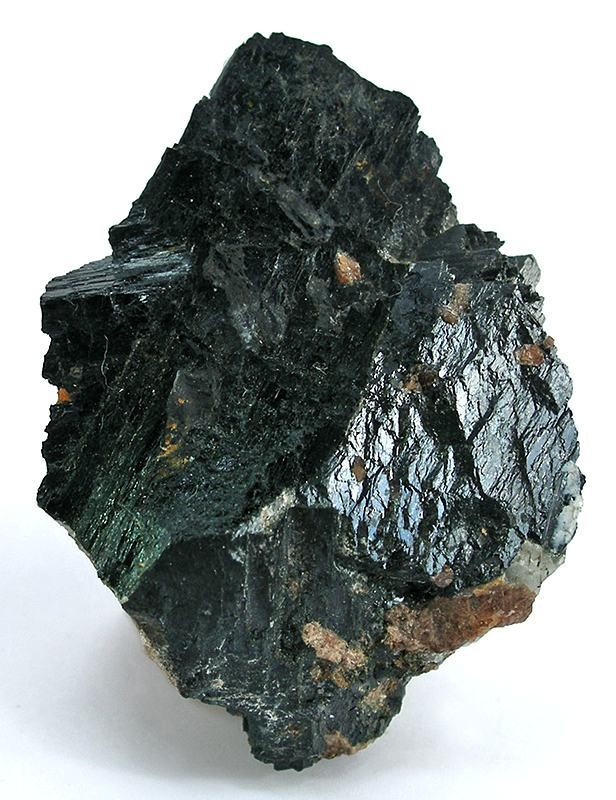
- A photo of the mineral

General
- Category: Minerals
- Formula: (Ce,Ca)_{5}(SiO_{4})_{3}OH
- IMA symbol: Bri-Ce
- Crystal system: Hexagonal - Dipyramidal
- Space group: P6_{3}/m

Identification
- Colour: Brown, greenish brown, yellow, resin brown, black
- Mohs scale hardness: 5.5
- Luster: Adamantine - Resinous
- Specific gravity: 4.45
- Density: 4.45

Major varieties
- hardness: 5.5 on the Mohs scale
- type locality: Naujakasik(Naajakasik), Tunulliarfik Fjord, Ilímaussaq complex, Narsaq, Kujalleq, Greenland

Britholite-(Ce) is a rare radioactive mineral with the chemical formula (Ce,Ca)_{5}(SiO_{4})_{3}OH. It comes in a variety of different colors. Its type locality is Naujakasik (Naajakasik), Tunulliarfik Fjord, Ilímaussaq complex, Narsaq, Kujalleq, Greenland.

== Discovery ==
The mineral was first discovered by Gustaf Flink in 1897 inside a nepheline-syenite at Naujakasik, Ilímaussaq complex, Greenland. It was named after the Greek word βρῖθος (brithos) which means "weight" referring to its high specific gravity, it was later named britholite-(Ce) due to the high amounts of cerium in its composition.
