= Georg Brandt =

Swedish scientist (1694–1768)

- Born: 26 June 1694; Riddarhyttan, Sweden
- Died: 29 April 1768 (aged 73); Stockholm, Sweden
- Known for: Discovery of cobalt
- Scientific career
- Fields: Chemistry, mineralogy
- Institutions: Uppsala University

Georg Brandt (26 June 1694 – 29 April 1768) was a Swedish chemist and mineralogist who discovered cobalt c. 1735. He was the first person to discover a metal unknown in ancient times. He is also known for exposing fraudulent alchemists operating during his lifetime.

== Biography ==
Brandt was born on 26 June 1694, in Riddarhyttan, to Jurgen Brandt, a mineowner and pharmacist, and Katarina Ysing. He was professor of chemistry at Uppsala University, and died in Stockholm. He was able to show that cobalt was the source of the blue color in glass, which previously had been attributed to the bismuth found with cobalt. He died on 29 April 1768, aged 73.

In about 1741, he wrote: "As there are six kinds of metals, so I have also shown with reliable experiments... that there are also six kinds of half-metals: a new half-metal, namely Cobalt regulus in addition to Mercury, Bismuth, Zinc, and the reguluses of Antimony and Arsenic". He gave six ways to distinguish bismuth and cobalt which were typically found in the same ores:

1. Bismuth fractures while Cobalt is more like a true metal.
2. The regulus of Shetz fuses with flint and fixed alkali giving a blue glass known as zaffera, sasre, or smalt. Bismuth does not.
3. Bismuth melts easily and if kept melted, calcinates forming a yellow powder.
4. Bismuth amalgamates with Mercury; the regulus of Cobalt does not at all.
5. Bismuth dissolved in nitric acid and with aqua regia gives a white precipitate when put in pure water. The regulus of Cobalt needs alkalies to precipitate, and then forms dark or black precipitates.
