= Bastnäs =

Coordinates: 59°50′48″N 15°35′20″E

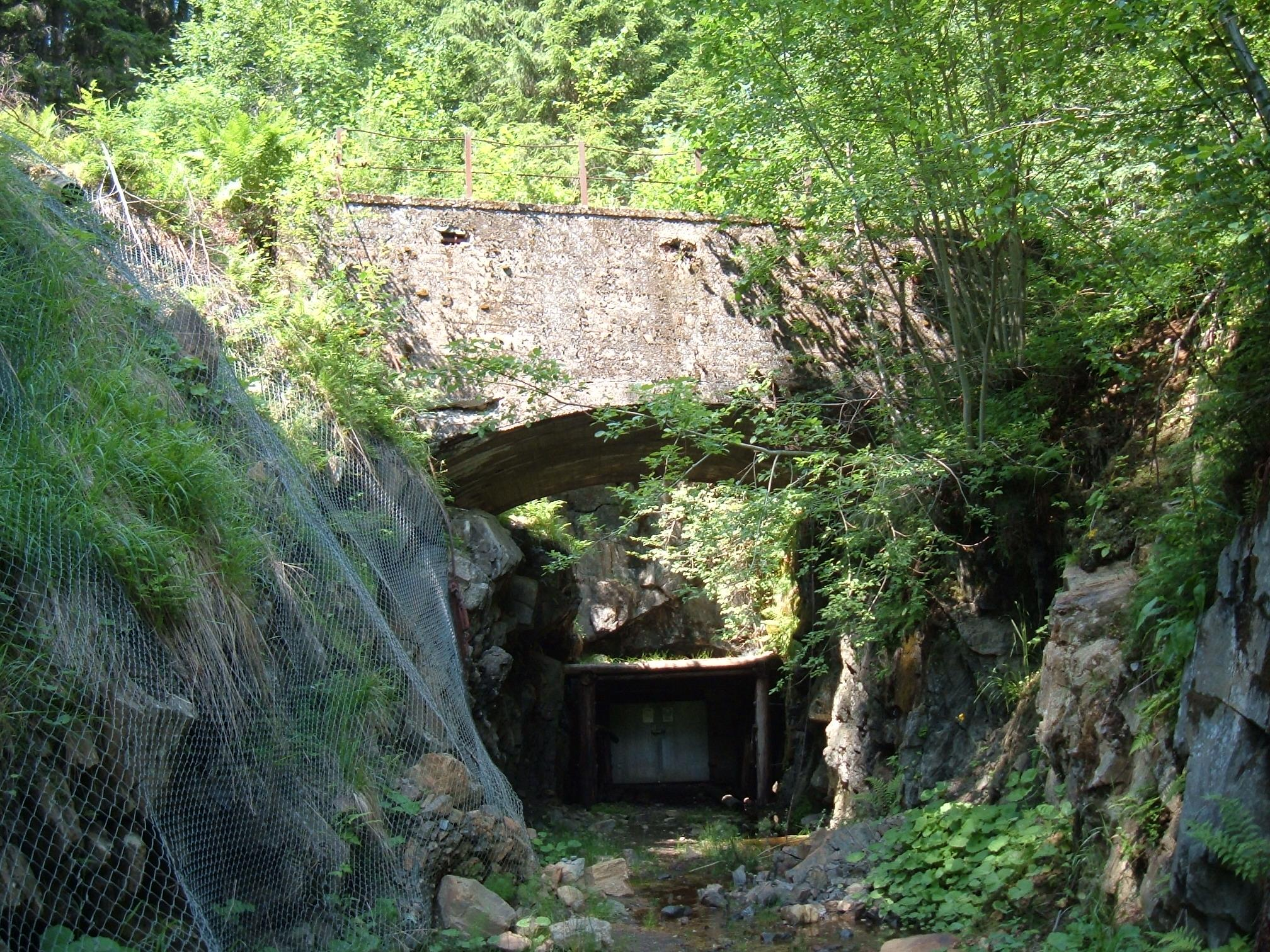
The New mine of Bastnäs Swedish: Nya Bastnässtollen

Bastnäs (Swedish: Bastnäs or Bastnäsfältet) is an ore field near Riddarhyttan, Västmanland, Sweden. The mines in Bastnäs were earliest mentioned in 1692. Iron, copper and rare-earth elements were extracted from the mines and 4,500 tons of cerium was produced between 1875 and 1888.

The chemical element cerium was first discovered in Bastnäs in 1803 by Jöns Jakob Berzelius and Wilhelm Hisinger in the form of its oxide, ceria, and independently in Germany by Martin Heinrich Klaproth. Lanthanum was also first discovered in minerals from Bastnäs in 1839 by Carl Gustav Mosander. The mineral bastnäsite is named after Bastnäs.

== Gallery ==
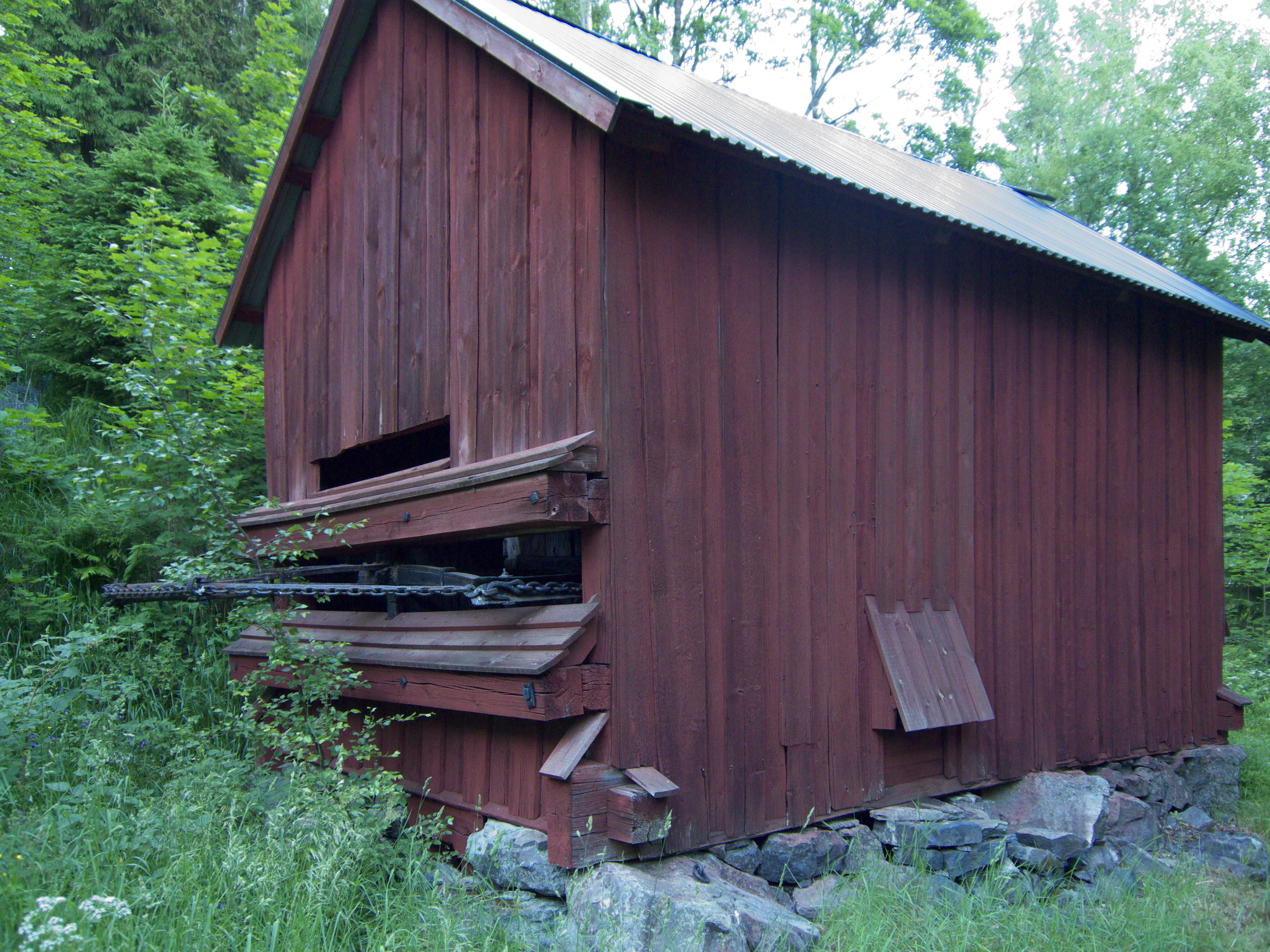
Transmission house at Bastnäs mines

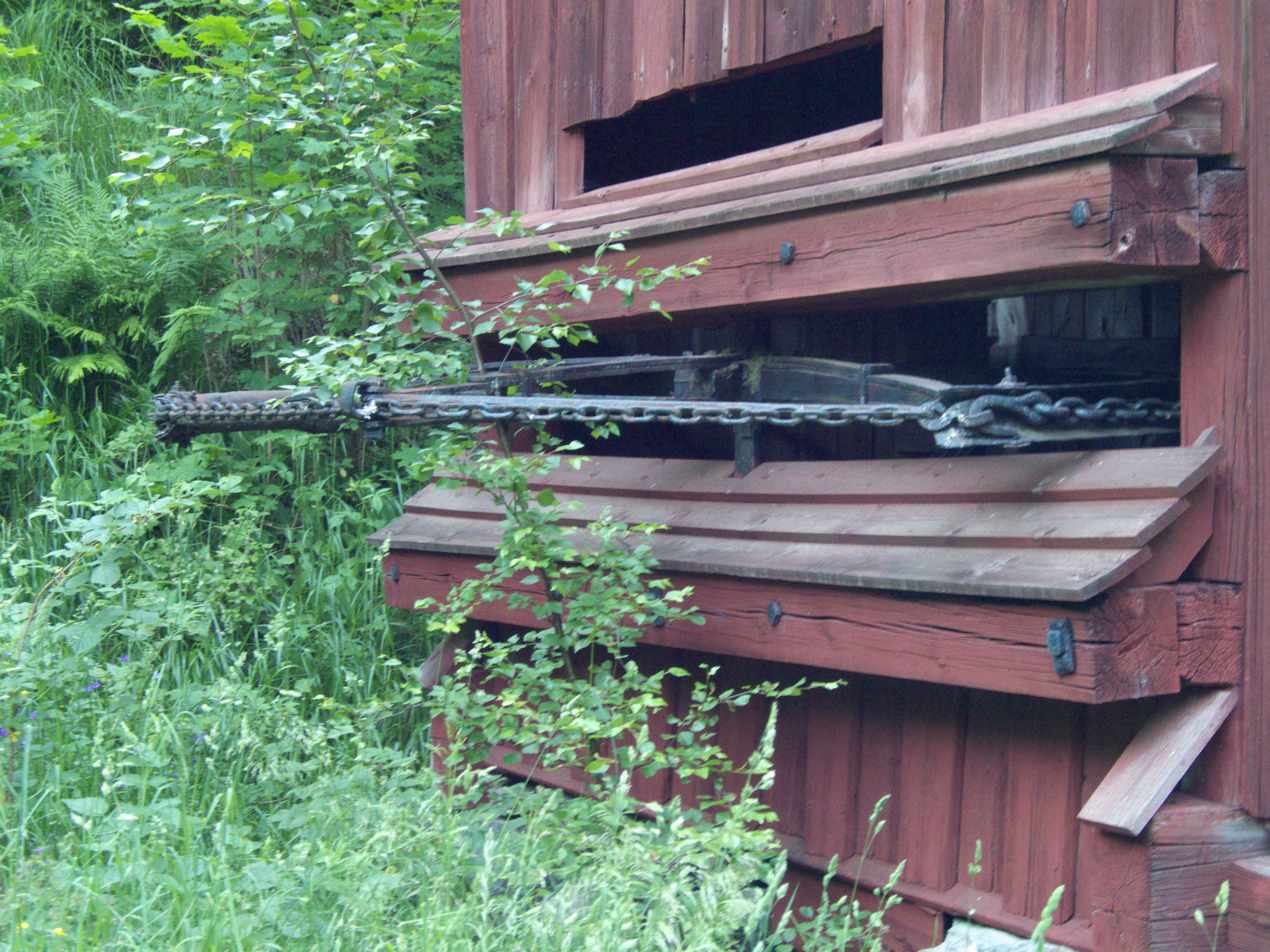
Mechanism for hauling ore at Bastnäs mines
