= Fluoroformic acid =

Names
- IUPAC name Fluoroformic acid
- Other names Carbonofluoridic acid

Identifiers
CAS Number	35576-88-6
3D model (JSmol)	Interactive image
ChemSpider	10662175
PubChem CID	17936736
CompTox Dashboard (EPA)	DTXSID00591660
- InChI: InChI=1S/CHFO2/c2-1(3)4/h(H,3,4) Key: ABDBNWQRPYOPDF-UHFFFAOYSA-N
- SMILES: C(=O)(O)F

Properties
Chemical formula	CHFO_{2}
Molar mass	64.015 g·mol^{−1}
- Except where otherwise noted, data are given for materials in their standard state (at 25 °C [77 °F], 100 kPa). Infobox references

Fluoroformic acid is a fluoride derivative of formic acid that has been the subject of a number of theoretical studies in chemistry. As of 1985, elementary textbooks generally state that it does not exist due to its rapid decomposition into carbon dioxide and hydrofluoric acid, although some experiments have attempted to isolate it.

The anion, fluoroformate, has been confirmed to exist and be stable. Its structure has been characterized.

== See also ==
- Formyl fluoride
