= Parisite-(Ce) =

Parisite
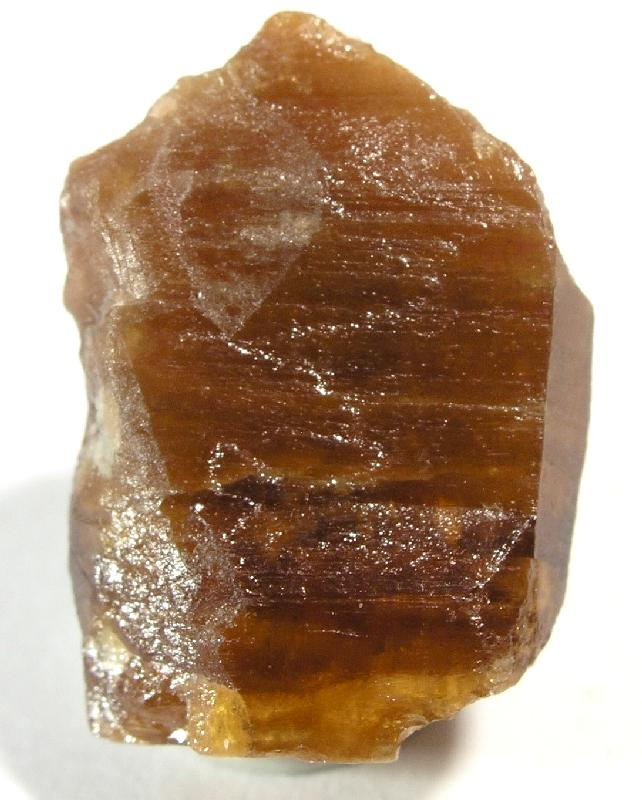
- Parisite from Muzo, Vasquez-Yacopí Mining District, Boyacá Department, Colombia, size: 1.3 x 1 x .7 cm

General
- Category: Carbonate
- Formula: Ca(Ce,La)_{2}(CO_{3})_{3}F_{2}
- IMA symbol: Pst
- Strunz classification: 5.BD.20b
- Dana classification: 16a.01.05.01
- Crystal system: Monoclinic
- Crystal class: Domatic (m) (same H-M symbol)
- Space group: Cc
- Unit cell: a = 12.305 Å, b = 7.1056 Å, c = 28.2478 Å; β = 98.246°; Z = 12

Identification
- Formula mass: 537.24 g/mol
- Color: Brown, brownish yellow, gray-yellow, grayish yellow, yellow, waxy yellow, colourless to yellow in transmitted light
- Crystal habit: Acicular
- Mohs scale hardness: 4 1/2
- Luster: Vitreous - greasy
- Streak: White
- Diaphaneity: Transparent to translucent
- Specific gravity: 4.34
- Density: 4.38

Parisite is a rare mineral consisting of cerium, lanthanum and calcium fluoro-carbonate, Ca(Ce,La)_{2}(CO_{3})_{3}F_{2}. Parisite is mostly parisite-(Ce), but when neodymium is present in the structure the mineral becomes parisite-(Nd).

It is found only as crystals, which belong to the trigonal or monoclinic pseudo-hexagonal system and usually have the form of acute double pyramids terminated by the basal planes; the faces of the hexagonal pyramids are striated horizontally, and parallel to the basal plane there is a perfect cleavage. The crystals are hair-brown in color and are translucent. The hardness is 4.5 and the specific gravity is 4.36. Light which has traversed a crystal of parisite exhibits a characteristic absorption spectrum.

At first, the only known occurrence of this mineral was in the famous emerald mine at Muzo in Colombia, South America, where it was found by J.J. Paris, who rediscovered and worked the mine in the early part of the 19th century; here it is associated with emerald in a bituminous limestone of Cretaceous age.

Closely allied to parisite, and indeed first described as such, is a mineral from the nepheline-syenite district of Julianehaab in south Greenland. To this the name synchysite has been given. The crystals are rhombohedral (as distinct from hexagonal; they have the composition CeFCa(CO_{3})_{2}, and specific gravity of 2.90. At the same locality there is also found a barium-parisite, which differs from the Colombian parisite in containing barium in place of calcium, the formula being (CeF)_{2}Ba(CO_{3})_{3}: this is named cordylite on account of the club-shaped form of its hexagonal crystals. Bastnasite is a cerium lanthanum and neodymium fluoro-carbonate (CeF)CO_{3}, from Bastnas, near Riddarhyttan, in Vestmanland, Sweden, and the Pikes Peak region in Colorado, United States.
