= Bayan Obo Mining District =

Bayan'obo 白云鄂博矿区 • ᠪᠠᠶᠠᠨ ᠣᠪᠣᠭ᠋᠎ᠠ ᠠᠭᠤᠷᠬᠠᠢ ᠶᠢᠨ ᠲᠣᠭᠣᠷᠢᠭ
- District
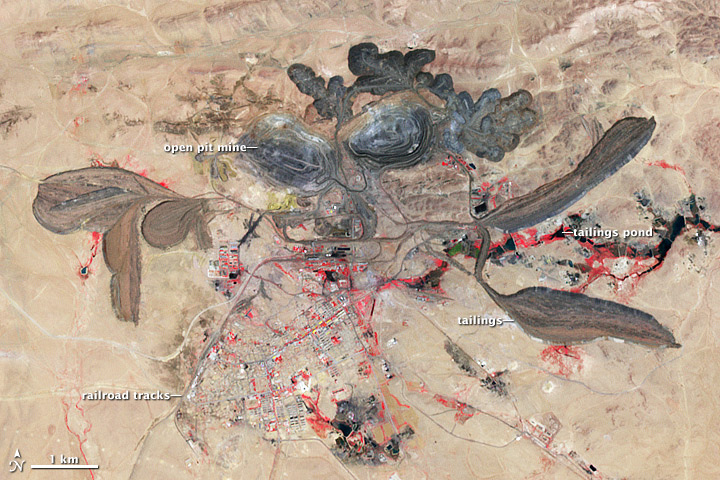
- Bayan Obo, 2006 false color ASTER image by NASA

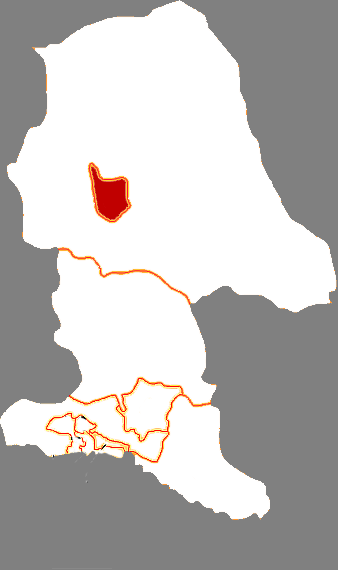
- Location in Baotou

- Location within Inner Mongolia Location within China
- Coordinates: 41°46′58″N 109°58′25″E
- Country: China
- Autonomous region: Inner Mongolia
- Prefecture-level city: Baotou
- District seat: Tongyang Road Subdistrict

Area
  - Total: 247.89 km^{2} (95.71 sq mi)

Population (2020)
  - Total: 22,681
  - Density: 91.496/km^{2} (236.97/sq mi)
- Time zone: UTC+8 (China Standard)
- Website: www.byeb.gov.cn

Bayan Obo Mining District

Chinese name
- Simplified Chinese: 白云鄂博矿区
- Traditional Chinese: 白雲鄂博礦區
- Literal meaning: rich ovoo mining district
Transcriptions
Standard Mandarin
- Hanyu Pinyin: Báiyún'èbó Kuàng Qū

Mongolian name
- Mongolian Cyrillic: Баян-Овоо Уурхайн дүүрэг
- Mongolian script: ᠪᠠᠶᠠᠨ ᠣᠪᠣᠭ᠋᠎ᠠ ᠠᠭᠤᠷᠬᠠᠢ ᠶᠢᠨ ᠲᠣᠭᠣᠷᠢᠭ
Transcriptions
- SASM/GNC: Bayan Oboɣ-a Aɣurqai-yin toɣoriɣ

Bayan'obo Mining District (Mongolian: ᠪᠠᠶᠠᠨ ᠣᠪᠣᠭ᠋᠎ᠠ ᠠᠭᠤᠷᠬᠠᠢ ᠶᠢᠨ ᠲᠣᠭᠣᠷᠢᠭ, Chinese: 白云鄂博矿区), or Baiyun-Obo or Baiyun'ebo, is a mining district in the west of Inner Mongolia, China. It is under the administration of Baotou City, the downtown of which is more than 120 kilometres (75 mi) to the south.

The mines north of the town are the largest deposits of rare-earth elements yet found and, as of 2005, responsible for 45% of global rare-earth element production.

As of 2006, two circular open-pit mines are visible, as well as a number of tailings ponds and tailings piles. The mining site has doubled in size over 25 years, and new open-pit mines were opened to the west of the site as of 2013.

== Administrative divisions ==
Bayan Obo Mining District is made up of 2 subdistricts.

Name	Simplified Chinese	Hanyu Pinyin	Mongolian (Hudum Script)	Mongolian (Cyrillic)	Administrative division code
Subdistricts
Mining Road Subdistrict	矿山路街道	Kuàngshānlù Jiēdào	ᠠᠭᠤᠷᠬᠠᠢ ᠵᠠᠮ ᠤᠨ ᠵᠡᠭᠡᠯᠢ ᠭᠤᠳᠤᠮᠵᠢ	Уурхай замын зээл гудамж	150206001
Tongyang Road Subdistrict	通阳道街道	Tōngyángdào Jiēdào	ᠲᠦᠩ ᠶᠠᠩ ᠵᠠᠮ ᠤᠨ ᠵᠡᠭᠡᠯᠢ ᠭᠤᠳᠤᠮᠵᠢ	Дүн ян замын зээл гудамж	150206002

== Climate ==
Climate data for Bayan Obo, elevation 1,612 m (5,289 ft), (1991–2020 normals, extremes 1991–present)
Month	Jan	Feb	Mar	Apr	May	Jun	Jul	Aug	Sep	Oct	Nov	Dec	Year
Record high °C (°F)	8.9 (48.0)	12.8 (55.0)	20.3 (68.5)	27.5 (81.5)	31.5 (88.7)	35.1 (95.2)	36.2 (97.2)	32.7 (90.9)	32.1 (89.8)	23.8 (74.8)	14.5 (58.1)	9.1 (48.4)	36.2 (97.2)
Mean daily maximum °C (°F)	−8.2 (17.2)	−3.6 (25.5)	3.8 (38.8)	12.4 (54.3)	19.1 (66.4)	24.2 (75.6)	26.5 (79.7)	24.3 (75.7)	18.7 (65.7)	10.7 (51.3)	0.9 (33.6)	−6.8 (19.8)	10.2 (50.3)
Daily mean °C (°F)	−14.3 (6.3)	−10.2 (13.6)	−2.9 (26.8)	5.7 (42.3)	12.7 (54.9)	18.1 (64.6)	20.6 (69.1)	18.5 (65.3)	12.4 (54.3)	4.1 (39.4)	−5.3 (22.5)	−12.6 (9.3)	3.9 (39.0)
Mean daily minimum °C (°F)	−19.0 (−2.2)	−15.2 (4.6)	−8.4 (16.9)	−0.5 (31.1)	6.1 (43.0)	12.0 (53.6)	15.0 (59.0)	13.2 (55.8)	7.1 (44.8)	−0.9 (30.4)	−9.9 (14.2)	−17.0 (1.4)	−1.5 (29.4)
Record low °C (°F)	−32.0 (−25.6)	−29.6 (−21.3)	−23.3 (−9.9)	−15.2 (4.6)	−8.9 (16.0)	2.9 (37.2)	5.4 (41.7)	2.6 (36.7)	−6.4 (20.5)	−15.8 (3.6)	−25.8 (−14.4)	−31.6 (−24.9)	−32.0 (−25.6)
Average precipitation mm (inches)	2.0 (0.08)	2.6 (0.10)	5.5 (0.22)	6.5 (0.26)	20.3 (0.80)	34.6 (1.36)	66.0 (2.60)	58.0 (2.28)	35.0 (1.38)	10.3 (0.41)	4.4 (0.17)	2.0 (0.08)	247.2 (9.74)
Average precipitation days (≥ 0.1 mm)	3.6	3.3	4.4	3.1	5.6	9.3	11.6	9.6	6.9	3.5	3.9	3.4	68.2
Average snowy days	5.8	5.5	5.8	3.1	1.1	0	0	0	0.3	2.9	5.7	6.7	36.9
Average relative humidity (%)	63	54	42	34	37	45	53	56	54	50	58	63	51
Mean monthly sunshine hours	235.4	234.2	281.0	298.5	323.0	305.4	303.5	298.0	272.6	267.7	227.0	220.1	3,266.4
Percentage possible sunshine	79	78	75	74	72	67	67	71	74	79	78	78	74
Source: China Meteorological Administration

== Economic geology ==
China produced about 81,000 tons of rare-earth metals in 2001; the number jumped to about 120,000 by 2006. According to the Chinese Society of Rare Earths, 9,600 to 12,000 cubic metres (340,000 to 420,000 cubic feet) of waste gas—containing dust concentrate, hydrofluoric acid, sulfur dioxide, and sulfuric acid—are released with every ton of rare metals that are mined. Approximately 75 m^{3} (2,600 cu ft) of acidic wastewater, plus about a ton of radioactive waste residue are also produced.

== Mine deposit ==
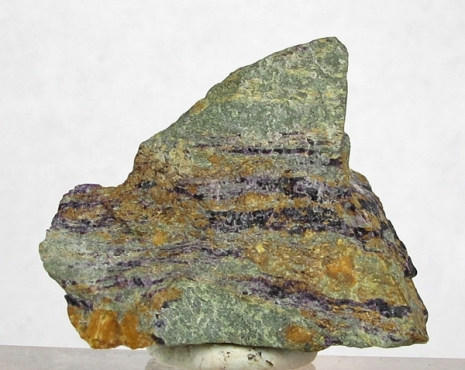
Zhonghuacerite-(Ce) specimen from Bayan Obo. This unique barium-cerium-carbonate-halide is a member of the bastnasite group.

Very large rare-earth elements (REE) Fe-Nb deposit (Bayan-Obo type), discovered as an iron deposit in 1927. REE minerals were discovered in 1936, and niobium-bearing ores in the late 1950s. Reserves are estimated at more than 40 million tons of REE minerals grading at 3–5.4% REE (70% of world's known REE reserves), 1 million tons of Nb_{2}O_{5} and 470 million tons of iron. The deposit also contains an estimated 130 million tons of fluorite.

Bayan'obo is the world's largest known REE deposit. The fluorite content of the ores also makes it the world's largest fluorite deposit. According to the BBC, for every one ton of rare-earth minerals processed at Bayan Obo, 2000 tons of toxic waste are produced.

The deposit occurs in an east–west trending Mesoproterozoic rift zone along the northern margin of the Sino-Korean Craton. Host strata are quartzite, slate, limestone, and dolomite. Dolomite is the main host rock. The orebodies are stratiform and lenticular, with masses, bands, layers, veins, and disseminations. Besides clear features of hydrothermal mineralization, the deposit also exhibits Mg, Fe, Na and F metasomatism. Sm-Nd monazite isochron age for bastnaesite and riebeckite is 1200 to 1300 Ma, whereas Th-Pb and Sm-Nd age of Ba-REE-F carbonates and aeschynite is 474 to 402 Ma.

== See also ==
- Nanling Mountains
- Mountain Pass Mine
- Mount Weld mine
