= Gustaf Flink =

Swedish mineralogist

Gustaf Flink, born 18 January 1848 in Ås Parish, Skaraborg County, died 11 January 1931, was a Swedish mineralogist.

Flink received training as a primary school teacher and graduated in Gothenburg in 1869. In 1871 he received a teaching position in Stockholm. He accompanied Adolf Erik Nordenskiöld on his expedition to Greenland, during which he collected minerals and petrified plants on Iceland in 1883. He returned to Iceland in 1893. On behalf of a Royal Danish geological and geographical commission he made mineralogical investigations in southern Greenland in 1897.

He was assistant at the mineralogical department of the Swedish Museum of Natural History from 1905 to 1916. In the 1910s and 1920s he primarily studied the rich and varied mineral deposits in the Långban area, and described many previously unknown minerals, for example Synchysite-(Ce) and Cordylite.

Flink was awarded an honorary doctorate by Uppsala University in 1900. The mineral flinkite was named in his honor.
