= Wilhelm Hisinger =

Swedish physicist and chemist

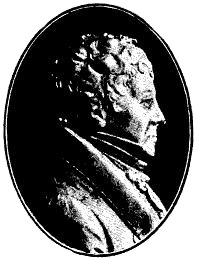
- Wilhelm Hisinger in Nordisk familjebok
- Born: 23 December 1766; Västmanland, Sweden
- Died: 28 June 1852 (aged 85); Skinnskatteberg, Västmanland, Sweden
- Known for: Discovery of cerium
- Scientific career
- Fields: chemistry, physics, geology, mineralogy
- Author abbrev. (botany): Hising.

Wilhelm Hisinger (23 December 1766 – 28 June 1852) was a Swedish physicist and chemist who in 1807, working in coordination with Jöns Jakob Berzelius, noted that in electrolysis any given substance always went to the same pole, and that substances attracted to the same pole had other properties in common. This showed that there was at least a qualitative correlation between the chemical and electrical natures of bodies.

== Career ==
In 1803, in separate laboratories, Martin Heinrich Klaproth in one, and Berzelius and Hisinger in another, the element Cerium was discovered, which was named after the newly discovered asteroid, Ceres. It was discovered nearly simultaneously by both laboratories, though it was later shown that Berzelius and Hisinger's cerium was actually a mixture of cerium, lanthanum and so-called didymium. The element was first isolated by Carl Gustaf Mosander in 1838.

Hisinger was elected a member of the Royal Swedish Academy of Sciences in 1804.

== Death and legacy ==
Hisinger died in 1852, aged 85.

The mineral hisingerite, an iron silicate, with the formula Fe_{2}Si_{2}O_{5}(OH)_{4}·2H_{2}O, is named after Hisinger. There is also Aluminian Hisingerite which is when one of the iron atoms is replaced by aluminum.

The mountain of Hisingerfjellet in Nathorst Land at Spitsbergen, Svalbard, is named after him.

== See also ==
- Bastnäs
