= Kukharenkoite-(Ce) =

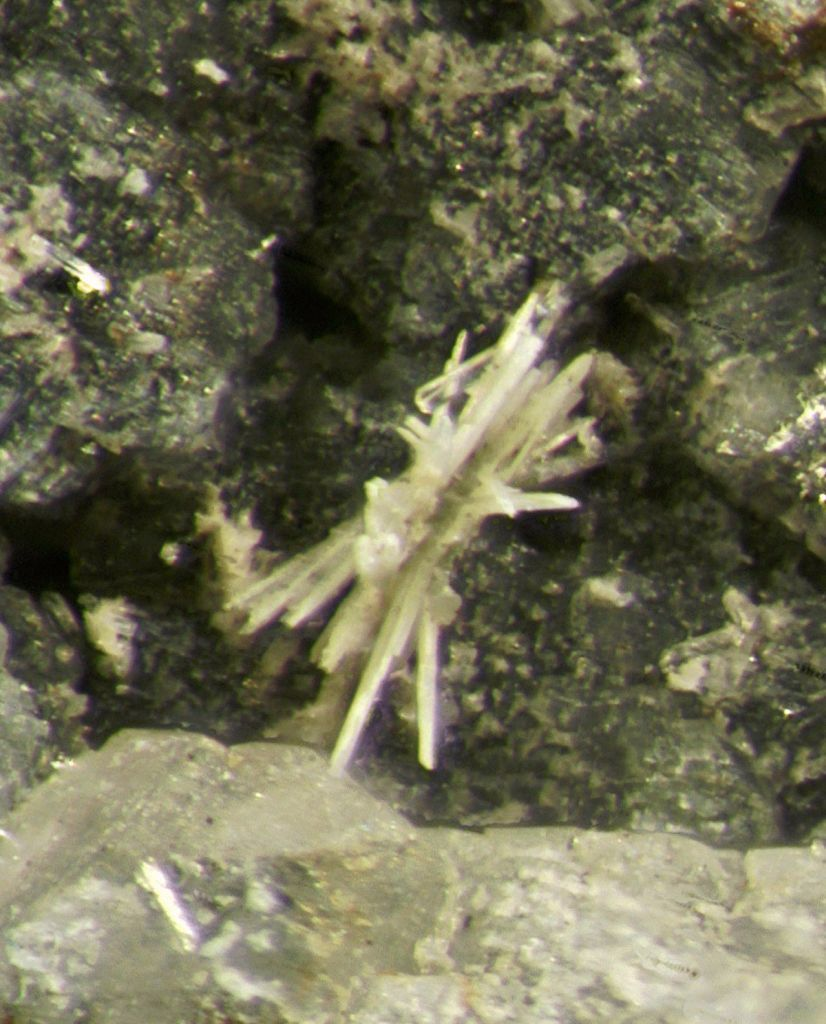
- Kukharenkoite-(Ce) from Demix-Varennes quarry, Montérégie, Québec

General
- Category: Carbonate minerals
- Formula: Ba_{2}CeF(CO_{3})_{3}
- IMA symbol: Kkk-Ce
- Strunz classification: 5.BD.10
- Crystal system: Monoclinic
- Crystal class: Prismatic (2/m) (same H-M symbol)
- Space group: P2_{1}/m

Identification

Kukharenkoite-(Ce) is a barium cerium fluoride carbonate mineral, formula Ba_{2}CeF(CO_{3})_{3}. It was identified from samples found in the Mont-Saint-Hilaire alkaline intrusive complex, Quebec, and the Khibiny Massif, Kola Peninsula, Russia. It was named for Russian mineralogist Alexander A. Kukharenko (1914–1993).

The similar zhonghuacerite, a cerium containing mineral from China, is considered to be either kukharenkoite-(Ce) or huanghoite-(Ce) rather than a valid mineral.

== See also ==
- List of minerals
- List of minerals named after people
