= Synchysite =

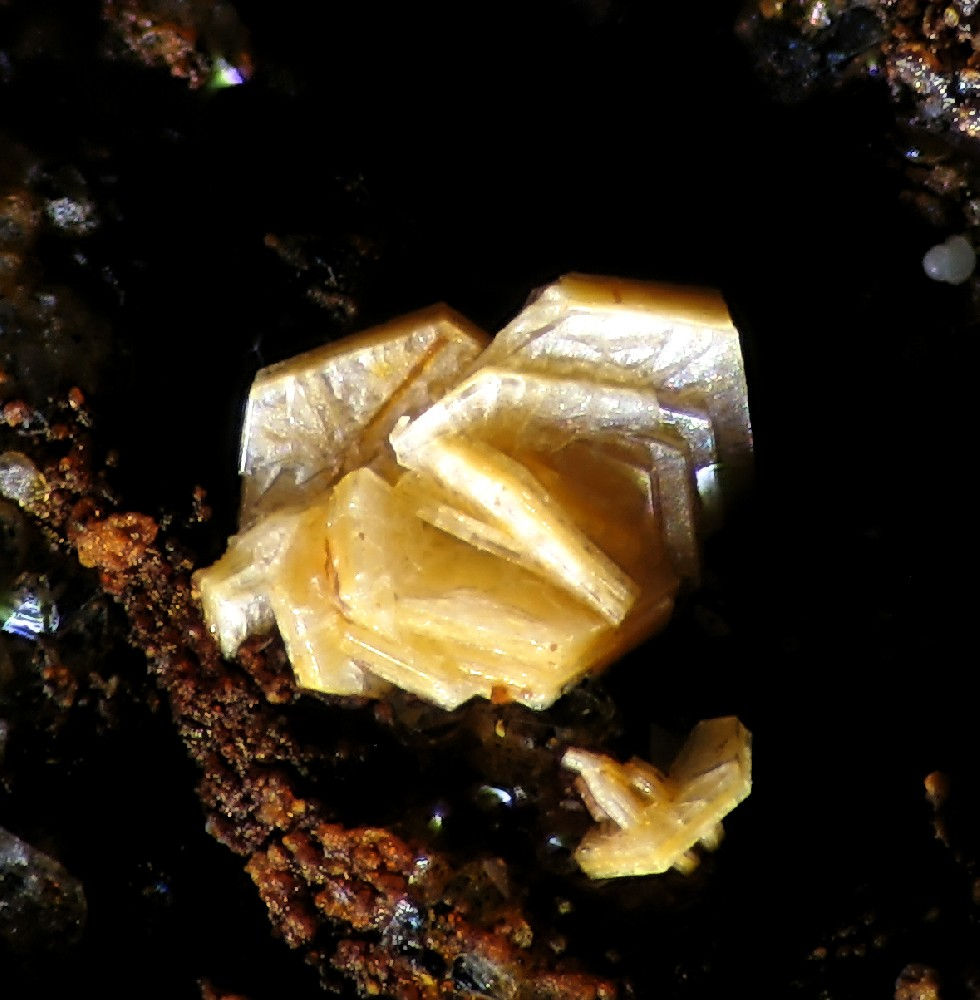
- A synchysite with unknown end-member composition

General
- Category: Minerals
- Formula: Ca(REE)(CO_{3})_{2}F
- Strunz classification: 5.BD.
- Crystal system: Monoclinic and trigonal
- Space group: C2/c (monoclinic)

Identification
- Mohs scale hardness: 4.5

Synchysite is a group of carbonate minerals. The three isostructural chemical end members are synchysite-(Ce), synchysite-(Nd) and synchysite-(Y). Huanghoite-(Ce) belongs to the group, but has a different symmetry and calcium is replaced by barium.

Synchesite group
Mineral name	Chemical formula	Symmetry	Space group
Huanghoite-(Ce)	BaCe(CO_{3})_{2}F	$3\;2/m$	$R\;\overline{3}\;m$
Synchysite-(Ce)	Ca(Ce,La)(CO_{3})_{2}F	$2/m$	$C\;2/c$
Synchysite-(Nd)	CaNd(CO_{3})_{2}F	$2/m$	$C\;2/c$
Synchysite-(Y)	CaY(CO_{3})_{2}F	$2/m$	$C\;2/c$
