= Riddarhyttan =

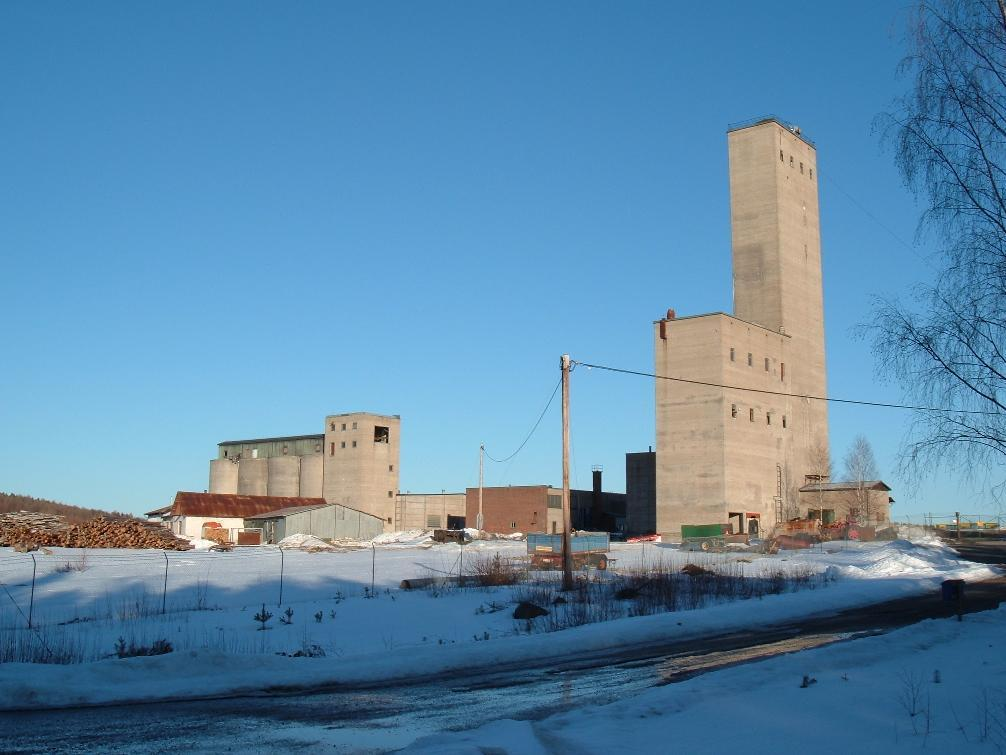
- Bäckegruvan in Riddarhyttan

- Location within Västmanland Location within Sweden
- Coordinates: 59°48′29″N 15°32′53″E
- Country: Sweden
- Province: Västmanland
- County: Västmanland County
- Municipality: Skinnskatteberg Municipality

Area
  - Total: 1.56 km^{2} (0.60 sq mi)

Population (31 December 2010)
  - Total: 431
  - Density: 276/km^{2} (710/sq mi)
- Time zone: UTC+1 (CET)
  - Summer (DST): UTC+2 (CEST)
- Website: www.riddarhyttan.nu

Riddarhyttan is a locality in Skinnskatteberg Municipality, Västmanland County, Sweden, with 431 inhabitants in 2010. It has an old iron mining tradition, which can be followed back to the last centuries before Christ. The last mine was closed down in 1979.

== Geography and geology ==
Riddarhyttan is, along with Skinnskatteberg, one of only two urban areas or localities (more than 200 inhabitants) in the Skinnskatteberg Municipality in the western part of Västmanland County, on the border to Örebro County. It is located in the north of the historical province of Västmanland. The area of the locality, as defined by Statistics Sweden, is 1.56 km^{2}.

The Swedish national road 68 is running through Riddarhyttan and the lake Lien is located next to it. It lies in the middle of the historically mining district Bergslagen. It is about 30 km to Fagersta, 35 km to Lindesberg and 70 km to Västerås.

When the last ice age in Bergslagen came to an end about 9,500 years ago, Riddarhyttan was located on the border between land and sea. That resulted in kettles, glacial erratics and other specific landforms. When the ice was melting, iron was released from the bedrock into the groundwater and became exposed iron oxide (ochre). That gave rise to a red-colour soil in some parts of Riddarhyttan, especially in the area called Röda Jorden (red earth).

== History ==
People started to extract iron from the red earth in the Riddarhyttan area sometime between 700 BCE and 400 BCE, which makes it the oldest area with ironworks in the Bergslagen region. Remains of several primitive blast furnaces have been found and the age have been established by carbon dating. The iron-making was carried on until about 0 CE.

The locality Riddarhyttan dates back to the Middle Ages. Hälsingegruvan and Munkhyttan was mentioned as early as 1420. It was the State that first commenced mining in the area but private persons, or Bergsmän, were granted to use the mines later on. In 1611, Thomas Hammarsmed was granted the right to erect a forge and an iron blast-furnace.
