= Kambalda type komatiitic nickel ore deposits =

Fe-Ni-Cu-PGE ore deposit

Kambalda type komatiitic nickel ore deposits are a class of magmatic iron-nickel-copper-platinum-group element ore deposit in which the physical processes of komatiite volcanology serve to deposit, concentrate and enrich a Fe-Ni-Cu-(PGE) sulfide melt within the lava flow environment of an erupting komatiite volcano.

== Definition ==
The classification of the type of ore environment sets these apart from other magmatic Ni-Cu-PGE ore deposits, which share many of the same genetic (formational) controls.

Kambalda-type ore deposits are distinctive in that the deposition of an immiscible Fe-Ni-Cu sulfide melt occurs within a lava flow channel upon the palaeosurface. This is distinct from other magmatic Ni-Cu-PGE deposits, where Fe-Ni-Cu sulfide melt accumulates within a subvolcanic feeder dike, sill, or magma chamber.

== Genetic model ==
The genetic model of Kambalda-type Ni-Cu-(PGE) ore deposits is similar that of many other magmatic Ni-Cu-PGE ore deposits:

- Metal source: komatiitic magma, which has been generated by high-degree partial melting of the mantle and which was strongly undersaturated in sulfide in the source (Wendlandt, 1982; see also Mavrogenes and O'Neill, 1999)
- Sulfur source: S-rich country rocks (sulfidic sediments and volcanic rocks), from which the sulfide is melted by the high-temperature komatiite magma
- Dynamic system: Ni-Cu-Co-PGE are chalcophile and will preferentially partition from the silicate melt into the sulfide melt. The metal tenors (abundances in 100% sulfide) are enhanced by the flushing of voluminous komatiitic melt across the sulfide accumulation.
- Physical trap: depressions in the footwall rocks, which may represent volcanic topographic irregularities modified by thermomechanical erosion. Sulfides within the komatiite lava flows are denser than the silicate melt and tend to pool within topographic lows, which may be enhanced in the lava channel by proposed thermal erosion of the substrate by the komatiite lava.

Recent research on the S isotopic compositions of komatiitic sulfides (Bekker et al., 2009) indicates that they lack the non-mass dependent isotope fractionation typical of sulfides formed at the surface during the Archaean, as would be expected if much of the sulfur was sourced from the sedimentary substrate, confirming that the S was derived 'upstream' in the system, not from the local country rocks.

== Volcanic setting ==
Komatiite-associated Ni-Cu-PGE deposits can form in a wide range of volcanic environments and overlie a wide range of footwall rocks, including basalts (e.g., Kambalda, Western Australia), andesites (e.g., Alexo, Ontario), dacites (e.g., Bannockburn, Ontario; Silver Swan, Western Australia), rhyolites (e.g., Dee's Flow, Ontario), sulfide facies iron-formations (e.g., Windarra, Western Australia), and sulfidic semi-pelites (e.g., Raglan, Quebec).

== Morphology ==
The morphology of Kambalda-type Ni-Cu-PGE deposits is distinctive because the Fe-Ni-Cu sulfides occur along the floor of a komatiite lava flow, concentrated within a zone of highest flow in the lava channel facies (Lesher et al., 1984).

The lava channel is typically recognised within a komatiite sequence by;

- Thickening of the basal flow of the komatiite sequence
- Increased MgO, Ni, Cu, and concomitant decrease in Zn, Cr, Fe, Ti as compared to 'flanking flows'
- A 'sediment free window' where sediment has been scoured or melted from the basal or footwall contact of the komatiite with the underlying substrate
- A trough morphology, which is recognisable by a reentrant flat and steep-sided embayment in the footwall underlying thickest cumulate piles

The ore zone typically consists, from the base upwards, of a zone of massive sulfides, matrix/net-textured sulfides, disseminated sulfides, and cloud sulfides.

Massive sulfides are not always present but where present are composed of >90% Fe-Ni-Cu sulfides occasionally with exotic enclaves of olivine, metasedimentary or melted material derived from the footwall to the lava flow. The massive sulfide normally sits upon a footwall of basalt or felsic volcanic rock, into which the massive sulfide may locally intrude, forming veins, interpillow sulfides, and interbreccia sulfides. Semi-massive sulfides are more common and are composed of 75–90% Fe-Ni-Cu sulfides with inclusions of olivine and wall rocks.

Net-textured sulfides (Canada) or matrix sulfides (Australia) are composed of 30–50% sulfide interstitial to olivine (typically serpentinized), which have been interpreted to have formed by static gravitational segregation, dynamic flow segregation, or capillary infiltration. This texture is well preserved in many areas (e.g., Alexo, Ontario; Kambalda, Western Australia; Raglan, New Quebec), but in high-grade metamorphic areas it has been replaced jackstraw texture, composed of bladed to acicular metamorphic olivines, which superficially resembles spinifex textured olivines, within a matrix of Fe-Ni-Cu sulfides.

Disseminated sulfides are the most common ore type and are composed of 5–30% Fe-Ni-Cu sulfides and grade upwards into subeconomic and barren olivine cumulate rocks. Lower grade zones are rarely economic to mine in the majority of komatiites, except when close to surface.

=== Ore localization ===
Type I Contact Ores: Ores along the basal contact are normally localized in footwall embayments, most of which have been deformed by superimposed deformation, but which in less-deformed areas range from broad shallow embayments (e.g., Alexo, Ontario) and shallow re-entrant embayments (e.g., many Kambalda ore bodies) to subcircular depressions (e.g., some Kamblada ore bodies, Raglan, Quebec).

Type II Internal Ores: Some deposits also contain or instead contain disseminated, blebby, or net-textured

- Interformational sulfides; So-called serp-serp ore which is developed off a thrust pinchout, or via remobilisation of massive sulfide along a shear surface or thrust which drags ore up off the contact into the serpentinitised komatiite. Serp-serp ore may, in some cases, be similar to interspinifex ore, the diagnostic spinifex textures often absent due to thermal erosion or metamorphic overprint, and can only be determined as such by comparison of chemistry of the ultramafics above and below.
- Basalt-basalt pinchout, or pinchout or Bas-bas ore, is developed during deformation by remobilisation of massive sulfide into the footwall via attenuation of the trough and structural re-closing. Bas-bas ore can be found up to 40–60 m into the footwall leading from a trough position.
- Interspinifex ore, developed on the upper contact of the basal flow and on the basal contact of a fertile second flow. In some cases, liquid sulfide from the second flow is seen intermingled intimately with spinifex-textured ultramafic flow tops of the basal flow (e.g.; Long-Victor Shoot, Kambalda) and may be present above remnant sediments and intermingled with remnant sediments (e.g.; Hilditch Prospect, Wannaway, Bradley Prospect, Location 1 and likely others).
- Remobilised ore. In rare cases, ore may be remobilised into a bas-bas or serp-serp position geometrically variant to the stratigraphy. Such examples include Waterloo-Amorac, Emily Ann, Wannaway and potentially other small pods of remobilised and structurally complicated sulfides (e.g., Wedgetail, in the Honeymoon Well complex). In most cases, sulfides move less than 100m, although in the case of Emily Ann, over 600m of displacement is known.

== Metamorphic overprint ==
Metamorphism is nearly ubiquitous within Archaean komatiites. The type locality for Kambalda-type Ni-Cu-PGE deposits has suffered several metamorphic events which have altered the mineralogy, textures and morphology of the komatiite-hosted ore.

Several key features of the metamorphic history affect the present-day morphology and mineralogy of the ore environments;

=== Prograde metamorphism ===
Prograde metamorphism to either greenschist facies or amphibolite facies tends to revert igneous olivine to metamorphic olivine, serpentinite or talc carbonated ultramafic schists.

In the ore environment, the metamorphism tends to remobilise the nickel sulfide which, during peak metamorphism, has the yield strength and behaviour of toothpaste as conceptualised by workers within the field. The massive sulfides tend to move tens to hundreds of meters away from their original depositional position into fold hinges, footwall sediments, faults or become caught up within asymmetric shear zones.

While sulfide minerals do not change their mineralogy during metamorphism as silicates do, the yield strength of the nickel sulfide pentlandite, and copper sulfide chalcopyrite is less than that of pyrrhotite and pyrite, resulting in a potential to segregate the sulfides mechanically throughout a shear zone.

=== Retrograde metamorphism ===
Ultramafic mineralogy is especially susceptible to retrograde metamorphism, especially when water is present. Few komatiite sequences display even pristine metamorphic assemblages, with most metamorphic olivine replaced by serpentine, anthophyllite, talc or chlorite. Pyroxene tends to retrogress to actinolite-cummingtonite or chlorite. Chromite may hydrothermally alter to stichtite, and pentlandite may retrogress into millerite or heazlewoodite.

== Supergene modification ==
Kambalda style komatiitic nickel mineralisation was initially discovered by gossan searching in ~1965, which discovered the Long, Victor, Otter-Juan and other shoots within the Kambalda Dome. The Redross, Widgie Townsite, Mariners, Wannaway, Dordie North and Miitel nickel gossans were identified generally at or around the time of drilling of the Widgiemooltha area beginning in 1985, and continuing till today.

Gossans of nickel mineralisation, especially massive sulfides, are dominated in the arid Yilgarn craton by boxworks of goethite, hematite, maghemite and ocher clays. Non-sulfide nickel minerals are typically soluble, and preserved rarely at surface as carbonates, although often can be preserved as nickel arsenates (nickeline) within gossans. Within subtropical and Arctic regions, it is unlikely gossans would be preserved or, if they are, would not contain carbonate minerals.

Minerals such as gaspeite, hellyerite, otwayite, widgiemoolthalite and related hydrous nickel carbonates are diagnostic of nickel gossans, but are exceedingly rare. More usually, malachite, azurite, chalcocite and cobalt compounds are more persistent in boxworks and may provide diagnostic information.

Nickel mineralisation in the regolith, in the upper saprolite typically exists as goethite, hematite, limonite and is often associated with polydymite and violarite, nickel sulfides which are of supergene association. Within the lower saprolite, violarite is transitional with unaltered pentlandite-pyrite-pyrrhotite ore.

== Exploration for Kambalda Ni-Cu-PGE ores ==
Exploration for Kambalda-style nickel ores focuses on identifying prospective elements of komatiite sequences via geochemistry, geophysical prospecting methods and stratigraphic analysis.

Geochemically, the Kambalda Ratio Ni:Cr/Cu:Zn identifies areas of enriched Ni, Cu and depleted Cr and Zn. Cr is associated with fractionated, low-MgO rocks and Zn is a typical sediment contaminant. If the ratio is at around unity or greater than 1, the komatiite flow is considered fertile. Other geochemical trends sought include high MgO contents to identify the area with highest cumulate olivine contents; identifying low-Zn flows; tracking Al content to identify contaminated lavas and, chiefly, identifying anomalously enriched Ni (direct detection). In many areas, economic deposits are identified within a halo of lower grade mineralisation, with a 1% or 2% Ni in hole value contoured.

Geophysically, nickel sulfides are considered effective superconductors in a geologic context. They are explored for using electromagnetic exploration techniques which measure the current and magnetic fields generated in buried and concealed mineralisation. Mapping of regional magnetic response and gravity is also of use in defining the komatiite sequences, though of little use in directly detecting the mineralisation itself.

Stratigraphic analysis of an area seeks to identify thickening basal lava flows, trough morphologies, or areas with a known sediment-free window on the basal contact. Likewise, identifying areas where cumulate and channelised flow dominates over apparent flanking thin flow stratigraphy, dominated by multiple thin lava horizons defined by recurrence of A-zone spinifex textured rocks, is effective at regionally vectoring in toward areas with the highest magma throughput. Finally, regionally it is common for komatiite sequences to be drilled in areas of high magnetic anomalism based on the inferred likelihood that increased magnetic response correlates with the thickest cumulate piles.

== General morphological phenomena ==
=== Parallel ore trends ===
One notable phenomena in and around the domes which host the majority of the komatiitic nickel ore deposits in Australia is the high degree of parallelism of the ore shoots, especially at the Kambalda Dome and Widgiemooltha Dome.

Ore shoots continue, in essential parallelism, for several kilometres down plunge; furthermore in some ore trends at Widgiemooltha, ore trends and thickened basal flow channels are mirrored by low-tenor and low-grade 'flanking channels'. These flanking channels mimic the sinuous meandering ore shoots. Why extremely hot and superfluid komatiitic lavas and nickel sulfides would deposit themselves in parallel systems can only be described by Horst-Graben type faulting which is commonly seen at rift zones.

=== Subvolcanic feeder vs. mega-channels ===
One of the major problems in classifying and identifying komatiite-hosted NiS ore deposits as Kambalda type is the structural complication and overprint of metamorphism upon the volcanic morphology and textures of the ore deposit.

This is especially true of the peridotite and dunite hosted low-grade disseminated Ni-Cu-(PGE) deposits such as Perseverance, Mount Keith MKD5, Yakabindie and Honeymoon Well, which occupy peridotite bodies which are at least 300m and up to 1200m thickness (or more).

The major difficulty in identifying adcumulate peridotite piles in excess of 1 km as being entirely volcanic is the difficulty in envisaging a komatiitic eruptive event which is prolonged enough to persist long enough to build up via accumulation such a thickness of olivine-only material. It is considered equally plausible that such large dunite-peridotite bodies represent lava channels or sills through which, perhaps, great volumes of lava flowed en route to the surface.

This is exemplified by the Mount Keith MKD5 orebody, near Leinster, Western Australia, which has recently been reclassified according to a subvolcanic intrusive model. Extremely thick olivine adcumulate piles were interpreted as representing a 'mega' flow channel facies, and it was only upon mining into a low-strain margin of the body at Mount Keith that an intact intrusive-type contact was discovered.

Similar thick adcumulate bodies of komatiitic affinity which have sheared or faulted-off contacts could also represent intrusive bodies. For example, the Maggie Hays and Emily Ann ore deposits, in the Lake Johnston Greenstone Belt, Western Australia, are highly structurally remobilised (up to 600 m into felsic footwall rocks) but are hosted in folded podiform adcumulate to mesocumulate bodies which lack typical spinifex flow-top facies and exhibit an orthocumulate margin. This may represent a sill or lopolith form of intrusion, not a channelised flow, but structural modification of the contacts precludes a definitive conclusion.

== Example ore deposits ==
Definitive Kambalda-type

- Kambalda-St Ives-Tramways district, Western Australia (including Durkin, Otter-Juan, Coronet, Long, Victor, Loreto, Hunt, Fisher, Lunnon, Foster, Lanfranci, and Edwin shoots)
- Carnilya Hill deposit, Western Australia
- Widgiemooltha Dome, Western Australia (including Miitel, Mariners, Redross, and Wannaway deposits)
- Forrestania belt, Western Australia (including Cosmic Boy, Flying Fox, and Liquid Acrobat deposits)
- Silver Swan deposit, Western Australia
- Raglan district, New Quebec (including Cross Lake, Zone 2–3, Katinniq, Zone 5–8, Zone 13–14, West Boundary, Boundary, and Donaldson deposits)

Intrusive equivalents

- Thompson Nickel Belt, Manitoba (including Birchtree, Pipe, and Thompson deposits)

Probable Kambalda-type

- Maggie Hays and Emily Ann, Lake Johnstone Greenstone Belt, Western Australia
- Waterloo Nickel Deposit, Agnew-Wiluna Greenstone Belt, Western Australia

== See also ==
- Komatiite
- Basalt
- Nickel
- Rock microstructure
- List of rock textures
- List of rock types
- Igneous rocks
- Definition of ultramafic rocks
- Cumulate rocks
