= Eucalyptus frenchiana =

Conservation status
- Priority Three — Poorly Known Taxa (DEC)

Scientific classification
- Kingdom: Plantae
- Clade: Tracheophytes
- Clade: Angiosperms
- Clade: Eudicots
- Clade: Rosids
- Order: Myrtales
- Family: Myrtaceae
- Genus: Eucalyptus
- Species: E. frenchiana

Binomial name
- Eucalyptus frenchiana D.Nicolle

Species of eucalyptus

Eucalyptus frenchiana is a species of mallet that is endemic to Western Australia. It has smooth bark, narrow lance-shaped, glossy green adult leaves, ribbed flower buds in groups of three, white flowers and ribbed, conical to cup-shaped fruit.

== Description ==
Eucalyptus frenchiana is a mallet that typically grows to a height of 6–14 m (20–46 ft) but does not form a lignotuber. It has smooth light grey over cream bark that is shed in ribbons. Young plants and coppice regrowth have slightly glossy light green leaves that are a paler colour on one side, egg-shaped and petiolate. Adult leaves are narrow lance-shaped, the same glossy green on both sides, 55–100 mm (2.2–3.9 in) long and 9–13 mm (0.35–0.51 in) wide and petiolate. The flower buds are arranged in leaf axils in groups of three on a peduncle 8–13 mm (0.31–0.51 in) long, the individual buds on pedicels 5–11 mm (0.20–0.43 in) long. Mature buds are 12–15 mm (0.47–0.59 in) long and 8–12 mm (0.31–0.47 in) wide, the hypanthium cup-shaped and the operculum hemispherical with prominent longitudinal ribs. The flowers are white and the fruit is a woody, conical to cup-shaped capsule 10–12 mm (0.39–0.47 in) long and 10–13 mm (0.39–0.51 in) wide with the valves near to rim level.

== Taxonomy and naming ==
Eucalyptus frenchiana was first formally described in 2009 by Dean Nicolle from a specimen he collected with Malcolm French west of Coolgardie, and the description was published in the journal Nuytsia. The specific epithet (frenchiana) honours French for his assistance in the preparation of the Nuytsia paper.

== Distribution and habitat ==
This mallet grows in mallet-mallee woodland near Lake Johnston in the Coolgardie biogeographic region.

== Conservation status ==
Eucalyptus frenchiana is classified as "Priority Three" by the Government of Western Australia Department of Parks and Wildlife meaning that it is poorly known and known from only a few locations but is not under imminent threat.

== See also ==
- List of Eucalyptus species
