= Eucalyptus distuberosa =

Scientific classification
- Kingdom: Plantae
- Clade: Tracheophytes
- Clade: Angiosperms
- Clade: Eudicots
- Clade: Rosids
- Order: Myrtales
- Family: Myrtaceae
- Genus: Eucalyptus
- Species: E. distuberosa

Binomial name
- Eucalyptus distuberosa Nicolle

Species of eucalyptus

Eucalyptus distuberosa is a species of mallet that is endemic to the south-west of Western Australia. It has smooth dark grey to tan-coloured or creamy white bark, glossy dark green, lance-shaped adult leaves, flower buds in groups of seven, white flowers and cup-shaped to conical fruit.

== Description ==
Eucalyptus distuberosa is a mallet that typically grows to a height of 5–14 m (16–46 ft) but does not form a lignotuber. It has smooth dark grey to tan-coloured or creamy-white bark that is shed in long ribbons. Adult leaves are glossy dark green, lance-shaped, 60–100 mm (2.4–3.9 in) long and 8–22 mm (0.31–0.87 in) wide on a petiole 10–15 mm (0.39–0.59 in) long. The flower buds are arranged in leaf axils, usually in groups of seven on an unbranched peduncle 5–13 mm (0.20–0.51 in) long, the individual buds on a pedicel 3–6 mm (0.12–0.24 in) long. Mature buds are oval to pear-shaped, 8–10 mm (0.31–0.39 in) long and 5–6 mm (0.20–0.24 in) wide with a conical to turban-shaped operculum. The flowers are white and the fruit is a woody cup-shaped to conical capsule, 5–8 mm (0.20–0.31 in) long and 6–8 mm (0.24–0.31 in) wide with the valves near the level of the rim.

== Taxonomy and naming ==
Eucalyptus distuberosa was first formally described in 2009 by Dean Nicolle and the description was published in the journal Nuytsia from a specimen he collected in 2000 north-east of Yellowdine. The specific epithet (distuberosa) is derived from the Latin words dis meaning "without" or "not" and tuberosus meaning "full of lumps", referring to the lack of a lignotuber in this species.

There are two subspecies recognised by the Australian Plant Census:

- Eucalyptus distuberosa subsp. aerata that has prominently ribbed buds and fruit;
- Eucalyptus distuberosa subsp. distuberosa that lacks ornamentation on the buds and fruit, although intermediates are known.

== Distribution ==
This mallet grows in mallee mainly between Yellowdine, the Frank Hann National Park and Norseman in the Avon Wheatbelt, Coolgardie and Mallee biogeographic regions of Western Australia. Subspecies aerata is only known from the Bronzite Ridge between Lake Johnston and Norseman.

== Conservation status ==
Eucalyptus distuberosa subsp. distuberosa is classified as "not threatened" by the Western Australian Government Department of Parks and Wildlife but subspecies aerata is classified as "Priority One" meaning that it is known from only one or a few locations which are potentially at risk.

== See also ==
- List of Eucalyptus species
