= Black Swan Nickel Mine =

Former nickel mine in Western Australia

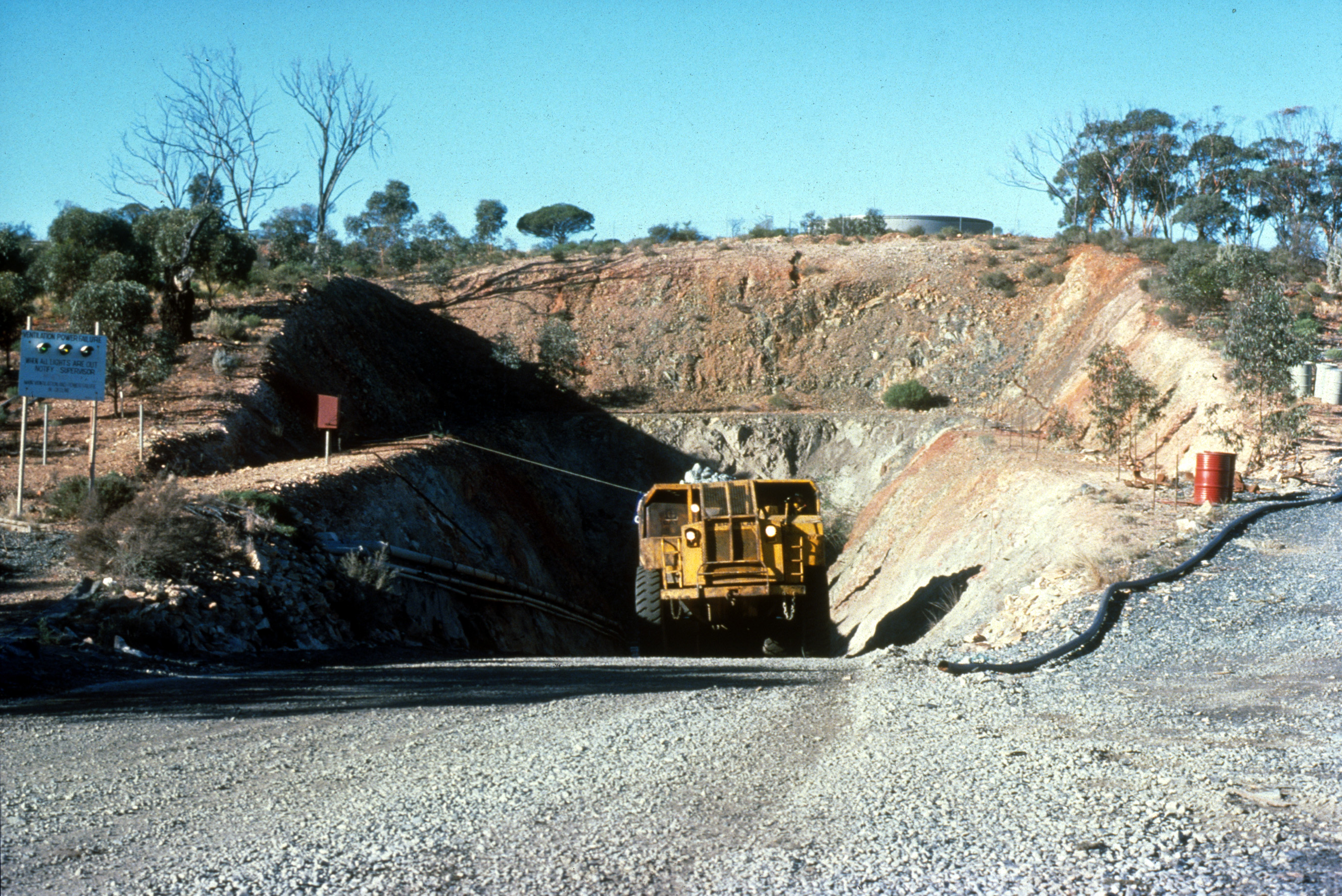
- The Silver Swan Nickel Mine in 2003

- Location in Western Australia
- Interactive map of Black Swan Nickel Mine
- Location: Kanowna, Western Australia, Australia; 30°23′S 121°28′E
- Products: Nickel
- Opened: 1997
- Active: 1997–2008
- Company: Poseidon Nickel
- Website: Poseidon Nickel website
- Acquired: 2014

Black Swan Nickel Mine is an inactive surface and underground nickel mine near Kanowna, Western Australia.

The mine operated from 1997 to 2008, at which point it was placed into care and maintenance. It is owned by Poseidon Nickel, who aims to restart production at Black Swan.

== History ==
The nickel deposit at Black Swan was discovered in the 1960s but was not developed at the time. The mine, owned by MPI Mines Limited at the time, began production in 1997, first as an underground operation, named Silver Swan, later as an open pit mine as well.

The development of the Silver Swan Mine cost A$46 million and first ore to Outokumpu's smelter in Finland was delivered in May 1997. The mine was estimated at the time to produce 10,000 tonnes of nickel annually.

With the completion of mining at the Flying Fox Mine in 1998, Outokumpu transferred the process plant from there to Black Swan. Additionally, the existing process plant at Black Swan was upgraded at a cost of A$13 million with the aim of increasing annual nickel production to 18,000 tonnes.

In the 2000s, the mine saw frequent changes of ownership, including Finnish company Outokumpu until 2002, followed by MPI Mines Limited, which had already been involved in the project earlier, Lionore from 2004 and Norilsk Nickel from 2007. Norilsk acquired the mine through a takeover of Lionore, but soon after, in late 2008 and early 2009, low nickel prices forced a number of mines in Western Australia to close, including Black Swan. The mine, which had employed over 500 people during operations, was placed in care and maintenance.

During its 11-year operation, the mine produced 41,000 tonnes of nickel from the Black Swan open pit and 138,000 tonnes from the Silver Swan underground operation. Grades for the nickel ore during this time were 0.7 percent for the open pit operation and 5.1 percent for the underground.

Poseidon Nickel eventually acquired the mine in 2014–15, having purchased the also inactive Emily Ann and Maggie Hays nickel mines the previous year. The company announced in late 2022 that it was aiming to restart production at the mine in 2024.
