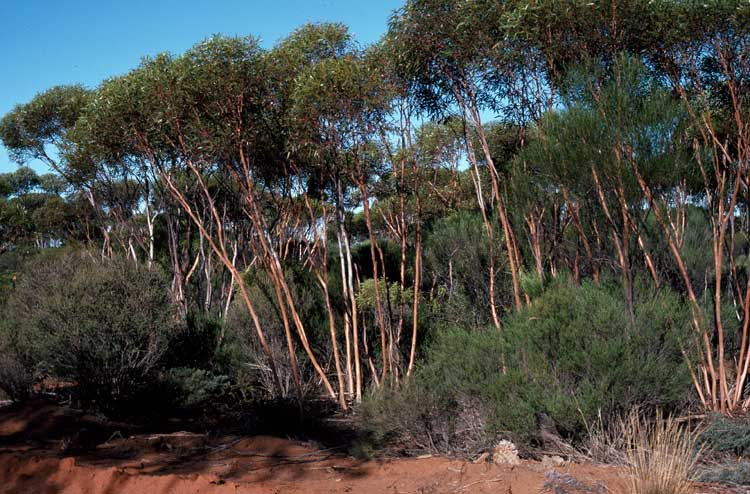

Conservation status
- Vulnerable (IUCN 3.1)

- Priority Four — Rare Taxa (DEC)

Scientific classification
- Kingdom: Plantae
- Clade: Tracheophytes
- Clade: Angiosperms
- Clade: Eudicots
- Clade: Rosids
- Order: Myrtales
- Family: Myrtaceae
- Genus: Eucalyptus
- Species: E. cerasiformis

Binomial name
- Eucalyptus cerasiformis Brooker & Blaxell

= Eucalyptus cerasiformis =

Cherry-fruited mallee

Species of eucalyptus

Eucalyptus cerasiformis, commonly known as the cherry-fruited mallee, is a mallee that is endemic to a small area of Western Australia. It has smooth, pale grey, sometimes powdery bark, lance-shaped adult leaves, flower buds in groups of seven, pale yellow or whitish flowers and cylindrical or bell-shaped fruit.

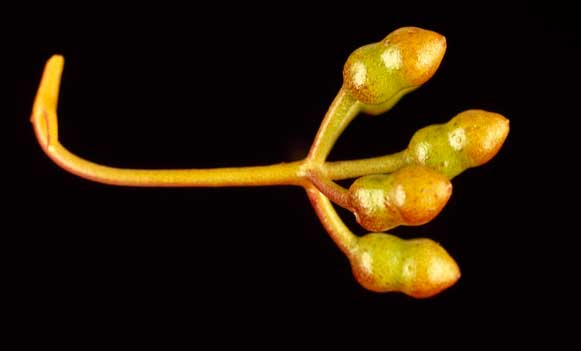
Buds

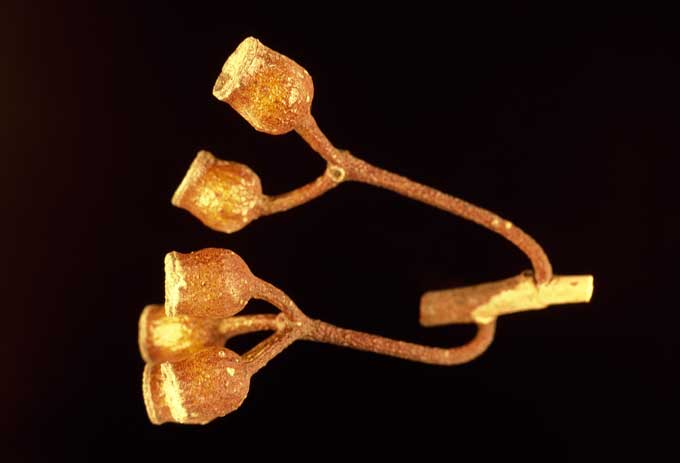
Fruit

== Description ==
Eucalyptus cerasiformis is a mallee that typically grows to a height of 2 to 3.5 metres (7 to 11 ft) and has smooth, pale grey and white, sometimes powdery bark. The adult leaves are thin and the same glossy, grey-green on both sides. The leaf blade is narrow lance-shaped, 50–112 mm (2.0–4.4 in) long and 5–14 mm (0.20–0.55 in) wide on a petiole 8–20 mm (0.31–0.79 in) long. The flower buds are borne in groups of seven in leaf axils on a thin peduncle 18–50 mm (0.71–1.97 in) long, the individual buds on a pedicel 7–16 mm (0.28–0.63 in) long. Mature buds are more or less cylindrical, 9–11 mm (0.35–0.43 in) long and 5–6 mm (0.20–0.24 in) wide with a conical to rounded operculum with a point on the tip. Flowering occurs between December and March and the flowers are pale yellow or whitish. The fruit is a woody cylindrical, bell-shaped, urn-shaped or hemispherical capsule.

== Taxonomy and naming ==
Eucalyptus cerasiformis was first formally described in 1978 by Ian Brooker and Donald Blaxell from a specimen collected by Blaxell near the Hyden - Norseman Road, 164 km (102 mi) east of Hyden. The description was published in the journal Nuytsia. The specific epithet (cerasiformis) is derived from the Latin cerasus meaning "cherry-tree" and -formis meaning "shape", referring to the hanging flower buds resembling a bunch of cherries.

== Distribution and habitat ==
Cherry-fruited mallee is only known from the type location, just north of Lake Johnston where it grows in low, open forest in red-loamy soils.

== Conservation status ==
This eucalypt is classified as "Priority Four" by the Government of Western Australia Department of Parks and Wildlife, meaning that is rare or near threatened.

== See also ==
- List of Eucalyptus species
