= Forrestania Operation =

Nickel mine in Western Australia

- Location in Western Australia
- Interactive map of Forrestania Operation
- Location: Forrestania,Western Australia, Australia; Cosmic Boy Concentrator: 32°35′S 119°44′E Flying Fox Mine: 32°25′S 119°41′E Spotted Quoll Mine: 32°29′S 119°41′E
- Products: Nickel
- Production: 22,915 tonnes
- Financial year: 2022–23
- Opened: Flying Fox: 1992 Spotted Quoll: 2009
- Active: Flying Fox: 1992–1998 & 2006–present Spotted Quoll: 2009–present
- Company: IGO Limited
- Website: IGO website
- Acquired: 2022

Forrestania Operation is an underground nickel mine at Forrestania, 80 kilometres (50 mi) east-southeast of Hyden, in the Shire of Kondinin, Western Australia.

The mine, which consists of two deposits, Flying Fox and Spotted Quoll, is operated by IGO Limited, having taken over the previous owner, Western Areas, in 2022. The mine is located on the native title lands of the Maduwongga, Marlinyu Ghoolie and Ngadju people.

== History ==
=== Flying Fox mine ===
The Flying Fox mine opened in 1992, then operated by Finnish company Outokumpu and was in production until 1998. It subsequently reopened in 2006, now under the ownership of Western Areas.

Prior to opening, the mine was projected to produce 7,500 tonnes of nickel annually. Start up of production at the mine coincident with a decline of nickel prices due to oversupply of the market. At the time, the Forrestania mine was the only nickel mine operational in Western Australia not owned by WMC Resources. During the 1993–94 financial year, mining operations at Forrestania moved from open pit to underground.

Once ore reserves at the mine had been depleted, having produced in excess of 50,000 tonnes of nickel, Outokumpu closed the operation and moved the process plant to its new Black Swan Nickel Mine, with all production from Forrestania having been processed at the company's Harjavalta nickel smelter in Finland. The mine was officially closed in September 1999.

In April 2002, Western Areas NL purchased a 75 percent interest in the Forrestania Nickel Project from Outokumpu.

By 2006, Western Areas, constructed a new nickel concentrator at Forrestania while recommencing production from the Flying Fox mine. Early production, prior to opening its new concentrator, was toll-treated at the Emily Ann process plant, 90 kilometres (56 mi) to the east.

=== Spotted Quoll mine ===
The nickel deposit of the Spotted Quoll mine was discovered in 2007, but exploration for nickel in the area by Western Areas Limited had been reported as early as 2001–02. Mining commenced two years later, in 2009. Initially, mining was carried out in an open pit operation which moved underground from 2011.

Commencement of construction of facilities at the Spotted Quoll mine was announced in 2008–09 and was scheduled to be the second of five potential mining location for nickel as part of the Forrestania Operation.

=== Forrestania Operation ===
Ore from the two operations is treated at the Cosmic Boy Concentrator, located 18 kilometres (11 mi) south of Flying Fox, with the Spotted Quoll Mine located between the two. Construction of the Cosmic Boy Concentrator as the central processing hub commenced in April 2008. As part of the expansion from one mining location, Flying Fox, to two with the development of Spotted Quoll, the annual processing capacity of the concentrator was enlarged from 300,000 tonnes to 550,000. The investment at Spotted Quoll and the concentrator enlargement was projected to cost A$61.5 million.

By 2010, the Forrestania Operation employed almost 300 people and was scheduled to reach an annual production of 35,000 tonnes of nickel by the following year. While the number of employees rose to over 500 by 2013, further expansion of the concentrator and development of other mines was placed on hold at this point as the global nickel price had declined.

In 2022, IGO Limited took over fellow mining company Western Areas at a cost of A$1.26 billion, of which IGO financed A$900 million through loans and the remainder through its own capital. The acquisition included the inactive Cosmos Nickel Mine and the Forrestania Operation, with IGO already operating the Nova Mine.

In 2016–17, the concentrator at Forrestania recorded its highest throughput yet, processing 618,000 tonnes, above nameplate capacity.

In 2021–22, its final period under Western Areas, the mine produced 14,028 tonnes of nickel.

== Production ==
Recent annual production of the mine:

Year	Nickel (tonnes)	Grade (Percent)	Cash cost (A$ per lb)
2017–18	24,442	4.0	2.63
2018–19	23,208	4.2	2.98
2019–20	23,291	3.9	3.13
2020–21	16,812	3.2	4.23
2021–22	14,028		8.02
2022–23	22,915	2.53	9.65
