= Emily Ann and Maggie Hays nickel mines =

Nickel mines in Western Australia

- Location in Western Australia
- Interactive map of Emily Ann and Maggie Hays nickel mines
- Location: Lake Johnston, Western Australia, Western Australia, Australia; 32°12′30″S 120°29′21″E
- Products: Nickel
- Production: 0
- Financial year: 2021
- Opened: 2001
- Closed: 2009
- Company: Poseidon Nickel
- Website: https://poseidon-nickel.com.au/
- Acquired: 2014

The Emily Ann and Maggie Hays nickel deposits are situated 117 km west of the town of Norseman, Western Australia, within the Lake Johnston Greenstone Belt.

The mines had been operational since 2001 when Nornickel suspended mining at Emily Ann and Maggie Hays in early 2009 because of drastically falling nickel prices. Poseidon Nickel acquired the Lake Johnston Nickel Project from Norilsk in 2014.

== Discovery ==
The Maggie Hays deposit was developed in 1996 by LionOre. It was discovered by prospecting in the 1970s by Anaconda Co. and Union Miniere, who had first located a nickel geochemical anomaly and drilled the disseminated halo, but missed the lucrative high-grade massive sulfide mineralisation by as little as three metres.

The recognition of the Maggie Hays orebody by LionOre geologists in the late 1990s was based upon electromagnetic geophysical surveys and deep diamond drilling of conductive anomalies. LionOre geologists credited the discovery to recognition of the electromagnetic response and drilling of the anomaly, however it is widely recognised that the initial discovery was based upon literature research and the fact that in the late 1970s and 1980s Union Miniere/Anaconda relinquished the tenements in a period of unfavourably low nickel prices.

Reassessment of the geophysical signature at Maggie Hays indicates that the hangingwall banded iron formation is as conductive as the massive sulfides, and that on this basis, as well as the steep orientation of the massive nickel sulfides, Maggie Hays is essentially blind to discovery.

The Emily Ann orebody is situated approximately 1200 m north of the Maggie Hays orebody and was drilled first in 1998 after a prolonged and saturated effort to electromagnetically prospect the entire prospective belt. The Emily Ann orebody was unequivocally discovered by geophysical surveying, the result of a flatter orientation of the orebody, the fact it is hosted within conductively dead felsic gneiss, and the depth of the upper parts of the orebody reaching to within 200m of the surface.

The Emily Ann discovery was a technical triumph, because it is a mechanically displaced recumbent fold of sheared massive sulfide hosted several hundred metres off the original ultramafic-felsic contact in a position not generally expected to host nickel sulfides.

== Regional geology ==
The Maggie Hays and Emily Ann orebodies are hosted within a komatiitic belt of rocks within the Archaean c. 2.85 Ga Lake Johnston Greenstone Belt (LJGB). There are three ultramafic horizons recognised within the LJGB stratigraphy: the Eastern, Central, and Western ultramafic. The entirety of the belt's nickel endowment is hosted within the Central Ultramafic Unit, known as the "CUU". However, disseminated and low tenor nickel mineralisation is known from the other ultramafic units, especially the Western Ultramafic Unit.

The general stratigraphy of the belt is, from base upwards, a thick sequence of felsic orthogneiss composed of fragmental to glomerocrystic feldspar gneiss, known as the footwall felsic sequence; the ultramafic units of komatiite affinity, "overlain" by grunerite-magnetite-quartz-amphibole banded iron formation of the Honman Formation, tholeiitic basalt and metasedimentary rocks.

Regionally, several subvolcanic lopolithic layered intrusions have been identified from mapping and drilling. These are interpreted to represent the feeder conduits to extrusive ultramafic and mafic igneous rocks stratigraphically higher in the belt. Examples include the Medcalf Ultramafic Intrusion, a 3.5 km long, ~1 km thick pile of gabbroic to pyroxenitic cumulates which contain subeconomic stratiform vanadiferous magnetite deposits.

The extrusive and intrusive igneous rocks are underlain and intruded by a series of I-type granite intrusions and granite domes of c. 2.65 Ga age. A late dyke swarm of Proterozoic age intrudes the belt, most notably the Jimberlana Dyke which attains a thickness of some 600m and transects the Emily Ann and Maggie Hays orebodies.

The Lake Johnston Greenstone Belt is metamorphosed to amphibolite facies, and in parts is extremely highly strained. Structurally the belt is composed of overturned west-vergent isoclinal fold trains, separated by thrusts. Deformation intensity is heterogeneous, ranging from weak foliation overprints to extreme 10:1 or 20:1 l-tectonite mylonite development.

== Mining ==
Production at Emily Ann began in late 2001, with the mine being owned by LionOre. Maggie Hays, 3 km south of Emily Ann, at that time, was owned partly by LionOre and BHP. Mining at the deposit was started after the conclusion of the ramping up of Emily Ann.

LionOre was taken over by Nornickel in June 2007 and, with it, all its Australian operations.

Norilsk suspended all Australian nickel operations, consisting of Emily Ann, Maggie Hays, the Black Swan nickel mine, the Cawse nickel mine and the Waterloo nickel mine in early 2009 because of drastically falling nickel prices.

== Maggie Hays mine geology ==
The Maggie Hays orebody sits upon the upper surface of an overturned sequence of komatiitic ultramafic cumulates dipping west at between 65 and 75 degrees. The ultramafic body is in the form of a "keel", with a southward plunging folded surface pinching out the northern end of the resource, where it enters a heterogeneously sheared structure. The ultramafic sequence is folded at its down-dip termination, where it enters a shear, with remobilised sulfides forming a discontinuous remobilised stringer ore zone of low grade.

A proposed "shelf fault" terminates the down dip portion of the ultramafic in the south of the Maggie Hays portion of the CUU, however it is equally likely that a porpoising hinge to the syncline could equally well explain the apparent truncation of the depth of the orebody in the south.

The ultramafic unit is a massive serpentinite, likely of mesocumulate to adcumulate composition. Peak metamorphic assemblages were in the amphibolite facies, with development of metamorphic olivine-anthophyllite-pyroxene assemblages. Retrograde metamorphism has occurred, leaving a serpentine-anthophyllite/cummingtonite-talc assemblage, with some areas of talc-carbonation.

The internal structure of the ultramafic includes some interesting features, notably a so-called "chill-zone" of assumed orthocumulate composition, which occupies the marginal facies of the ultramafic unit. This chill zone may represent a chill zone which infers an intrusive origin for the ultramafic, or it may represent a zone of metasomatism and/or contamination.

The orebody itself is composed of two to six metres of massive nickeliferous sulfides, usually banded and foliated pentlandite-pyrrhotite-pyrite. Dodecahedral pyrite crystals to 20 cm are formed within the massive sulfide zones. The massive zone is overlain by a matrix ore zone composed of the above sulfide assemblage and coarse jackstraw textured bladed olivine, now retrogressed to black serpentinite. This is in turn overlain by stringy-beef textured recrystallised disseminated ore zones containing retrogressed metamorphic olivine and distinctive bladed anthophyllite.

The structural overprint of the ultramafics and orebody by deformation during prograde metamorphism is a matter of debate, however the ductile nature of the deformation has affected the ultramafic CUU heterogenously and contrasts with the felsic footwall. The felsic footwall is subject to a pronounced stretching lineation which increases in intensity to the north. The lineation orientation is a uniform 65 degrees toward 120 degrees. Approaching the CUU body, the lineation breaks down into a zone of heavy boudinage and oblique shear with a pronounced C-S shear fabric, especially in the remobilised massive sulfides and at the leading edge of the keel structure. This is interpreted to occur due to competency contrast between the felsic footwall and the ultramafic unit.

== Emily Ann mine geology ==
The Emily Ann orebody is a folded and highly mylonitized shear-hosted nickel sulfide and ultramafic unit, in the form of an open overturned synclinal structure plunging shallowly north-east. This synclinal structure has a lower limb dipping 30 degrees east, and an upper limb dipping between 40 and 60 degrees east.

The Emily Ann sulfides are hosted within a discontinuously boudinaged ultramafic unit sandwiched within the felsic footwall units, a position considered to be the product of inclusion within a shear. The sulfides are concentrated within boudin necks between ultramafic boudins and lozenges.

The morphology and position of the Emily Ann sulfides and ultramafics are unique and somewhat controversial. At its simplest, magmatic nickel sulfides are not usually found displaced so far into the footwall as at Emily Ann, where the material has moved up to 600m off the basal contact of the ultramafic unit. Models used to explain the shape and form of the orebody include:

- Attenuation of thickness during ductile deformation and movement into the footwall along a shear
- Folding of the resultant shear-hosted nickel sulfide and boudinage of the ultramafic unit during shearing

== See also ==
- Kambalda type komatiitic nickel ore deposits
- Yilgarn craton
