= Cosmos Nickel Mine =

Former nickel mine in Western Australia

- Location in Western Australia
- Interactive map of Cosmos Nickel Mine
- Location: Leinster, Western Australia, Australia; 27°35′22″S 120°34′53″E
- Products: Nickel
- Opened: 2000
- Active: 2000–2012
- Company: IGO Limited
- Website: IGO website
- Acquired: 2022

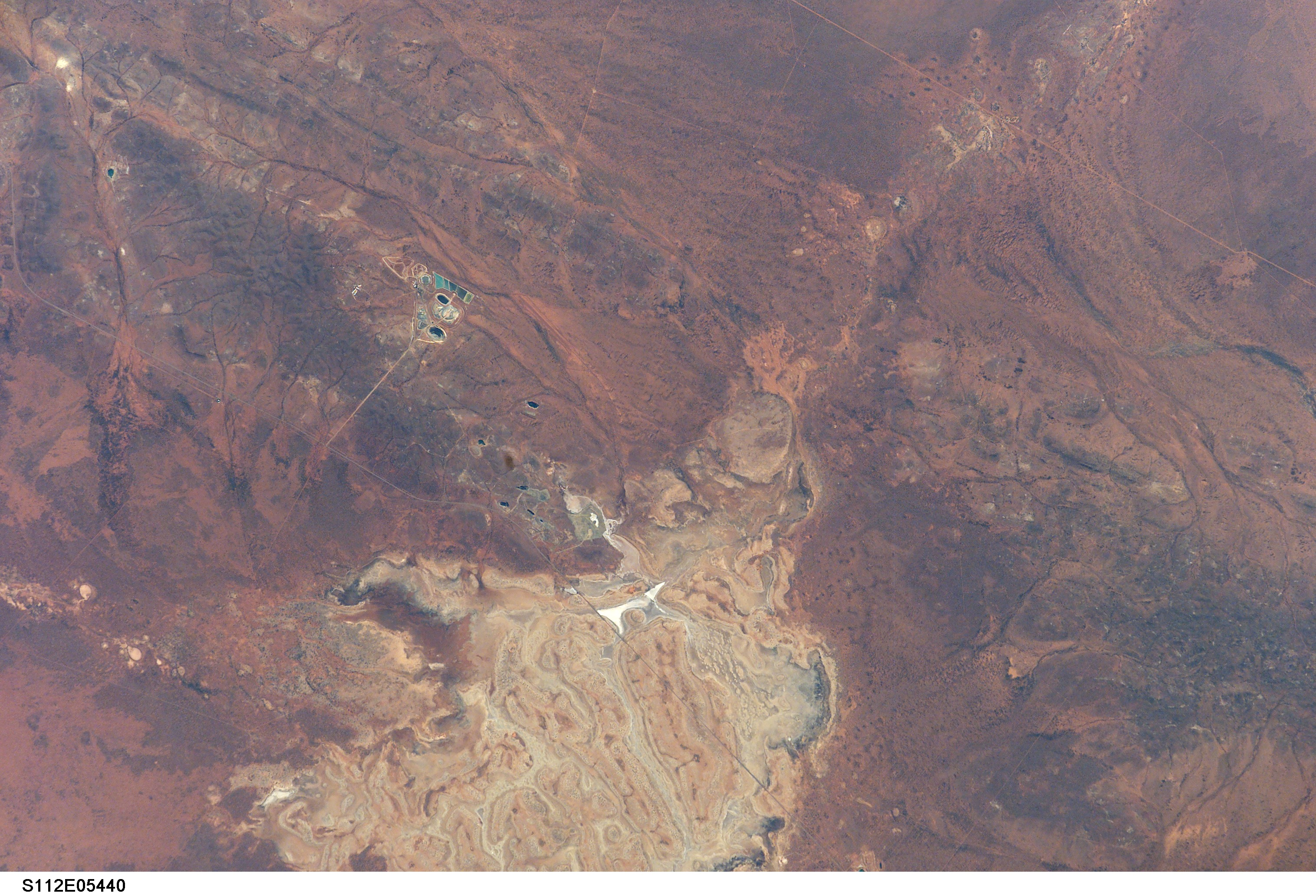
Satellite image of the Cosmos Nickel Mine on 14 October 2022.

Cosmos Nickel Mine is a currently inactive surface and underground nickel mine 38 km (24 mi) north-north-west of Leinster, Western Australia, along the Goldfields Highway.

The traditional owners of the land the mine is located on are the Tjiwarl people.

== History ==
The Cosmos nickel deposit was discovered in 1997 by Jubilee Gold Mines NL, originally a gold explorer which had switched to nickel exploration the previous year. The Cosmos deposit stood out for its high-grade nickel ore, averaging between five and twelve percent where most other nickel mines in Western Australia operate at a one to three percent grade.

Jubilee Gold planned to invest A$52 million in the project, of which A$38 million would go towards the construction of a concentrator. In 1998, the company estimated an initial mine life of three years and a production of 30,000 tonnes of nickel in this time. While mining was initially envisioned to be surface only, an expansion to potential underground mining was announced in the following year. Mining at Cosmos commenced in 2000 and, in 2004–05, the mine transitioned from a surface to an underground mining operation. In 2007, Jubilee Gold, and thereby the mine, were acquired by Xstrata for A$3.1 billion, at a time when nickel prices had surged. Shortly after the purchase by Xstrata, nickel prices crashed and, in 2012, the mine was placed in care and maintenance. During its twelve years of operation, the Cosmos Nickel Mine produced 127,000 tonnes of nickel in concentrate at a grade of 4.8 percent. At its peak, in 2011, the mine employed over 300 people, compared to just four in 2014, when in care and maintenance.

Xstrata was taken over by Glencore in 2015, which soon after sold the mine to Western Areas for A$24.5 million.

Western Areas, in turn, was taken over by IGO Limited at a cost of A$1.26 billion in 2022. Of this, IGO financed A$900 million through loans and the remainder through its own capital. Apart from Cosmos, the acquisition also included Western Areas' Forrestania nickel operations in addition to its own Nova nickel-copper-cobalt operation.

Shortly after the purchase, IGO announced that, to restart the operation and increase the concentrator size at Cosmos from 750,000 to one million tonnes per annum, an A$825 million investment was needed, three times the original estimate by the previous owner. At the time, IGO estimated that nickel production at Cosmos would recommence in 2024.

Mining at Cosmos is planned to be centred around the Odysseus mine, which is expected to have a mine life of ten years and to produce over 10,000 tonnes of nickel per annum.
