= Nova Mine =

Copper-Cobalt-Nickel mine in Western Australia

- Location in Western Australia
- Interactive map of Nova Mine
- Location: Fraser Range, Western Australia, Australia; 31°49′S 123°10′E
- Products: Cobalt Copper Nickel
- Production: Nickel: 22,915 tonnes Cooper: 10,266 tonnes Cobalt: 803 tonnes
- Financial year: 2022–23
- Opened: 2017
- Active: 2017–present
- Company: IGO Limited
- Website: IGO website
- Acquired: 2015

Nova Mine or Nova Operation is an underground cobalt, copper and nickel mine at Fraser Range, 160 kilometres (99 mi) east-northeast of Norseman, in the Shire of Dundas, Western Australia.

The mine opened in 2015 and consists of two underground ore deposits, Bollinger and Nova, and is operated by IGO Limited. The mine is located on the traditional land of the Ngadju people.

== History ==
The first of the two deposits, Nova, was discovered in July 2012 while the second one, Bollinger, was discovered the following year in February. The native title of the land the mine operates on is held by the Ngadju people, their claim to traditional ownership having been recognised by the Federal Court of Australia on 21 November 2014.

The project was originally owned by Sirius Resources, formerly Croesus Mining, which commenced construction of the mine in January 2015. Construction of the mine was budgeted at A$443 million, with a start date of 2017 for production. Sirius envisioned an annual production of 6,000 tonnes of nickel, 11,500 tonnes of copper and 850 tonnes of cobalt at the mine. Four month later, in May 2015, Independence Group made a A$1.8 billion takeover bid for Sirius. In September 2015, the transaction was approved by the shareholders of Sirius, prospector Mark Creasy holding a 35 percent interest in the company, but the transaction excluded the company's gold assets, which were transferred to a new company, S2 Resources, instead.

The start date for production was subsequently brought forward to late 2016 by the new owners, Independence Group, with construction costs reported to be within budged.

Once the mine was operational, ore was processed through BHP's Kambalda Nickel Concentrator. The mine eventually reached commercial production in July 2017 and full nameplate production three month later.

On 18 September 2019, Ricky Hanson (57), a truck driver, died from head injuries he had received at the mine on 11 September while operating the trailer covering system on the second trailer of a road train.

In January 2020, Independence Group NL changed its name to IGO Limited.

In 2022, IGO Limited took over fellow mining company Western Areas at a cost of A$1.26 billion, of which IGO financed A$900 million through loans and the remainder through its own capital. The acquisition included the inactive Cosmos Nickel Mine and the Forrestania Nickel Operations.

In 2021–22, the mine produced 26,675 tonnes of nickel as well as 11,483 tonnes of cooper and 982 of cobalt. Nova's grades were 1.85 percent for nickel, 0.75 percent for copper and 0.07 percent for cobalt. The mine had a revenue of A$900 million, of which just over 50 percent were profit.

In December 2022, the mine had to be closed for a number of weeks after a fire destroyed the diesel engine room at Nova. The mine was eventually restarted after 18 days, on 21 December 2022, after 14.9MW of temporary power generators had been installed on site.

== Production ==
Annual production of the mine:

Year	Nickel (tonnes)	Copper (tonnes)	Cobalt (tonnes)	Cash cost (A$ per lb)
2017–18	22,258	9,545	740	2.78
2018–19	30,708	13,693	1,090	2.07
2019–20	30,436	13,772	1,142	2.41
2020–21	29,002	13,022	1,084	1.85
2021–22	26,675	11,483	982	1.95
2022–23	22,915	10,266	803	3.54
Overall 2016–2023	161,994	71,781	5,841	N/A
