= Komatiite =

Magnesium-rich igneous rock

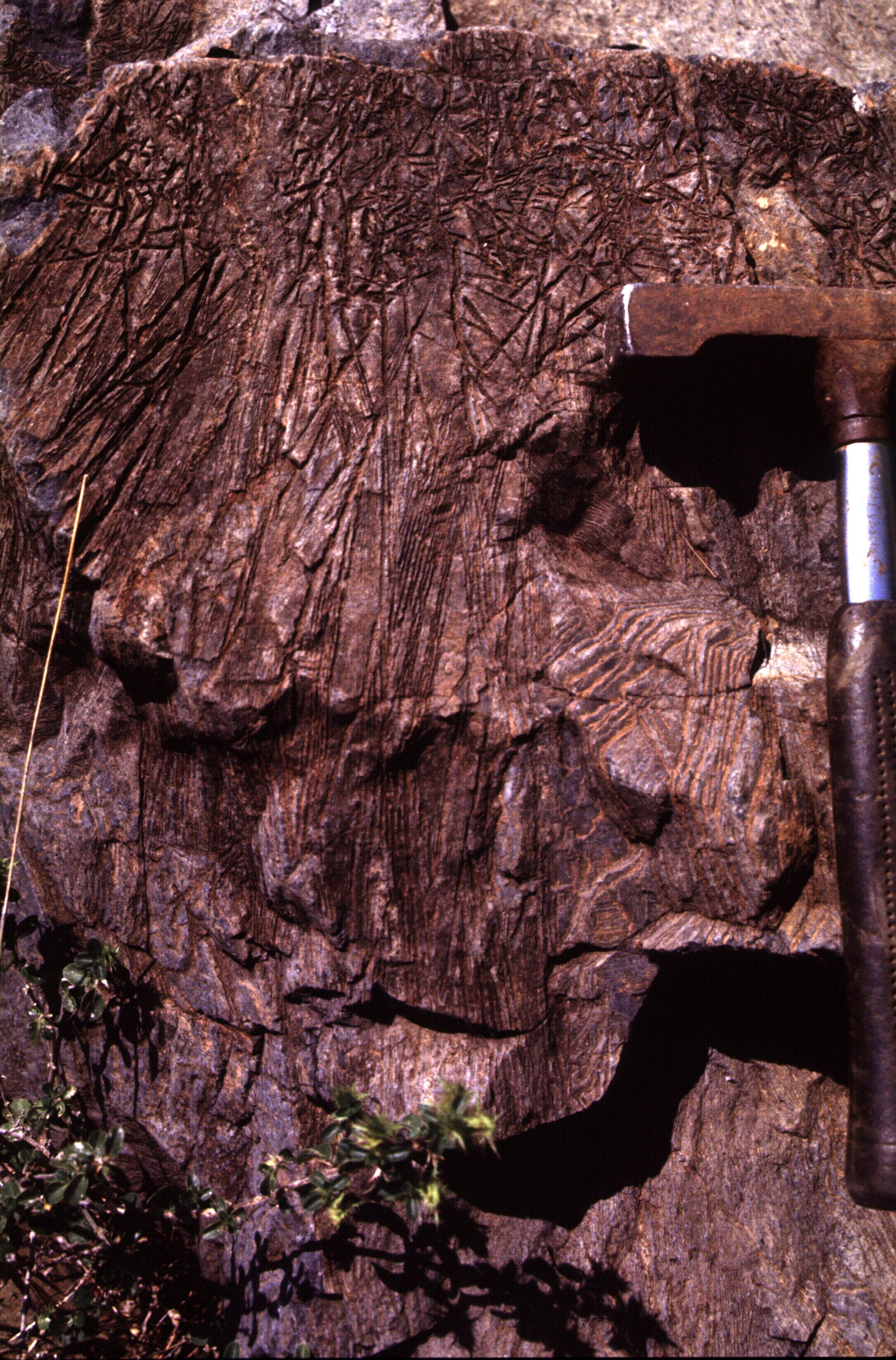
Komatiite lava at the type locality in the Komati Valley, Barberton Mountainland, South Africa, showing the distinctive "spinifex texture" formed by dendritic plates of olivine (scale shown by a hammer on the right edge of photo)

Komatiite /koʊˈmɑːtiˌaɪt/ is a type of ultramafic mantle-derived volcanic rock defined as having crystallised from a lava of at least 18 wt% magnesium oxide (MgO). It is classified as a 'picritic rock'. Komatiites have low silicon, potassium and aluminium, and high to extremely high magnesium content. Komatiite was named for its type locality along the Komati River in South Africa, and frequently displays spinifex texture composed of large dendritic plates of olivine and pyroxene.

Komatiites are rare rocks; almost all komatiites were formed during the Archaean Eon (4.03–2.5 billion years ago), with few younger (Proterozoic or Phanerozoic) examples known. This restriction in age is thought to be due to cooling of the mantle, which may have been 100–250 °C (212–482 °F) hotter during the Archaean. The early Earth had much higher heat production, due to the residual heat from planetary accretion, as well as the greater abundance of radioactive isotopes, particularly shorter lived ones like uranium 235 which produce more decay heat. Lower temperature mantle melts such as basalt and picrite have essentially replaced komatiites as an eruptive lava on the Earth's surface.

Geographically, komatiites are predominantly restricted in distribution to the Archaean shield areas, and occur with other ultramafic and high-magnesian mafic volcanic rocks in Archaean greenstone belts. The youngest komatiites are from the island of Gorgona on the Caribbean oceanic plateau off the Pacific coast of Colombia, and a rare example of Proterozoic komatiite is found in the Winnipegosis komatiite belt in Manitoba, Canada.

== Petrology ==
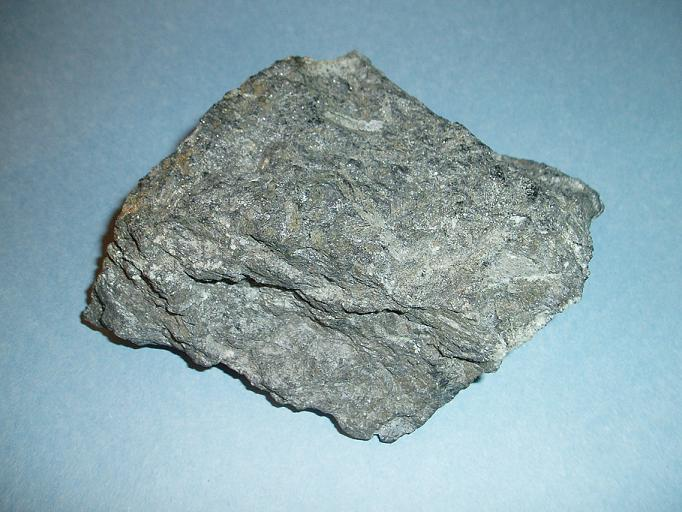
Komatiite sample collected from the Abitibi greenstone belt near Englehart, Ontario, Canada. Specimen is 9 cm wide. Bladed olivine crystals are visible, though spinifex texture is weak or absent in this sample.

Magmas of komatiitic compositions have a very high melting point, with calculated eruption temperatures up to, and possibly in excess of 1600 °C. Basaltic lavas normally have eruption temperatures of about 1100 to 1250 °C. The higher melting temperatures required to produce komatiite have been attributed to the presumed higher geothermal gradients in the Archaean Earth.

Komatiitic lava was extremely fluid when it erupted (possessing the viscosity close to that of water but with the density of rock). Compared to the basaltic lava of the Hawaiian plume basalts at ~1200 °C, which flows the way treacle or honey does, the komatiitic lava would have flowed swiftly across the surface, leaving extremely thin lava flows (down to 10 mm thick). The major komatiitic sequences preserved in Archaean rocks are thus considered to be lava tubes, ponds of lava etc., where the komatiitic lava accumulated.

Komatiite chemistry is different from that of basaltic and other common mantle-produced magmas, because of differences in degrees of partial melting. Komatiites are considered to have been formed by high degrees of partial melting, usually greater than 50%, and hence have high MgO with low K_{2}O and other incompatible elements.

There are two geochemical classes of komatiite; aluminium undepleted komatiite (AUDK) (also known as Group I komatiites) and aluminium depleted komatiite (ADK) (also known as Group II komatiites), defined by their Al_{2}O_{3}/TiO_{2} ratios. These two classes of komatiite are often assumed to represent a real petrological source difference between the two types related to depth of melt generation. Al-depleted komatiites have been modeled by melting experiments as being produced by high degrees of partial melting at high pressure where garnet in the source is not melted, whereas Al-undepleted komatiites are produced by high degrees of partial melts at lesser depth. However, recent studies of fluid inclusions in chrome spinels from the cumulate zones of komatiite flows have shown that a single komatiite flow can be derived from the mixing of parental magmas with a range of Al_{2}O_{3}/TiO_{2} ratios, calling into question this interpretation of the formations of the different komatiite groups. Komatiites probably form in extremely hot mantle plumes or in Archaean subduction zones.

Boninite magmatism is similar to komatiite magmatism but is produced by fluid-fluxed melting above a subduction zone. Boninites with 10–18% MgO tend to have higher large-ion lithophile elements (LILE: Ba, Rb, Sr) than komatiites.

== Mineralogy ==
Graph of komatiite geochemistry MgO% vs Cr ppm, from basal flows, Wannaway, Western Australia

The pristine volcanic mineralogy of komatiites is composed of forsteritic olivine (Fo90 and upwards), calcic and often chromian pyroxene, anorthite (An85 and upwards) and chromite.

A considerable population of komatiite examples show a cumulate texture and morphology. The usual cumulate mineralogy is highly magnesium rich forsterite olivine, though chromian pyroxene cumulates are also possible (though rarer).

Volcanic rocks rich in magnesium may be produced by accumulation of olivine phenocrysts in basalt melts of normal chemistry: an example is picrite. Part of the evidence that komatiites are not magnesium-rich simply because of cumulate olivine is textural: some contain spinifex texture, a texture attributable to rapid crystallization of the olivine in a thermal gradient in the upper part of a lava flow. "Spinifex" texture is named after the common name for the Australian grass Triodia, which grows in clumps with similar shapes.

Another line of evidence is that the MgO content of olivines formed in komatiites is toward the nearly pure MgO forsterite composition, which can only be achieved in bulk by crystallisation of olivine from a highly magnesian melt.

The rarely preserved flow top breccia and pillow margin zones in some komatiite flows are essentially volcanic glass, quenched in contact with overlying water or air. Because they are rapidly cooled, they represent the liquid composition of the komatiites, and thus record an anhydrous MgO content of up to 32% MgO. Some of the highest magnesian komatiites with clear textural preservation are those of the Barberton belt in South Africa, where liquids with up to 34% MgO can be inferred using bulk rock and olivine compositions.

The mineralogy of a komatiite varies systematically through the typical stratigraphic section of a komatiite flow and reflects magmatic processes which komatiites are susceptible to during their eruption and cooling. The typical mineralogical variation is from a flow base composed of olivine cumulate, to a spinifex textured zone composed of bladed olivine and ideally a pyroxene spinifex zone and olivine-rich chill zone on the upper eruptive rind of the flow unit.

Primary (magmatic) mineral species also encountered in komatiites include olivine, the pyroxenes augite, pigeonite and bronzite, plagioclase, chromite, ilmenite and rarely pargasitic amphibole. Secondary (metamorphic) minerals include serpentine, chlorite, amphibole, sodic plagioclase, quartz, iron oxides and rarely phlogopite, baddeleyite, and pyrope or hydrogrossular garnet.

== Metamorphism ==
All known komatiites have been metamorphosed, therefore should technically be termed 'metakomatiite' though the prefix meta is inevitably assumed. Many komatiites are highly altered and serpentinized or carbonated from metamorphism and metasomatism. This results in significant changes to the mineralogy and the texture.

=== Hydration vs. carbonation ===
The metamorphic mineralogy of ultramafic rocks, particularly komatiites, is only partially controlled by composition. The character of the connate fluids which are present during low temperature metamorphism whether prograde or retrograde control the metamorphic assemblage of a metakomatiite (hereafter the prefix meta- is assumed).

The factor controlling the mineral assemblage is the partial pressure of carbon dioxide within the metamorphic fluid, called the XCO_{2}. If XCO_{2} is above 0.5, the metamorphic reactions favor formation of talc, magnesite (magnesium carbonate), and tremolite amphibole. These are classed as talc-carbonation reactions. Below XCO_{2} of 0.5, metamorphic reactions in the presence of water favor production of serpentinite.

There are thus two main classes of metamorphic komatiite; carbonated and hydrated. Carbonated komatiites and peridotites form a series of rocks dominated by the minerals chlorite, talc, magnesite or dolomite and tremolite. Hydrated metamorphic rock assemblages are dominated by the minerals chlorite, serpentine-antigorite and brucite. Traces of talc, tremolite and dolomite may be present, as it is very rare that no carbon dioxide is present in metamorphic fluids. At higher metamorphic grades, anthophyllite, enstatite, olivine and diopside dominate as the rock mass dehydrates.

=== Mineralogic variations in komatiite flow facies ===
Komatiite tends to fractionate from high-magnesium compositions in the flow bases where olivine cumulates dominate, to lower magnesium compositions higher up in the flow. Thus, the current metamorphic mineralogy of a komatiite will reflect the chemistry, which in turn represents an inference as to its volcanological facies and stratigraphic position.

Typical metamorphic mineralogy is tremolite-chlorite, or talc-chlorite mineralogy in the upper spinifex zones. The more magnesian-rich olivine-rich flow base facies tend to be free from tremolite and chlorite mineralogy and are dominated by either serpentine-brucite +/- anthophyllite if hydrated, or talc-magnesite if carbonated. The upper flow facies tend to be dominated by talc, chlorite, tremolite, and other magnesian amphiboles (anthophyllite, cummingtonite, gedrite, etc.).

For example, the typical flow facies (see below) may have the following mineralogy;

Facies:	Hydrated	Carbonated
A1	Chlorite-tremolite	Talc-chlorite-tremolite
A2	Serpentine-tremolite-chlorite	Talc-tremolite-chlorite
A3	Serpentine-chlorite	Talc-magnesite-tremolite-chlorite
B1	Serpentine-chlorite-anthophyllite	Talc-magnesite
B2	Massive serpentine-brucite	Massive talc-magnesite
B3	Serpentine-brucite-chlorite	Talc-magnesite-tremolite-chlorite

== Geochemistry ==
Komatiite can be classified according to the following IUGS geochemical criteria:

- SiO_{2} less than 52 wt%
- MgO more than 18 wt%
- K_{2}O + Na_{2}O less than 1 wt%
- TiO_{2} less than 1 wt%

When meeting the above, but the TiO_{2} is more than 1 wt%, it is classified as meimechite.

A similar high-Mg volcanic rock is boninite, having 52–63 wt% SiO_{2}, more than 8 wt% MgO and less than 0.5 wt% TiO_{2}.

The above geochemical classification must be the essentially unaltered magma chemistry and not the result of crystal accumulation (as in peridotite). Through a typical komatiite flow sequence the chemistry of the rock will change according to the internal fractionation which occurs during eruption. This tends to lower MgO, Cr, Ni, and increase Al, K_{2}O, Na, CaO and SiO_{2} toward the top of the flow.

Rocks rich in MgO, K_{2}O, Ba, Cs, and Rb may be lamprophyres, kimberlites or other rare ultramafic, potassic or ultrapotassic rocks.

== Morphology and occurrence ==
Komatiites often show pillow lava structure, autobrecciated upper margins consistent with underwater eruption forming a rigid upper skin to the lava flows. Proximal volcanic facies are thinner and interleaved with sulfidic sediments, black shales, cherts and tholeiitic basalts. Komatiites were produced from a relatively wet mantle. Evidence of this is from their association with felsics, occurrences of komatiitic tuffs, niobium anomalies and by S- and H_{2}O-borne rich mineralizations.

=== Textural features ===
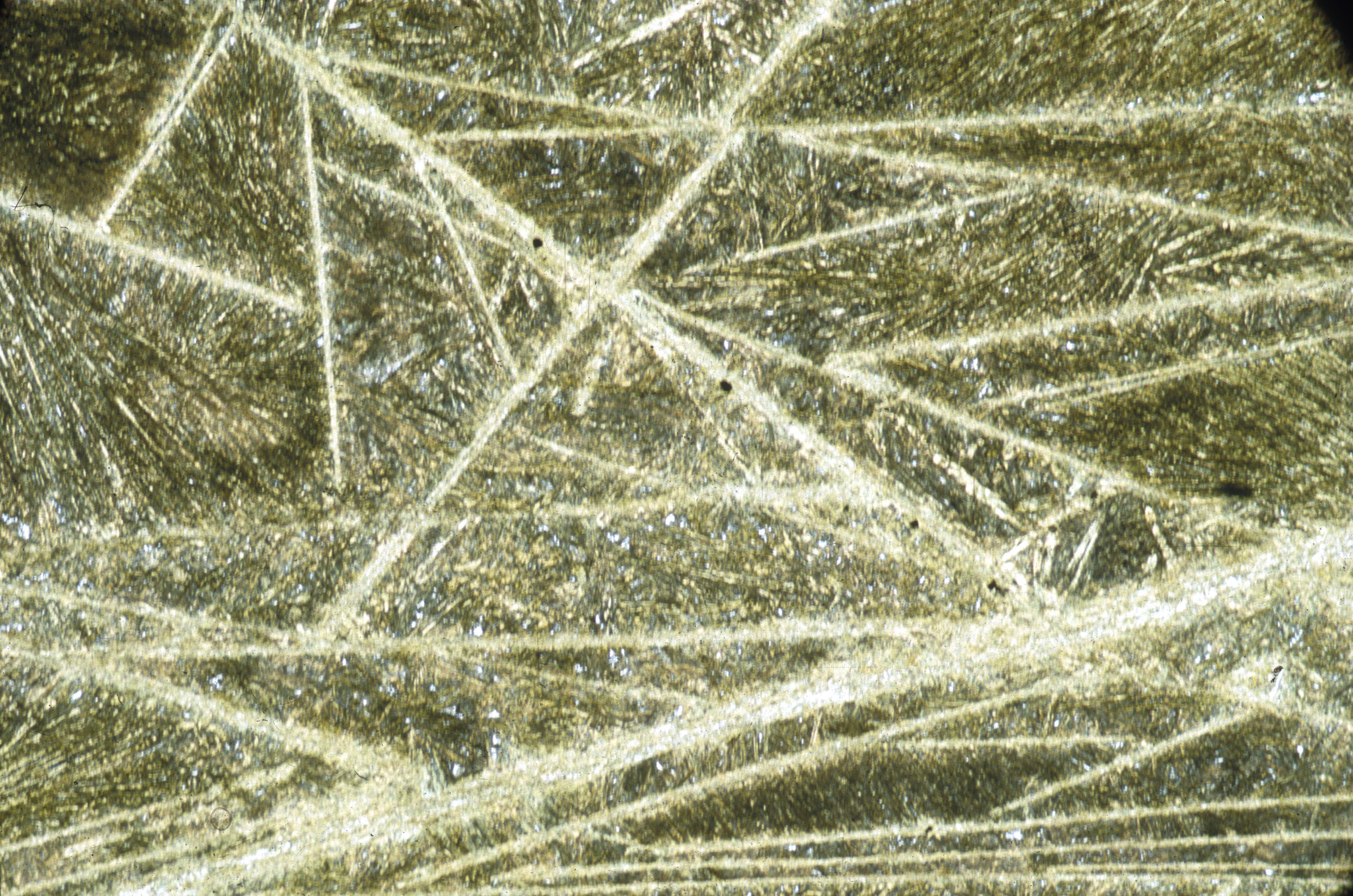
Photomicrograph of a thin section of komatiite showing spinifex texture of pyroxene needle-like crystals

A common and distinctive texture is known as spinifex texture and consists of long acicular phenocrysts of olivine (or pseudomorphs of alteration minerals after olivine) or pyroxene which give the rock a bladed appearance especially on a weathered surface. Spinifex texture is the result of rapid crystallization of highly magnesian liquid in the thermal gradient at the margin of the flow or sill.

Harrisite texture, first described from intrusive rocks (not komatiites) at Harris Bay on the island of Rùm in Scotland, is formed by nucleation of crystals on the floor of a magma chamber. Harrisites are known to form megacrystal aggregates of pyroxene and olivine up to 1 metre in length. Harrisite texture is found in some very thick lava flows of komatiite, for example in the Norseman-Wiluna Greenstone Belt of Western Australia, in which crystallization of cumulates has occurred.

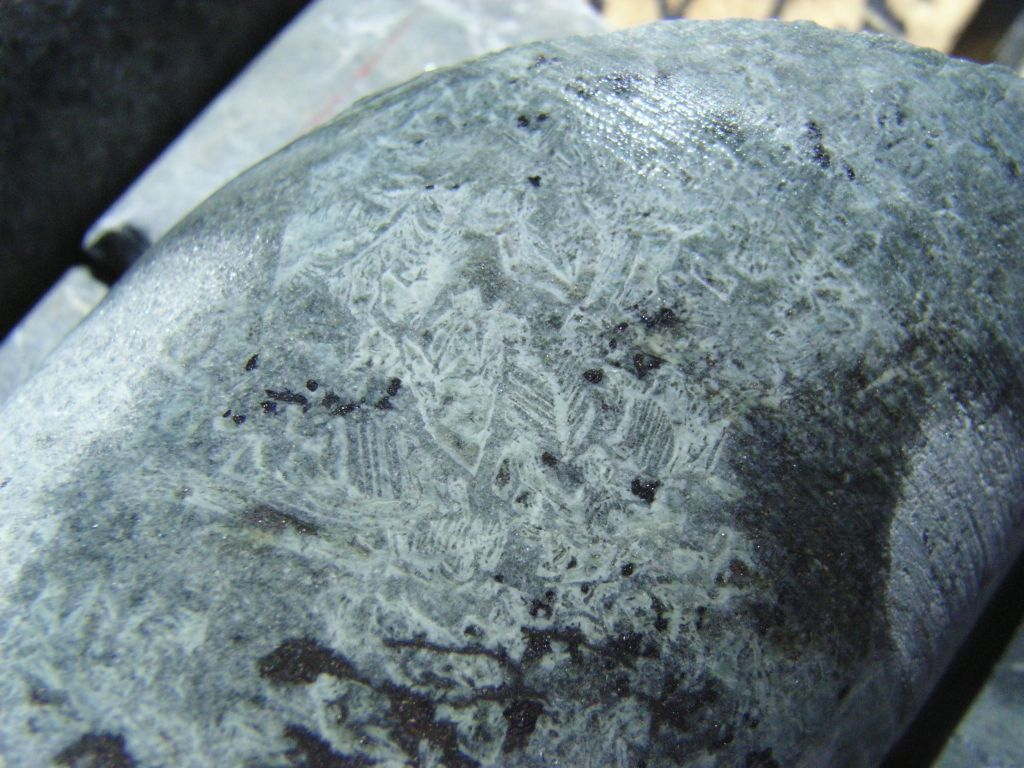
A2 facies dendritic feathery olivine crystals, drill hole WDD18, Widgiemooltha, Western Australia

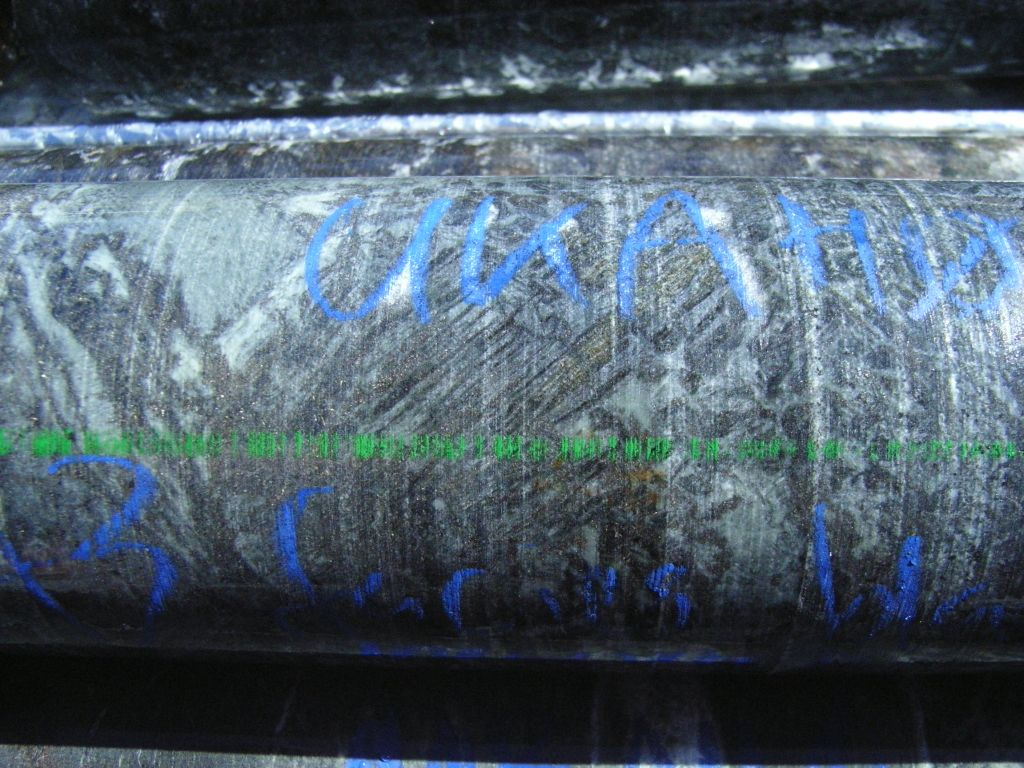
A3 facies bladed olivine spinifex, drill hole WDD18, Widgiemooltha Komatiite, Western Australia

=== Volcanology ===
Komatiite volcano morphology is interpreted to have the general form and structure of a shield volcano, typical of most large basalt edifices, as the magmatic event which forms komatiites erupts less magnesian materials.

However, the initial flux of the most magnesian magmas is interpreted to form a channelised flow facie, which is envisioned as a fissure vent releasing highly fluid komatiitic lava onto the surface. This then flows outwards from the vent fissure, concentrating into topographical lows, and forming channel environments composed of high MgO olivine adcumulate flanked by a 'sheeted flow facies' aprons of lower MgO olivine and pyroxene thin-flow spinifex sheets.

The typical komatiite lava flow has six stratigraphically related elements;

- A1 – pillowed and variolitic chilled flow top, often grading and transitional with sediment
- A2 – Zone of quickly chilled, feathery acicular olivine-clinopyroxene-glass representing a chilled margin on the top of the flow unit
- A3 – Olivine spinifex sequence composed of sheaf and book-like olivine spinifex, representing a downward-growing crystal accumulation on the flow top
- B1 – Olivine mesocumulate to orthocumulate, representing a harrisite grown in flowing liquid melt
- B2 – Olivine adcumulate composed of >93% interlocking equant olivine crystals
- B3 – Lower chill margin composed of olivine adcumulate to mesocumulate, with finer grain size.

Individual flow units may not be entirely preserved, as subsequent flow units may thermally erode the A zone spinifex flows. In the distal thin flow facies, B zones are poorly developed to absent, as not enough through-flowing liquid existed to grow the adcumulate.

The channel and sheeted flows are then covered by high-magnesian basalts and tholeiitic basalts as the volcanic event evolves to less magnesian compositions. The subsequent magmatism, being higher silica melts, tends to form a more typical shield volcano architecture.

=== Intrusive komatiites ===
Komatiite magma is extremely dense and unlikely to reach the surface, being more likely to pool lower within the crust. Modern (post-2004) interpretations of some of the larger olivine adcumulate bodies in the Yilgarn craton have revealed that the majority of komatiite olivine adcumulate occurrences are likely to be subvolcanic to intrusive in nature.

This is recognised at the Mt Keith nickel deposit where wall-rock intrusive textures and xenoliths of felsic country rocks have been recognised within the low-strain contacts. The previous interpretations of these large komatiite bodies was that they were "super channels" or reactivated channels, which grew to over 500 m in stratigraphic thickness during prolonged volcanism.

These intrusions are considered to be channelised sills, formed by injection of komatiitic magma into the stratigraphy, and inflation of the magma chamber. Economic nickel-mineralised olivine adcumulate bodies may represent a form of sill-like conduit, where magma pools in a staging chamber before erupting onto the surface.

== Economic importance ==
The economic importance of komatiite was first widely recognised in the early 1960s with the discovery of massive nickel sulfide mineralisation at Kambalda, Western Australia. Komatiite-hosted nickel-copper sulfide mineralisation today accounts for about 14% of the world's nickel production, mostly from Australia, Canada and South Africa.

Komatiites are associated with nickel and gold deposits in Australia, Canada, South Africa and most recently in the Guiana shield of South America.

== See also ==
- List of rock textures – List of rock textural and morphological terms
- List of rock types
- Igneous rock – Rock formed through the cooling and solidification of magma or lava
- Rock microstructure – Relationship between materials which compose a rock
- Komatiitic Ni-Cu-PGE mineralisation – Fe-Ni-Cu-PGE ore deposit
- Ultramafic rock – Type of igneous and meta-igneous rock
- Cumulate rock – Igneous rock formed by accumulating crystals from a magma

== Bibliography ==
- Hess, P. C. (1989), Origins of Igneous Rocks, President and Fellows of Harvard College (pp. 276–285), ISBN 0-674-64481-6.
- Hill R.E.T, Barnes S.J., Gole M.J. and Dowling S.E. (1990), Physical volcanology of komatiites; A field guide to the komatiites of the Norseman-Wiluna Greenstone Belt, Eastern Goldfields Province, Yilgarn Block, Western Australia., Geological Society of Australia. ISBN 0-909869-55-3
- Blatt, Harvey and Robert Tracy (1996), Petrology, 2nd ed., Freeman (pp. 196–7), ISBN 0-7167-2438-3.
- S. A. Svetov, A. I. Svetova, and H. Huhma, 1999, Geochemistry of the Komatiite–Tholeiite Rock Association in the Vedlozero–Segozero Archean Greenstone Belt, Central Karelia, Geochemistry International, Vol. 39, Suppl. 1, 2001, pp. S24–S38. PDF accessed 7-25-2005
- Vernon R.H., 2004, A Practical Guide to Rock Microstructure, (pp. 43–69, 150–152) Cambridge University Press. ISBN 0-521-81443-X
- Arndt, N.T., and Nisbet, E.G. (1982), Komatiites. Unwin Hyman, ISBN 0-04-552019-4. Hardcover.
- Arndt, N.T., and Lesher, C.M. (2005), Komatiites, in Selley, RC, Cocks, L.R.M., Plimer, I.R. (Editors), Encyclopedia of Geology 3, Elsevier, New York, pp. 260–267
- Faure, F., Arndt, N.T. Libourel, G. (2006), Formation of spinifex texture in komatiite: An experimental study. J. Petrol 47, 1591–1610.
- Arndt, N.T., Lesher, C.M. and Barnes, S.J. (2008), Komatiite, Cambridge University Press, Cambridge, 488 pp., ISBN 978-0521874748.
