= Honeymoon Well nickel project =

Australian mining project

Honeymoon Well
- Location within Western Australia
- Interactive map of Honeymoon Well
- Location: 33km south of Wiluna, Western Australia, Australia; 26°54′23″S 120°22′41″E
- Products: Nickel
- Opened: In development
- Company: BHP
- Acquired: 2020

The Honeymoon Well nickel project is a proposed mining project in the west of Australia in the state of Western Australia. Honeymoon Well represents one of the largest nickel resources in Australia with estimated measured and indicated mineral resources of 173 million tonnes of ore grading 0.67% nickel, for 1.17 million tonnes of contained nickel.

The Honeymoon Well project comprises Wedgetail, Hannibals, Harrier, Corella and Harakka Fields with prospective areas at Albion Downs North and South. Most of these deposits are disseminated nickel sulphide, but Wedgetail contains massive and vein sulphide mineralization. At 2019 the project was at a mine scoping and design stage. In 2012, it had been expected to be producing by 2017.

In June 2020 Norilsk Nickel sold the Honeymoon Well project, and the Albion Downs North and Jericho joint ventures to BHP.
