= Talc carbonate =

Talc carbonates are a suite of rock and mineral compositions found in metamorphosed ultramafic rocks.

The term refers to the two most common end-member minerals found within ultramafic rocks which have undergone talc-carbonation or carbonation reactions: talc and the carbonate mineral magnesite.

Talc carbonate mineral assemblages are controlled by temperature and pressure of metamorphism and the partial pressure of carbon dioxide within metamorphic fluids, as well as by the composition of the host rock.

== Compositional controls ==
In a general sense, talc carbonate metamorphic assemblages are diagnostic of the magnesium content of the ultramafic protolith.

- Lower-magnesian ultramafic rocks (12-18% MgO as a rule of thumb) tend to favor talc-chlorite assemblages
- Medium-MgO rocks (15-25% MgO) tend to produce talc-amphibole assemblages.
- High-MgO rocks with in excess of 25% MgO tend to form true talc-magnesite metamorphic assemblages.

Thus, the MgO content of a metamorphosed ultramafic rock can be estimated by understanding the mineral assemblage of the rock. Magnesium content determines the proportion of talc and/or magnesite and aluminium-calcium-sodium content determines the proportion of amphibole and/or chlorite.

== Talc carbonate minerals ==
Several minerals are diagnostic of talc carbonated ultramafic rocks;

- Talc
- Chlorite, generally magnesian bluish-green
- Tremolite-cummingtonite-grunerite amphiboles in greenschist facies rocks
- Anthophyllite-cummingtonite amphibole in weakly carbonated serpentinite at greenschist facies or very rarely, uncarbonated amphibolite facies serpentinites
- Magnesite, and rarely dolomite in association with amphibolitic compositions

At amphibolite facies, the diopside-in isograd is reached (dependent on carbon dioxide partial pressure) and metamorphic assemblages trend toward talc-pyroxene and eventually toward metamorphic olivine.

=== Mineral reactions ===
Serpentinisation of olivine:

+ 3H_{2}O → +

Or by addition of aqueous silica:

3Mg_{2}SiO_{4} + 4H_{2}O + SiO_{2,aq} → 2Mg_{3}Si_{2}O_{5}(OH)_{4}

Carbonation of serpentine to form talc-magnesite

2Mg_{3}Si_{2}O_{5}(OH)_{4} + 3CO_{2} → Mg_{3}Si_{4}O_{10}(OH)_{2} + 3MgCO_{3} + 3H_{2}O

== Occurrence ==
Because carbon dioxide is such a common component of metamorphic fluids, talc-carbonated ultramafics are relatively common. However, the degree of talc-carbonation is usually somewhere between the two end-member compositions of pure serpentinite and pure talc-carbonate. It is common to see serpentinites which contain talc, amphibole and chloritic minerals in small proportions which infer the presence of carbon dioxide in the metamorphic fluid.

Talc carbonate is present in many of the ultramafic bodies of the Archaean Yilgarn craton, Western Australia. Notably, the Widgiemooltha Komatiite shows pure talc-carbonation on the eastern flank of the Widgeimooltha Dome, and almost pure serpentinite metamorphism on the western flank.

== Carbonation of other rocks ==
Carbon dioxide has less severe impacts on mafic, felsic and rocks of other composition, such as carbonate rocks, chemical sediments, etcetera. The exception to this rule is the calc-silicate family of metamorphic rocks, which are also subjected to wide variations in mineral speciation due to the mobility of carbonate during metamorphism.

Felsic and mafic rocks tend to be less affected by carbon dioxide due to their higher aluminium content. Ultramafic rocks lack aluminium, which allows carbonate to react with magnesium silicates to form talc. In rocks with extremely low aluminium contents, this reaction can progress to create magnesite.

Advanced carbonation of felsic and mafic rocks, very rarely, creates fenite, a metasomatic alteration caused particularly by carbonatite intrusions. Fenite alteration is known, but very restricted in distribution, around high-temperature metamorphic talc-carbonates, generally in the form of a sort of aureole around ultramafics. Such examples include biotite-rich zones, amphibolite-calcite-scapolite alteration and other unusual skarn assemblages.

== See also ==
- Amphibolite
- Granulite
- Greenschist
- Komatiite
- List of rock types
- Listwanite
- Metamorphic rock
- Serpentinite
- Soapstone
- Ultramafic rocks
