= Lake Johnston (Western Australia) =

Lake in Western Australia

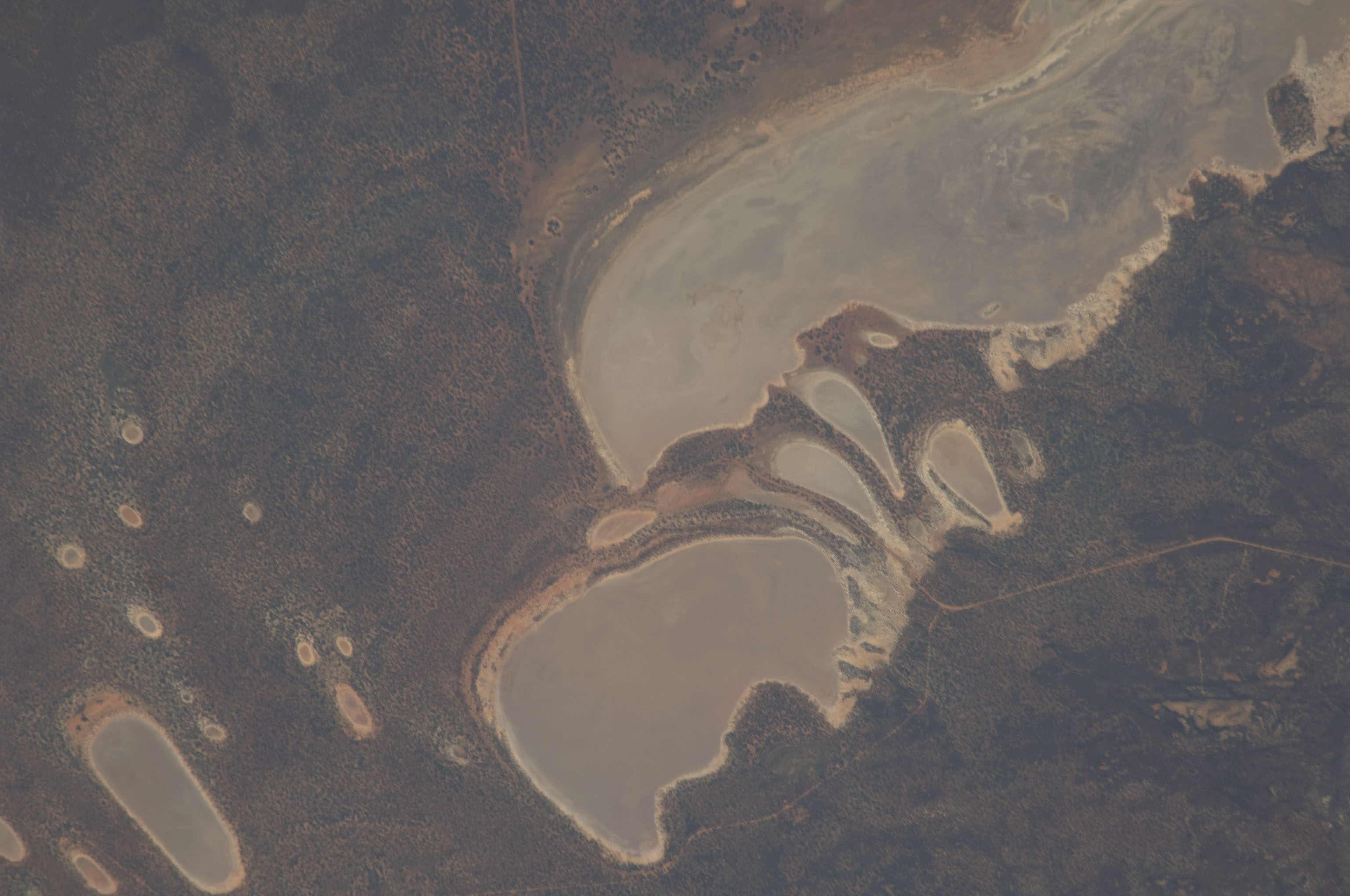
- Satellite image of Lake Johnston taken by ISS Expedition 18

- Location in Western Australia
- Interactive map of Lake Johnston
- Location: Goldfields-Esperance, Western Australia
- Coordinates: 31°52′00″S 121°20′00″E
- Basin countries: Australia

Lake Johnston is a lake in the Goldfields-Esperance region of the state of Western Australia.

It lies to the east of Hyden and west of Norseman. It is also the name of the geological map of the area.

It and adjacent lakes have been referred to collectively as The Johnston Lakes.

== Lake ==
It lies to the south of the Hyden-Norseman road, in the Shire of Dundas, and has a significant collection of named rocks near its shores:

Western side:

- Scamp Rock
- Knapp Rock
- Plover Rock

Eastern side:

- Harbutt Rock
- Thiel Rock

At the southern end of the lake the Bremer Range is at the boundary of the Dundas and Esperance shires.

== Maps ==
The maps for the area near Lake Johnston use the name of the lake for the key term. More recent maps are also available as datasets from Geoscience Australia.

== Vegetation area ==
Lake Johnston area is also linked to the Boorabbin and Hyden areas in vegetation surveys and maps.

== Geology ==
It is in an area of high interest to geologists and mine exploration companies, and adjacent to nickel deposits.

== Nickel mines ==
The Lake Johnston Nickel Project is currently inactive.

A lake of similar size, Lake Hope, lies to the south west of Lake Johnston. The Emily Ann and Maggie Hays nickel mines lie to the north west of Lake Hope, west of Lake Johnston. The Emily Ann mine lies on the north side of the Hyden-Norseman road, while the Maggie Hays mine lies on the south side of the road. Due west less than 160 kilometres (100 mi), the Flying Fox, Lounge Lizard and Spotted Qoull nickel mines are located.
