= The Joy of Science =

Popular video lectures by Robert Hazen

DVD cover for "The Joy of Science" lecture series.

The Joy of Science is a popular video and audio course series, consisting of 60 lectures, each 30 minutes long, presented by Robert Hazen of the George Mason University and the Carnegie Institution of Washington. The course, first introduced in 2001, is part of The Great Courses series, and is produced and distributed by The Teaching Company, located in Chantilly, Virginia, in the United States.

== Background ==
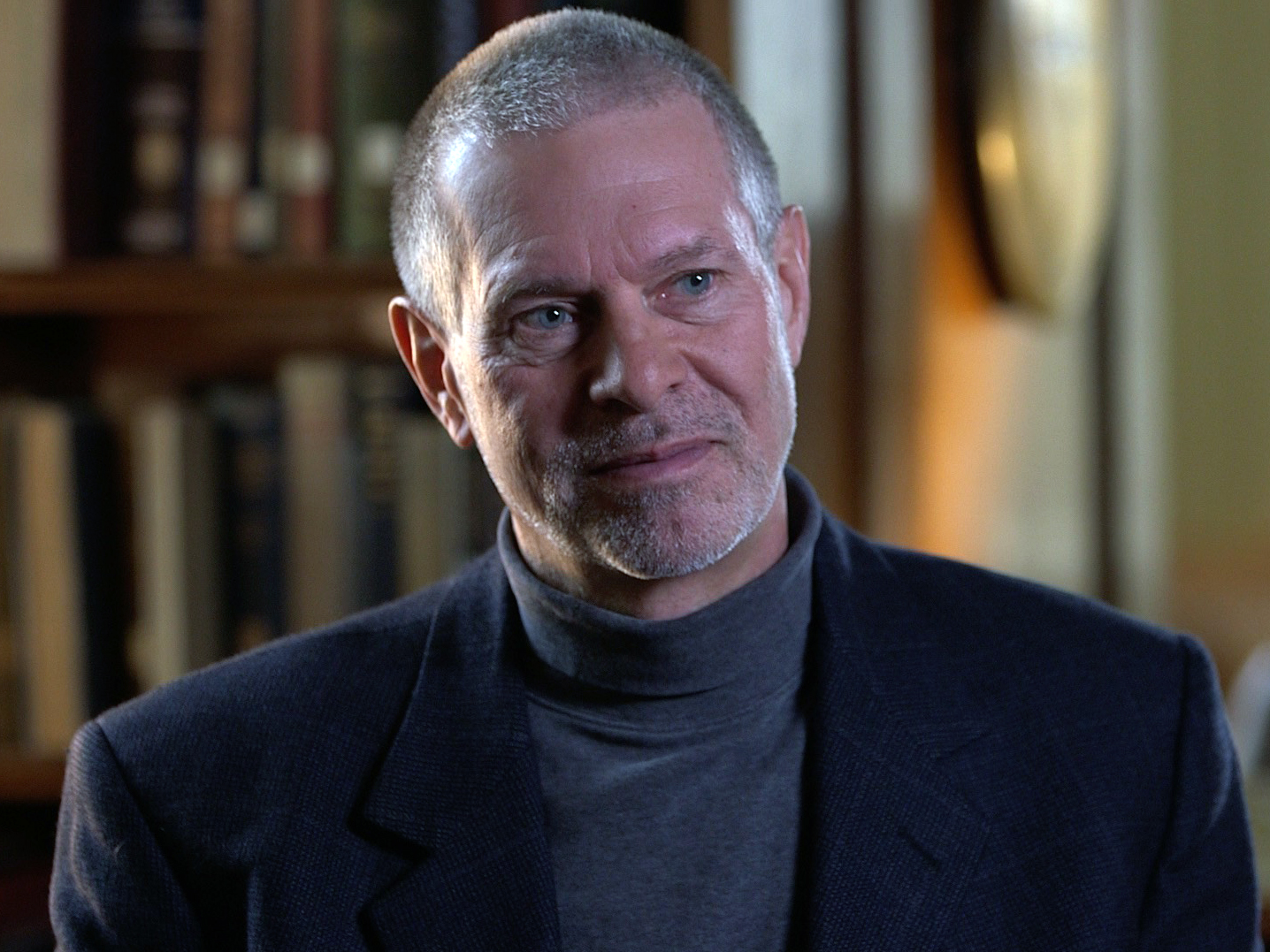
Dr. Robert Hazen

As the Clarence B. Robinson Professor at George Mason University, Robert Hazen developed innovative courses to promote scientific literacy in both scientists and non-scientists. In a collaboration with physicist James Trefil, he wrote three undergraduate textbooks: The Sciences: An Integrated Approach (1993), The Physical Sciences: An Integrated Approach (1995), and Physics Matters: An Introduction to Conceptual Physics (2004). Hazen used these as the basis for a 60-lecture video and audio course called The Joy of Science.

== Description ==
No.	Title	No.	Title	No.	Title
01	The Nature of Science	21	Introduction to Chemistry	41	The Atmospheric Cycle
02	The Scientific Method	22	The Chemistry of Carbon	42	The Rock Cycle
03	The Ordered Universe	23	States of Matter and Changes of State	43	What Is Life?
04	Celestrial and Terrestrial Mechanics	24	Phase Transformations and Chemical Reactions	44	Strategies of Life
05	Newton's Laws of Motion	25	Properties of Materials	45	Life's Molecular Building Blocks
06	Universal Gravitation	26	Semiconductors and Modern Microelectronics	46	Proteins
07	The Nature of Energy	27	Isotopes and Radioactivity	47	Cells–The Chemical Factories of Life
08	The First Law of Thermodynamics	28	Nuclear Fission and Fusion Reactions	48	Gregor Mendel, Founder of Genetics
09	The Second Law of Thermodynamics	29	Astronomy	49	The Discovery of DNA
10	Entropy	30	The Life Cycle of Stars	50	The Genetic Code
11	Magnetism and Static Electricity	31	Edwin Hubble and the Discovery of Galaxies	51	Reading the Genetic Code
12	Electricity	32	The Big Bang	52	Genetic Engineering
13	Electromagnetism	33	The Ultimate Structure of Matter	53	Cancer and Other Genetic Diseases
14	The Electromagnetic Spectrum, Part I	34	The Nebular Hypothesis	54	The Chemical Evolution of Life
15	The Electromagnetic Spectrum, Part II	35	The Solar System	55	Biological Evolution – A Unifying Theme of Biology
16	Relativity	36	The Earth as a Planet	56	The Fact of Evolution – The Fossil Record
17	Atoms	37	The Dynamic Earth	57	Charles Darwin and the Theory of Natural Selection
18	The Bohr Atom	38	The Plate Tectonics Revolution	58	Ecosystems and the Law of Unintended Consequences
19	The Quantum World	39	Earthquakes, Volcanoes, and Plate Motions Today	59	The Ozone Hole, Acid Rain, and the Greenhouse Effect
20	The Periodic Table of Elements	40	Earth Cycles–Water	60	Science, the Endless Frontier

== See also ==
- Abiogenesis
- Continental drift
- Cosmology
- Earth science
- Evolution
- The World We Live In (Life magazine)
