= Robert Hazen =

Research scientist at George Mason University

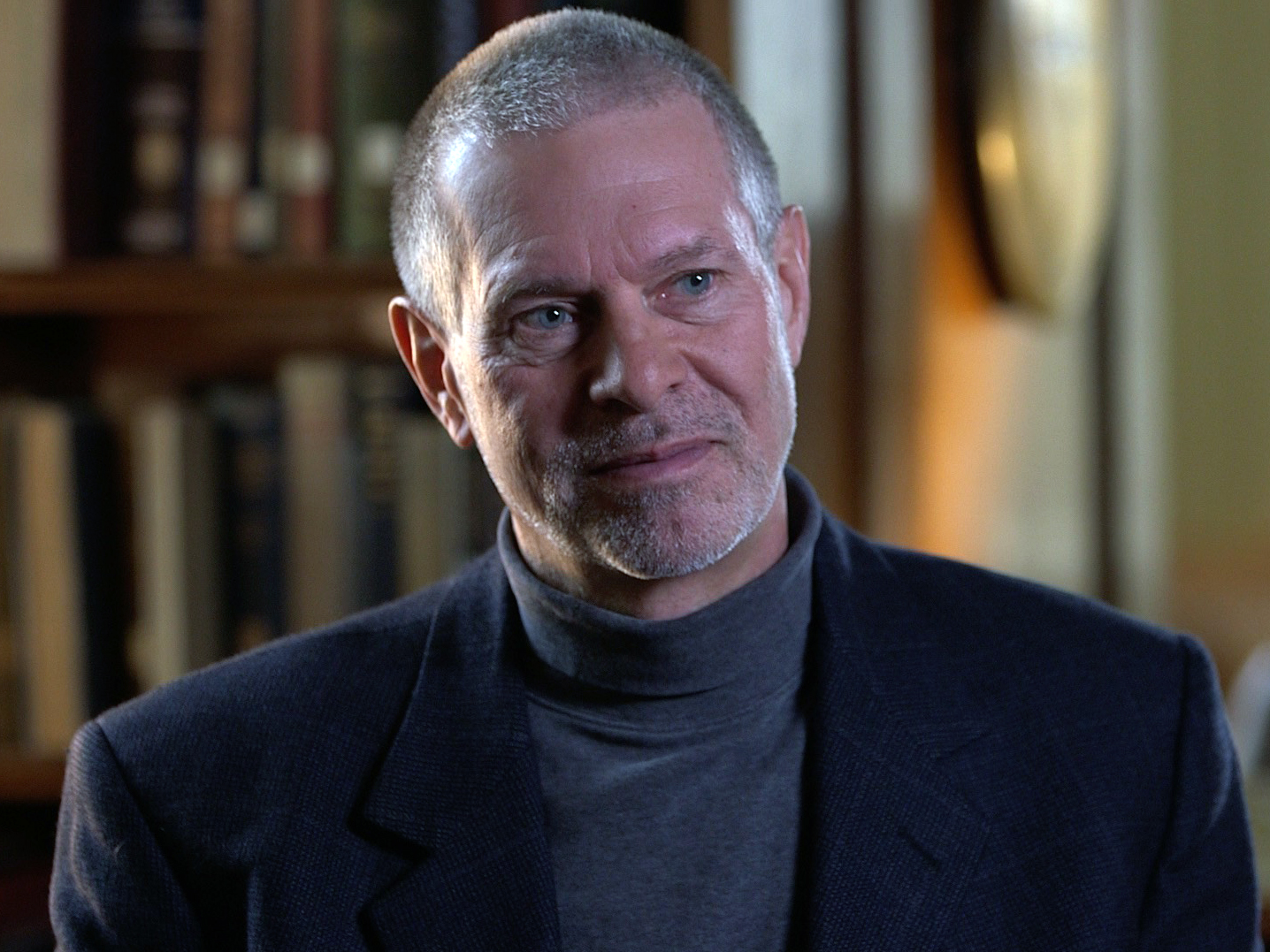
- c. 2015
- Born: Robert Miller Hazen; November 1, 1948 (age 78); Rockville Centre, New York, US
- Education: B.S. Earth Science, MIT, 1970; S.M. Earth Science, MIT, 1971; Ph.D. Mineralogy and Crystallography, Harvard, 1975
- Spouse: Margaret Joan Hindle (m. 1969)
- Children: 2
- Awards: Roebling Medal
- Scientific career
- Fields: Mineralogy, Astrobiology
- Workplaces: Carnegie Institution for Science, George Mason University, Deep Carbon Observatory
- Thesis: Effects of temperature and pressure on the crystal physics of olivine (1975)
- Doctoral advisor: Charles Burnham
- Other academic advisors: David Wones
- Website: carnegiescience.edu/bio/dr-robert-hazen

Robert Miller Hazen (born November 1, 1948) is an American mineralogist and astrobiologist. He is a research scientist at Carnegie Institution for Science's Earth and Planets Laboratory and Clarence Robinson Professor of Earth Sciences Emeritus at George Mason University, in the United States. Hazen launched the Deep Carbon Observatory in 2009 and served as its Executive Director until 2019.

== Early life ==
Hazen was born in Rockville Centre, New York, on November 1, 1948. His parents were Peggy Hazen (née Dorothy Ellen Chapin; 1918–2002) and Dan Hazen (né Daniel Francis Hazen, Jr.; 1918–2016). He spent his early childhood in Cleveland, near a fossil quarry where he collected his first trilobite at the age of about 9.

The Hazen family moved to New Jersey, where Robert's eight-grade teacher, Bill Welsh, observed Robert's interest in his collection of minerals. Hazen later recalled "He gave me a starter collection of 100 specimens, mineral field guides, and mimeographed directions to Paterson and Franklin, New Jersey." Hazen also had an early interest in music, starting with the piano at age 5, the violin at 6 and the trumpet at age 9.

== Education ==
Hazen worked on his B.S. and S.M. (Master of Science) in Earth Science at the Massachusetts Institute of Technology 1971. He started with the intention of going into chemical engineering, but he was captivated by the enthusiasm of David Wones and converted to mineralogy. With Wones as advisor, he completed a masters thesis on cation substitution in trioctahedral micas; his publication in American Mineralogist was his first to be highly cited. He completed a Ph.D. in Mineralogy & Crystallography at Harvard University in 1975. His thesis, with Charles Burnham as advisor, involved learning how to use a 4-circle diffractometer to do high-pressure X-ray crystallography and applying it to olivine. This became a focus of his early career.

While a NATO Postdoctoral Fellow at Cambridge University in England, Hazen worked with Charles Prewitt to determine empirical relations for the effect of temperature and pressure on interatomic distances in oxides and silicates.

== Geophysical Laboratory ==
In 1976, Hazen joined the Carnegie Institution's Geophysical Laboratory as a research associate. After a brief stint measuring optical properties of lunar minerals with Peter Bell and David Mao, he started to do X-ray crystallography with Larry Finger. He later recalled, "It was a match made in mineralogical heaven: Larry loved to write code, build machines, and analyze data; I loved to mount crystals, run the diffractometers, and write papers." They collaborated for two decades and determined about a thousand crystal structures at variable pressures and temperatures, work summarized in their 1982 book Comparative Crystal Chemistry.

Much of the work that Hazen was doing could be classified as mineral physics, a cross between geophysics and mineralogy. Although the field had pioneering contributions from the Nobel Prize winner Percy Bridgman and a student of his, Francis Birch, in the early- to mid-20th century, it did not have a name until the 1960s, and in the 1970s some scientists were concerned that a more interdisciplinary approach was needed to understand the relationship between interatomic forces and mineral properties. Hazen and Prewitt co-convened the first mineral physics conference; it was held on October 17–19, 1977 at the Airlie House in Warrenton, Virginia.

=== High-temperature superconductors ===
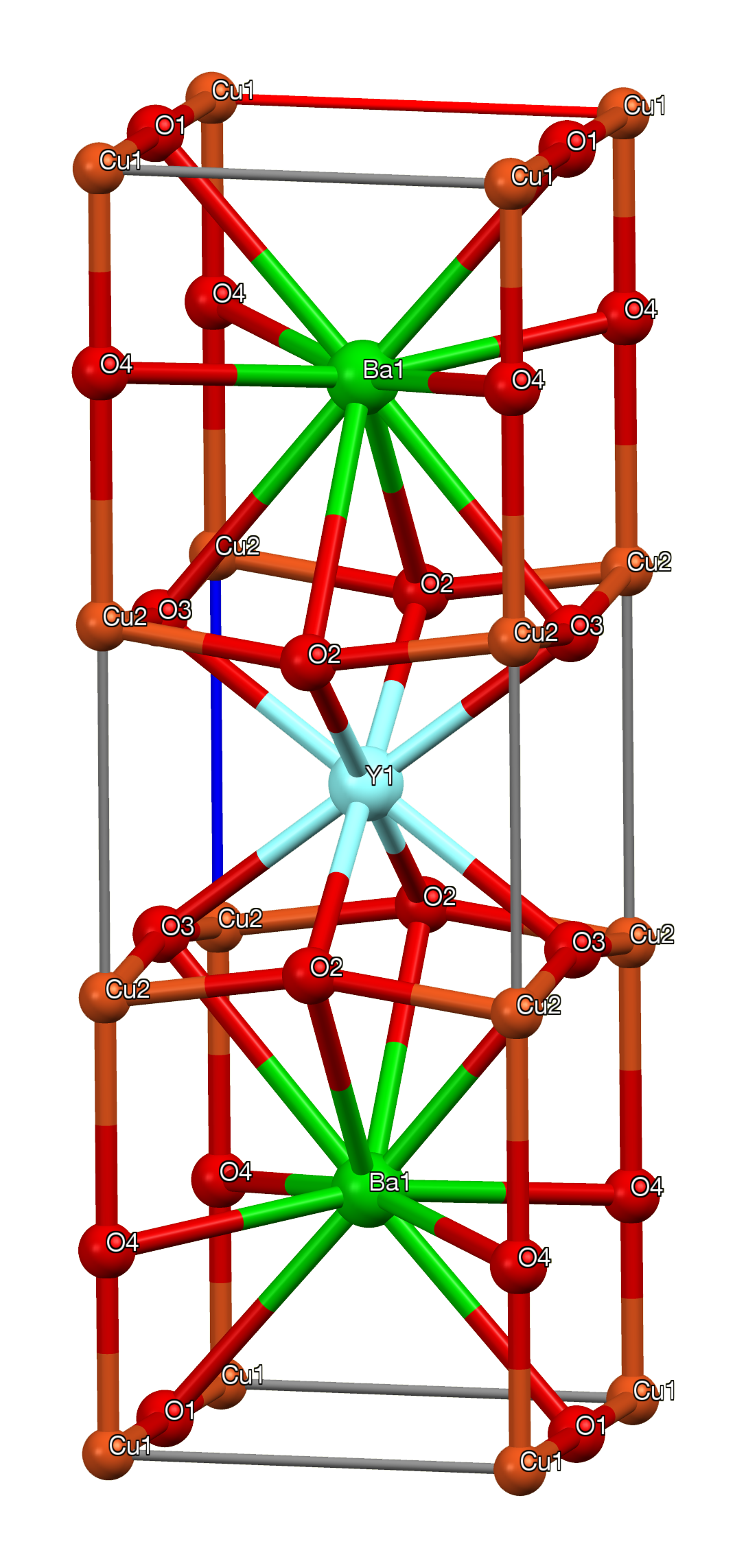
A model of a YBa_{2}Cu_{3}O_{7} unit cell.

Cooled to very low temperatures, some materials experience a sudden transition where electrical resistance drops to zero and any magnetic fields are expelled. This phenomenon is called superconductivity. Superconductors have a host of applications including powerful electromagnets, fast digital circuits and sensitive magnetometers, but the very low temperatures needed make the applications more difficult and expensive. Until the 1980s, no superconductors existed above 21 K (−252.2 °C). Then in 1986 two IBM researchers, Georg Bednorz and K. Alex Müller, found a ceramic material with a critical temperature of 35 K (−238.2 °C). This set off a frenzied search for higher critical temperatures.

A group led by Paul Chu at the University of Houston explored some materials made of yttrium, barium, copper and oxygen (YCBO) and were the first to obtain a critical temperature above the boiling point of liquid nitrogen. The YCBO samples had a mixture of black and green minerals, and although the researchers knew the average composition, they did not know the compositions of the two phases. In February 1987, Chu turned to Mao and Hazen, because they could determine the composition of small mineral grains in rocks. It took Hazen and Finger a week to determine the compositions; the black phase, which turned out to be the superconductor, was YBa_{2}Cu_{3}O_{7−δ}.

Hazen, Finger, and colleagues determined that the crystal structure of the superconducting phase was like that of perovskite, an important mineral in Earth's mantle. Subsequently, Hazen's group identified twelve more high-temperature oxide superconductors, all with perovskite structures, and worked on organic superconductors.

== Origins of life ==
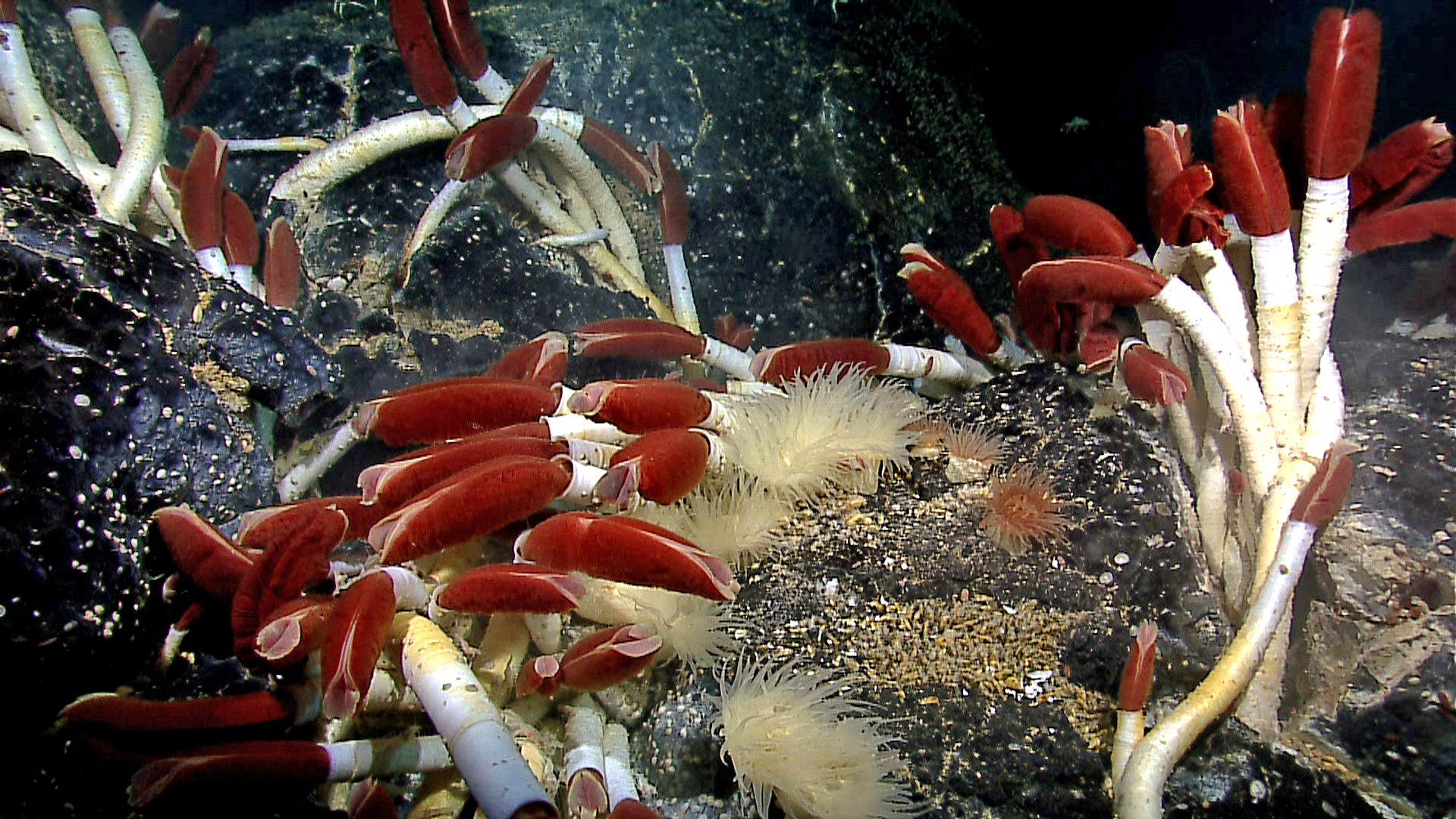
Hydrothermal vents support a great variety of organisms, such as these giant tube worms near the Galápagos hotspot, and may have been where life originated.

By the mid-1990s, Hazen felt that his research had reached a "respectable plateau" where the main principles of how crystals compress were known. The questions he was asking were increasingly narrow and the answers rarely surprising. So he changed research directions to study life's chemical origins. This opportunity came when a colleague at George Mason University, Harold Morowitz, realized that the temperature and pressure at a hydrothermal vent might change the properties of water, allowing chemical reactions that ordinarily require the help of an enzyme. Enlisting the help of Hatten Yoder, a specialist in high pressure mineralogy, they tried subjecting pyruvate in water to high pressure, hoping for a simple reaction that would return oxaloacetate. Instead, an analysis by an organic geochemist, George Cody, found that they obtained tens of thousands of molecules.

The publication of their results, which seemed to support the deep sea vent hypothesis, met with criticism, especially from Stanley Miller and colleagues who believe that life emerged on the surface. Along with the general criticism that organic compounds would not survive long in hot, high pressure conditions, they pointed out several flaws in the experiment. In his book, Genesis, Hazen acknowledges that Stanley Miller "was basically right" about the experiments, but argues that "the art of science isn't necessarily to avoid mistakes; rather, progress is often made by making mistakes as fast as possible, while avoiding making the same mistake twice." In subsequent work, the group formed biomolecules from carbon dioxide and water and catalyzed the formation of amino acids using oxides and sulfides of transition metals; and different transition elements catalyze different organic reactions.

=== Homochirality ===
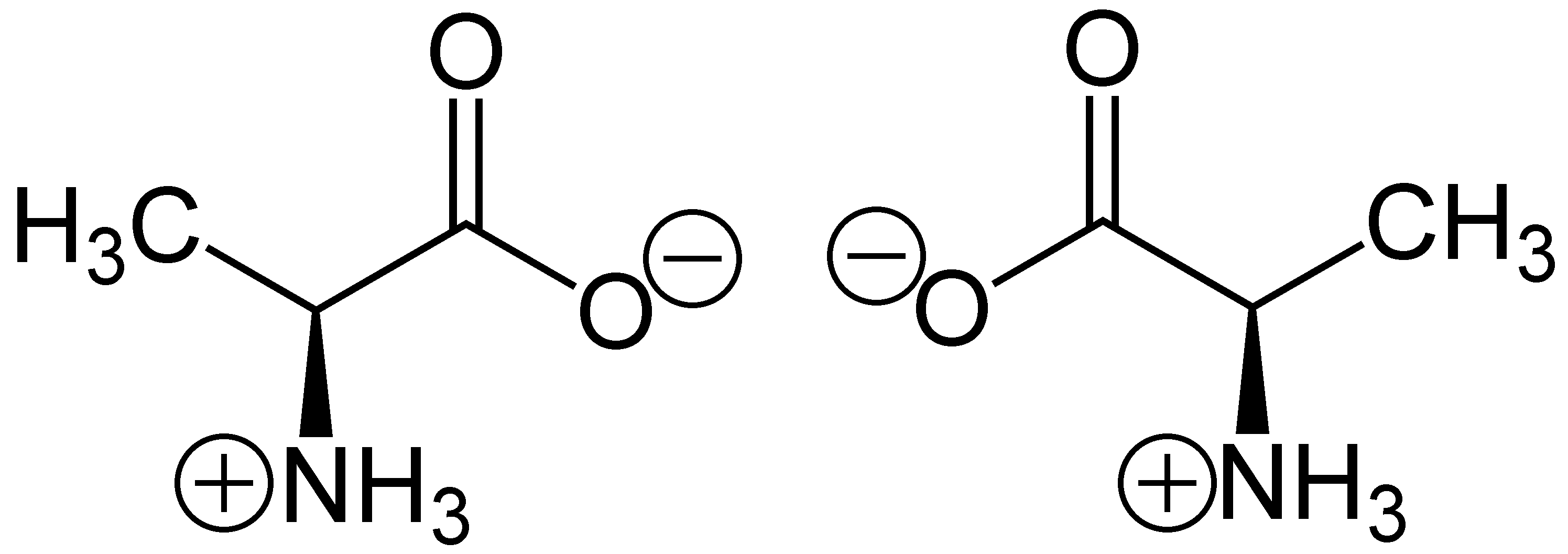
The mirror-image forms of alanine

Organic molecules often come in two mirror-image forms, often referred to as "right-handed" and "left-handed". This handedness is called chirality. For example, the amino acid alanine comes in a right-handed (D-alanine) and a left-handed (L-alanine) form. Living cells are very selective, choosing amino acids only in the left-handed form and sugars in the right-handed form. However, most abiotic processes produce an equal amount of each. Somehow life must have developed this preference (homochirality); but while scientists have proposed several theories, they have no consensus on the mechanism.

Hazen investigated the possibility that organic molecules might acquire a chiral asymmetry when grown on the faces of mineral crystals. Some, like quartz, come in mirror-image forms; others, like calcite, are symmetric about their centers but their faces come in pairs with opposite chirality. With Tim Filley, an expert at organic chemical analysis, and Glenn Goodfriend, a geochemist, Hazen cleaned large calcite crystals and dipped them into aspartic acid. They found that each face of the crystal had a small preference for either left- or right-handed forms of aspartate. They proposed that a similar mechanism might work on other amino acids and sugars. This work attracted a lot of interest from the pharmaceutical industry, which needs to produce some of their drugs with a pure chirality.

== Mineral evolution ==
At a Christmas party in 2006, the biophysicist Harold Morowitz asked Hazen whether there were clay minerals during the Archean Eon. Hazen could not recall a mineralogist ever having asked whether a given mineral existed in a given era, and it occurred to him that no one had ever explored how Earth's mineralogy changed over time. He worked on this question for a year with his closest colleague, geochemist Dimitri Sverjensky at Johns Hopkins University, and some other collaborators including a mineralogist, Robert Downs; a petrologist, John Ferry; and a geobiologist, Dominic Papineau. The result was a paper in American Mineralogist that provided a new historical context to mineralogy that they called mineral evolution.

Based on a review of the literature, Hazen and his co-authors estimated that the number of minerals in the Solar System has grown from about a dozen at the time of its formation to over 4300 at present. (As of 2026, the latter number has grown to 6239.). They predicted that there was a systematic increase in the number of mineral species over time, and identified three main eras of change: the formation of the Solar System and planets; the reworking of crust and mantle and the onset of plate tectonics; and the appearance of life. After the first era, there were 250 minerals; after the second, 1500. The remainder were made possible by the action of living organisms, particularly the addition of oxygen to the atmosphere. This paper was followed over the next few years by several studies concentrating on one chemical element at a time and mapping out the first appearances of minerals involving each element.

A “system of mineralogy” is a classification scheme for all known kinds of minerals. In 2019, Hazen proposed an "evolutionary system of mineralogy," a classification scheme grounded in the concept of mineral evolution and based on the detailed properties of mineral specimens. The evolutionary system is intended to complement the official mineral classification system of the International Mineralogical Association (IMA) system, which is supervised by the IMA's Commission on New Minerals, Nomenclature and Classification. Under the IMA system, each mineral species is defined by its unique combination of major-element chemical composition and crystal structure. The evolutionary system instead groups minerals into "natural kinds" by looking at how they formed, along with their real-world chemistry, structure and physical traits. This can result in a single IMA species being divided into multiple kinds. For example, whereas the IMA defines all diamond as one species, the evolutionary system recognizes several kinds of diamond distinguished by origin, including stellar diamond (formed in the atmospheres of stars), mantle diamond (formed in the Earth's deep interior), and impact diamond (formed when an asteroid strikes a carbon-rich deposit). Conversely, the evolutionary system combines some compositionally similar IMA species into a single kind, such as the magnesium- and iron-rich members of the tourmaline group. The evolutionary system also includes a variety of non-crystalline materials not recognized as minerals by the IMA, such as obsidian, amber and coal. The evolutionary system is being published in 12 parts.

== Deep Carbon Observatory ==
In 2008, the Alfred P. Sloan Foundation provided an initial grant to support a 10-year international program—the Deep Carbon Observatory—to study Earth’s carbon cycle from crust to core, with special emphasis on four scientific themes: deep life, reservoirs and fluxes, deep energy, and extreme physics and chemistry. The program, with Hazen as Principal Investigator and Executive Director, eventually enlisted 1300 scientists from 55 countries.

Hazen and his colleagues started the Carbon Mineral Challenge, a citizen science project dedicated to accelerating the discovery of "missing" carbon-bearing minerals. This effort eventually resulted in the discovery of 31 new carbon-bearing minerals.

== Time's Second Arrow ==
In 2023, Robert Hazen, Michael L. Wong, and colleagues published a paper in the Proceedings of the National Academy of Sciences suggesting a new law of increasing functional information. This concept was later expanded for general audiences in the 2026 popular science book Time’s Second Arrow: Evolution, Order, and a New Law of Nature.

According to Hazen and Wong, evolution—defined as an increase in the complexity and diversity of a system over time—applies to both living and non-living things. In order to evolve, systems must be composed of interacting components, such as cells, molecules, or atoms, for which natural processes exist to generate multiple configurations that are subjected to natural selection for functionality. Thus, only a fraction of these configurations will persist.

Hazen and Wong’s proposed law is underpinned, and can be quantified by, the conception of functional information, originated by Jack Szostak in 2003 to rigorously define the information content of biological systems.

Although the evolution of complexity in systems is consistent with the second law of thermodynamics, they cannot be derived from it. As such, Hazen and Wong proposed the introduction of a complementary new law. Like entropy, it is also an arrow of time, one that operates episodically and independently.

Hazen and Wong’s ideas, cited over 200 times in the first three years since their PNAS publication, have received both criticism and support. Their work has been applied to a wide variety of topics, including cancer research, microbiology, and large language models.

== Teaching ==
As the Clarence B. Robinson Professor at George Mason University, Hazen developed innovative courses to promote scientific literacy in both scientists and non-scientists. With physicist James Trefil, he developed a course that they described as "science appreciation", aimed at non-scientists. It was organized around a total of 20 "Great Ideas of Science" that were later reduced to 18. In addition to writing about their ideas in several magazines, they turned the course into a book, Science Matters: Achieving Scientific Literacy. They used the principles to organize explanations of a "vast number of socially significant, fundamental, or environmentally crucial topics." This was published with an amount of advance publicity that was unusual for a popular science book, including an article they wrote for the New York Times Sunday Magazine, praise from prolific author Isaac Asimov and physics Nobelist Leon Lederman, and a publicity tour. For an article in Science about the book, they provided the author with the original list of 20 ideas and invited readers to send in their comments. About 200 readers responded, generally supporting the idea of such a list while vehemently criticizing many of the particulars, including an informal style and sometimes vague language. Particularly criticized were numbers 1 ("The universe is regular and predictable") and 16 ("Everything on the earth operates in cycles"). Hazen and Trefil argued, in defense of point 1, that it was not intended as a defense of determinism and that they covered unpredictable phenomena like chaos; but they also used the responses to modify the list of ideas in subsequent editions.

Hazen and Trefil went on to write three undergraduate textbooks: The Sciences: An Integrated Approach (1993), The Physical Sciences: An Integrated Approach (1995), and Physics Matters: An Introduction to Conceptual Physics (2004). Hazen used these as the basis for a 60-lecture video and audio course called The Joy of Science.

== Public engagement ==
In 2008, Hazen was an outgoing member of the AAAS Committee on Public Understanding of Science and Technology. He and his wife Margee, noting that it is important for scientists to engage with the public but actually doing so does not help them get tenure, proposed a new award, The Early Career Award for Public Engagement with Science, and established a fund for it. The first award, with a monetary prize of $5,000, was announced in 2010.

== Honors ==
Hazen is a Fellow of the American Association for the Advancement of Science.

The Mineralogical Society of America presented Hazen with the Mineralogical Society of America Award in 1982 and the Distinguished Public Service Medal in 2009. In 2016, he received its highest award, the Roebling Medal. He also served as Distinguished Lecturer and is a Past President of the Society. A mineral that was discovered in Mono Lake was named hazenite in his honor by Hexiong Yang, a former student of his.

In 1986, Hazen received the Ipatieff Prize, which the American Chemical Society awards in recognition of "outstanding chemical experimental work in the field of catalysis or high pressure".

For the book The Music Men, he and his wife Margaret received the Deems Taylor Award from the American Society of Composers, Authors and Publishers in 1989.

For his popular and educational science writing, Hazen received the E.A. Wood Science Writing Award from the American Crystallographic Association in 1998,

In 2012, the State Council of Higher Education for Virginia presented Hazen with its Outstanding Faculty Award.

In 2014, Hazen was elected a Fellow of the Geochemical Society.

In 2015, Hazen was elected a Fellow of the Geological Society of America.

In 2019, Hazen was named a Fellow of the American Geophysical Union. That year he was also elected a Foreign Member of the Russian Academy of Sciences.

In 2021, Hazen was awarded the Medal of Excellence in Mineralogical Sciences from the International Mineralogical Association.

In 2022, Hazen was granted an honorary doctorate of science by the American Museum of Natural History’s Richard Gilder Graduate School.

In 2025, Hazen was awarded the Marcus Milling Legendary Geoscientist Medal in by the American Geoscience Institute, “in recognition of his lifetime of notable achievements in the geosciences and global impact across disciplines.”

Hazen has presented numerous named lectures at universities. He gave a Directorate for Biological Sciences Distinguished Lecture at the National Science Foundation in 2007, and was named the Sigma Xi Distinguished Lecturer for 2008–2010. In 2011, Hazen gave the Uppsala University Linnaeus Lecture. In 2025, he was chosen as the Hallimond Lecturer by the Mineralogical Society of Great Britain and Ireland and the Howard Flack Lecturer by the Swiss Crystallographic Society.

Two fossil species, the Upper Miocene fossil dolphin, Cammackacetus hazenorum, and the Upper Miocene fossil hermit crab, Pagurus hazenorum, have been named in honor of Hazen and his wife Margaret.

== Publications ==
Hazen is author of more than 400 articles and 20 books on science, history, and music.

=== Refereed articles ===
Hazen has more than 400 refereed publications that have been cited a total of over 38,000 times, for an h-index of 103 (as of September 2026). A selection of articles follows:

- Hazen, R. M.; Wones, D. R. (1971). "The effect of cation substitution on the physical properties of trioctahedral micas". American Mineralogist. 57: 103–129.
- —; Burnham, C.W. (1973). "The crystal structures of one-layer phlogopite and annite". American Mineralogist. 58: 889–900.
- — (1976). "Effects of temperature and pressure on the crystal structure of forsterite". American Mineralogist. 61: 1280–1293.
- —; Prewitt, C. T. (1977). "Effects of temperature and pressure on interatomic distances in oxygen-based minerals". Elastic Properties and Equations of State. Vol. 62. pp. 309–315. doi:10.1029/SP026p0407. ISBN 978-0-87590-240-1.
- —; Finger, L. W.; Angel, R. J.; Prewitt, C. T.; Ross, N. L.; Mao, H. K.; Hadidiacos, C. G.; Hor, P. H.; Meng, R. L.; Chu, C. W. (1 May 1987). "Crystallographic description of phases in the Y-Ba-Cu-O superconductor". Physical Review B. 35 (13): 7238–7241. Bibcode:1987PhRvB..35.7238H. doi:10.1103/PhysRevB.35.7238. PMID 9941012.
- —; Prewitt, C. T.; Angel, R. J.; Ross, N. L.; Finger, L. W.; Hadidiacos, C. G.; Veblen, D. R.; Heaney, P. J.; Hor, P. H.; Meng, R. L.; Sun, Y. Y.; Wang, Y. Q.; Xue, Y. Y.; Huang, Z. J.; Gao, L.; Bechtold, J.; Chu, C. W. (21 March 1988). "Superconductivity in the high-Bi-Ca-Sr-Cu-O system: Phase identification". Physical Review Letters. 60 (12): 1174–1177. Bibcode:1988PhRvL..60.1174H. doi:10.1103/PhysRevLett.60.1174. PMID 10037960.
- —; Finger, L. W.; Angel, R. J.; Prewitt, C. T.; Ross, N. L.; Hadidiacos, C. G.; Heaney, P. J.; Veblen, D. R.; Sheng, Z. Z.; El Ali, A.; Hermann, A. M. (18 April 1988). "100-K superconducting phases in the Tl-Ca-Ba-Cu-O system". Physical Review Letters. 60 (16): 1657–1660. Bibcode:1988PhRvL..60.1657H. doi:10.1103/PhysRevLett.60.1657. PMID 10038103.
- —; Filley, T. R.; Goodfriend, G. A. (1 May 2001). "Selective adsorption of L- and D-amino acids on calcite: Implications for biochemical homochirality". Proceedings of the National Academy of Sciences. 98 (10): 5487–5490. Bibcode:2001PNAS...98.5487H. doi:10.1073/pnas.101085998. PMC 33239. PMID 11331767.
- —; Sholl, David S. (June 2003). "Chiral selection on inorganic crystalline surfaces". Nature Materials. 2 (6): 367–374. Bibcode:2003NatMa...2..367H. doi:10.1038/nmat879. PMID 12776102. S2CID 10531985.
- —; Papineau, D.; Bleeker, W.; Downs, R. T.; Ferry, J. M.; McCoy, T. J.; Sverjensky, D. A.; Yang, H. (1 November 2008). "Mineral evolution". American Mineralogist. 93 (11–12): 1693–1720. Bibcode:2008AmMin..93.1693H. doi:10.2138/am.2008.2955. S2CID 27460479.

=== Books ===
- Hazen, Robert M. (1979). North American geology : Early writings. Benchmark papers in geology. Vol. 51. Stroudsburg, PA: Dowden, Hutchinson & Ross. ISBN 978-0879333454.
- — (1982). The Poetry of Geology. London: George Allen and Unwin. ISBN 0-04-808032-2.
- —; Finger, Larry W. (1982). Comparative crystal chemistry : temperature, pressure, composition, and the variation of crystal structure. Chichester: Wiley. ISBN 978-0471102687.
- Hazen, Margaret Hindle; Hazen, Robert M. (1985). Wealth inexhaustible : a history of America's mineral industries to 1850. New York: Van Nostrand Reinhold. ISBN 978-0442235109.
- Hazen, Robert M. (1988). The breakthrough : the race for the superconductor. New York: Summit Books. ISBN 978-0671658298.
- Hazen, Margaret Hindle; Hazen, Robert M. (1987). The music men : an illustrated history of brass bands in America, 1800–1920. Washington, D.C.: Smithsonian Institution Press. ISBN 978-0874745467.
- Hazen, Robert M.; Trefil, James (1991). Science matters : achieving scientific literacy. New York: Doubleday. ISBN 978-0385247962.
- Hazen, Margaret Hindle; Hazen, Robert M. (1992). Keepers of the flame : the role of fire in American culture, 1775–1925. Princeton, NJ: Princeton University Press. ISBN 978-0691048093.
- Hazen, Robert M. (1993). The new alchemists : breaking through the barriers of high pressure. New York: Times Books. ISBN 978-0812922752.
- —; James, Trefil (1996). The physical sciences : an integrated approach. New York: Wiley. ISBN 978-0471154402.
- — (1997). Why aren't black holes black? : the unanswered questions at the frontiers of science. New York: Anchor Books. ISBN 978-0385480147.
- — (1999). The diamond makers (Revised ed.). New York: Cambridge University Press. ISBN 978-0521654746.
- James, Trefil; Hazen, Robert M. (2004). Physics matter : an introduction to conceptual physics. J. Wiley. ISBN 978-0471150589.
- Hazen, Robert M. (2005). Genesis : the scientific quest for life's origins. Washington, D.C.: Joseph Henry. ISBN 978-0-309-10310-7.
- — (2013). The story of Earth : the first 4.5 billion years, from stardust to living planet. New York: Penguin Books. ISBN 978-0143123644.
- — (2019). Symphony in C : carbon and the evolution of (almost) everything. New York: W. W. Norton & Company. ISBN 978-0393609431.
- Hazen, Robert M. and Wong, Michael L. (2026) Time's second arrow: evolution, order, and a new law of nature. New York: W. W. Norton & Company. ISBN 978-1-324-10548-0.

== Family ==
Hazen's wife, Margee (née Margaret Joan Hindle), is a science writer and published historian. Her late father, Howard Brooke Hindle, PhD (1918–2001), was a historian who studied the role of material culture in the history of the United States and served as Director of the National Museum of American History from 1974 to 1978. Hazen's late brother, Dan Chapin Hazen, PhD (1947–2015), was an academic research librarian who had been affiliated with the libraries at Harvard, and was particularly recognized for his accomplishments to the Center for Research Libraries and advocacy of collections from Latin America. Harvard has memorialized Dan Hazen by establishing two chairs in his name. The Hazens have two children: Benjamin Hindle Hazen (born 1976) and Elizabeth Brooke Hazen (born 1978).
