= Weeksite =

Mineral

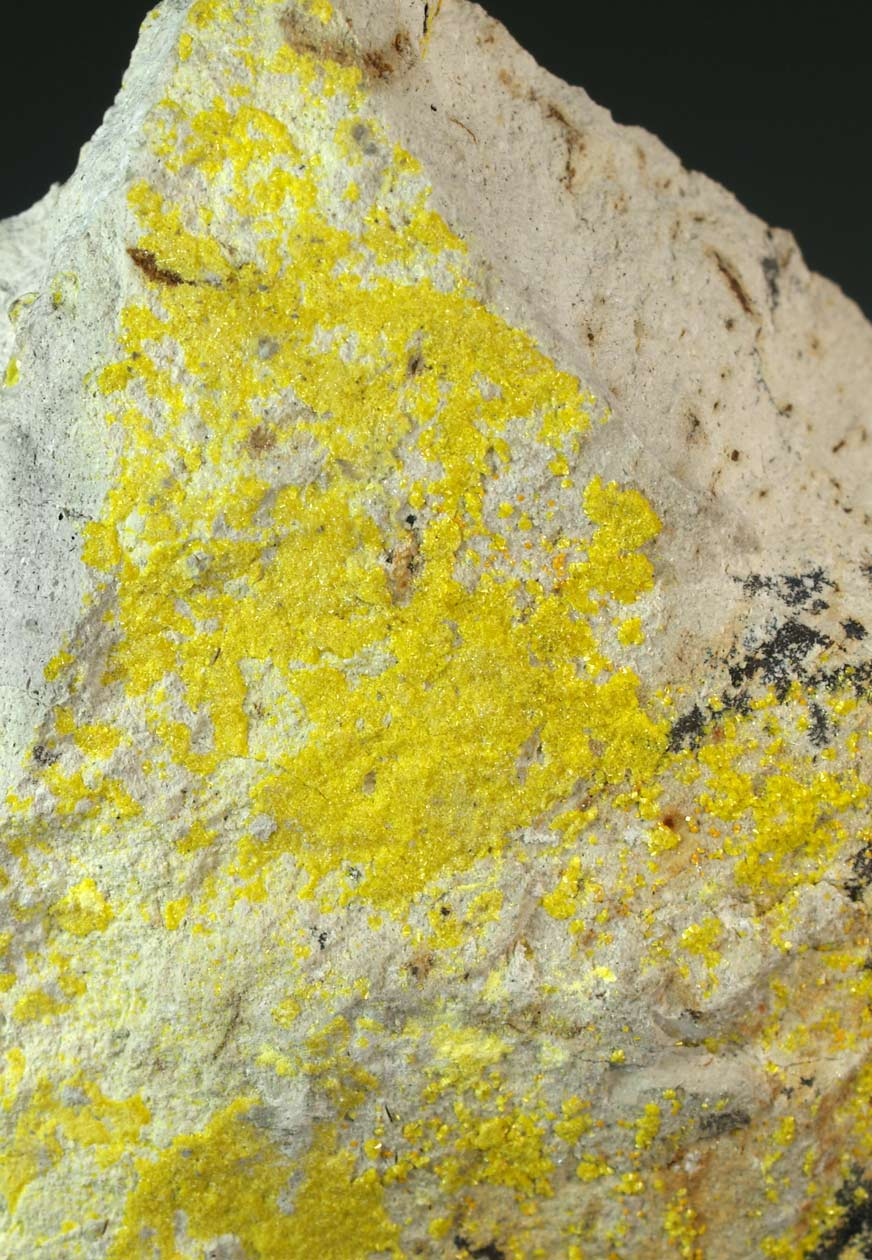

General
- Category: Silicate mineral
- Formula: K_{2}(UO_{2})_{2}Si_{6}O_{15}·4(H_{2}O)
- IMA symbol: Wks
- Strunz classification: 9.AK.30
- Crystal system: Orthorhombic
- Crystal class: Dipyramidal (mmm); H-M symbol: (2/m 2/m 2/m)
- Space group: Pnnb (no. 52)
- Unit cell: a = 14.26 Å, b = 35.88 Å c = 14.2 Å; Z = 16

Identification
- Colour: Yellow
- Crystal habit: Occurs as acicular to elongated bladed crystals, flattened on {010}, also as radiating fibrous clusters and spherulites, pseudotetragonal
- Cleavage: Distinct prismatic
- Mohs scale hardness: 1–2
- Lustre: Waxy to silky
- Streak: Yellow
- Diaphaneity: Transparent to translucent
- Specific gravity: 4.1
- Optical properties: Biaxial (−)
- Refractive index: n_{α} = 1.596 n_{β} = 1.603 n_{γ} = 1.606
- Birefringence: δ = 0.010
- Pleochroism: X = colorless; Y = pale yellow-green; Z = yellow-green
- 2V angle: Measured: 60°
- Other characteristics: Radioactive greater than 70 Bq/g

Weeksite is a naturally occurring uranium silicate mineral with the chemical formula: K_{2}(UO_{2})_{2}Si_{6}O_{15}•4(H_{2}O), potassium uranyl silicate. Weeksite has a Mohs hardness of 1–2. It was named for USGS mineralogist Alice Mary Dowse Weeks (1909–1988).

== Appearance ==
Weeksite is visually similar to other uranium minerals such as carnotite and zippeite, both being encrustations that form on other rocks (usually sandstones or limestones).

== Occurrence ==
Weeksite was first described in 1960 for an occurrence on Topaz Mountain, Thomas Range, Juab County, Utah.

Weeksite occurs within small "opal" veins within rhyolite and agglomerates, and as encrustations in sandstones and limestones. It occurs associated with opal, chalcedony, calcite, gypsum, fluorite, uraninite, thorogummite, uranophane, boltwoodite, carnotite and margaritasite.

== See also ==
- List of minerals – List of minerals with Wikipedia articles
- List of minerals named after people
- Mineral evolution
