= Alice Mary Weeks =

American geologist (1909–1988)

Alice Mary Dowse Weeks
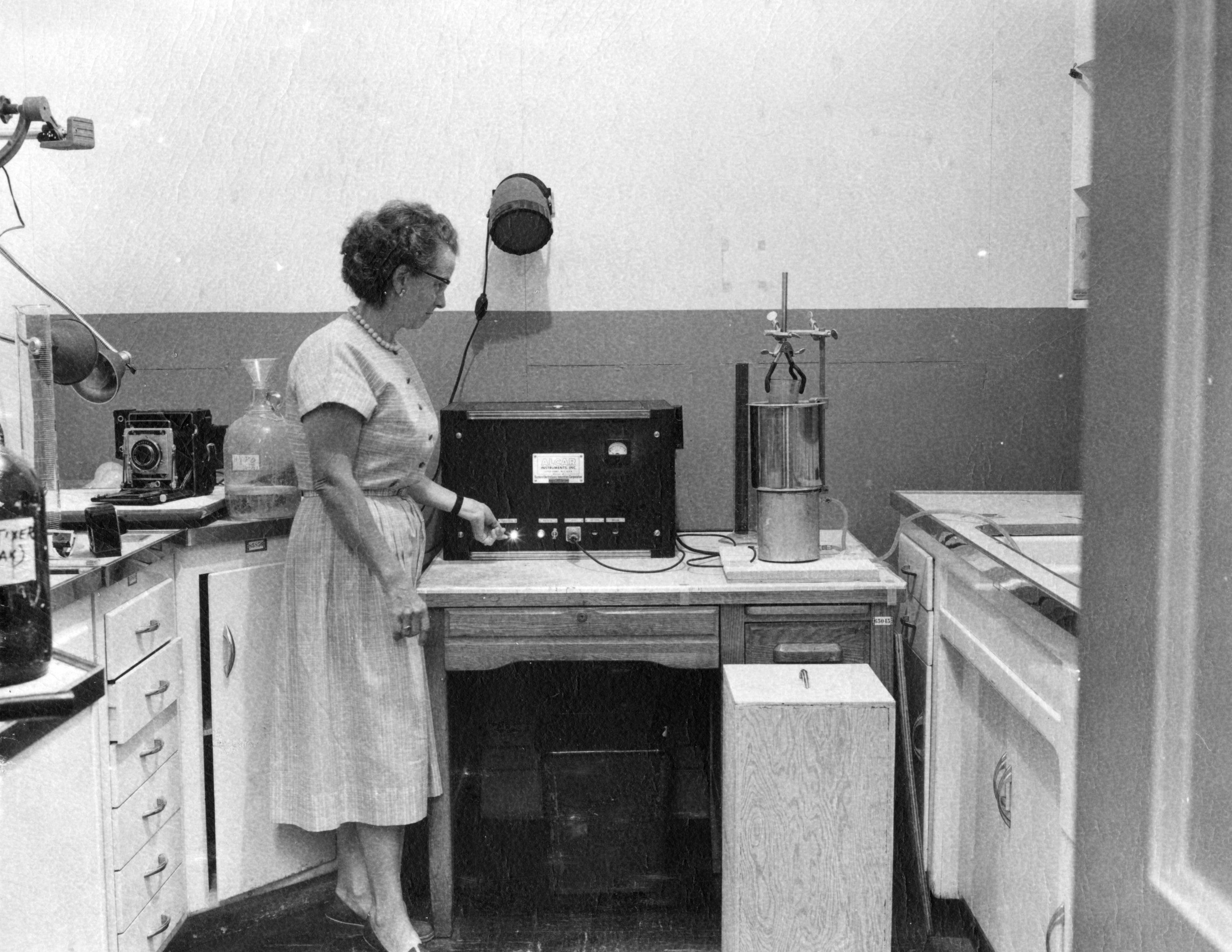
- Alice Dowse Weeks, Geologist, operating an ultrasonic generator. Rapid Rock Analysis Laboratory, USGS Geologic Division, Washington, D.C. 1958.
- Born: August 26, 1909; Sherborn, Massachusetts, US
- Died: August 29, 1988 (aged 79); Wynnewood, Pennsylvania, US
- Education: Tufts University, Harvard University
- Occupation: Geologist
- Spouse: Albert W. Weeks

Alice Mary Dowse Weeks (August 26, 1909 – August 29, 1988) was an American geologist. Weeksite is named after her. She identified uranophane in 1953 along with Mary E. Thompson. Weeks was the first to propose the concept of oxidation of ore deposits that contain uranium, vanadium, and other accessory metals. She founded the Geology Department at Temple University in Philadelphia, and was a strong proponent of women in geology.

== Early life and family ==
Alice Mary Dowse Weeks and her twin sister Eunice were born August 26, 1909, in Sherborn Massachusetts. Alice's mother Jessie Parker Dowse was raised in Uxbridge, Massachusetts and attended Tufts University. Jessie worked as a teacher until marrying Arthur Dowse, who worked as a banker among other occupations. Alice Weeks' mother was an advocate for her children's education, and encouraged them to learn at a young age, as well as being an advocate for women's rights.

Alice married Dr. Albert Weeks, a long-term friend and companion, in May 1950. Albert, a petroleum geologist, encouraged Alice in her career and helped to motivate her to complete her dissertation.

== Education ==
Alice, who was homeschooled in her early years, attended and graduated from Sawin Academy and Dowse High School in 1926. She then attended Tufts University, receiving a degree in science and mathematics and graduating cum laude in 1930. After teaching at the Lancaster school for girls for roughly two and a half years, she returned to Tufts to take several geology courses. Following the end of her time at Tufts, she attended Harvard University in Massachusetts for graduate school, where she received her master's of science degree in 1934. Due to financial instability, and the additional pressures of being a woman in science at Harvard, Weeks was unable to continue working towards her doctorate. Allegedly, she had to sit outside of classrooms for certain lectures that did not permit women to attend. She accepted a Research Fellowship at Bryn Mawr College, Pennsylvania, and after a year began working there as a laboratory instructor. After another year working at Bryn Mawr, Weeks returned to Harvard to continue to work towards her doctorate in 1936.

During this time, Weeks also began working as a professor at Wellesley College, Massachusetts, as a laboratory instructor of historical and physical geology, geomorphology, cartography, and much more. She later became a member of the faculty as an assistant professor. Her knowledge and skill in cartography, as well as being ambidextrous, led to her teaching map-making to Navy officers during World War II. Due to the constraints and rationing that came with the war, it wasn't until 1949 when Weeks was awarded her doctorate.

== Career and legacy ==
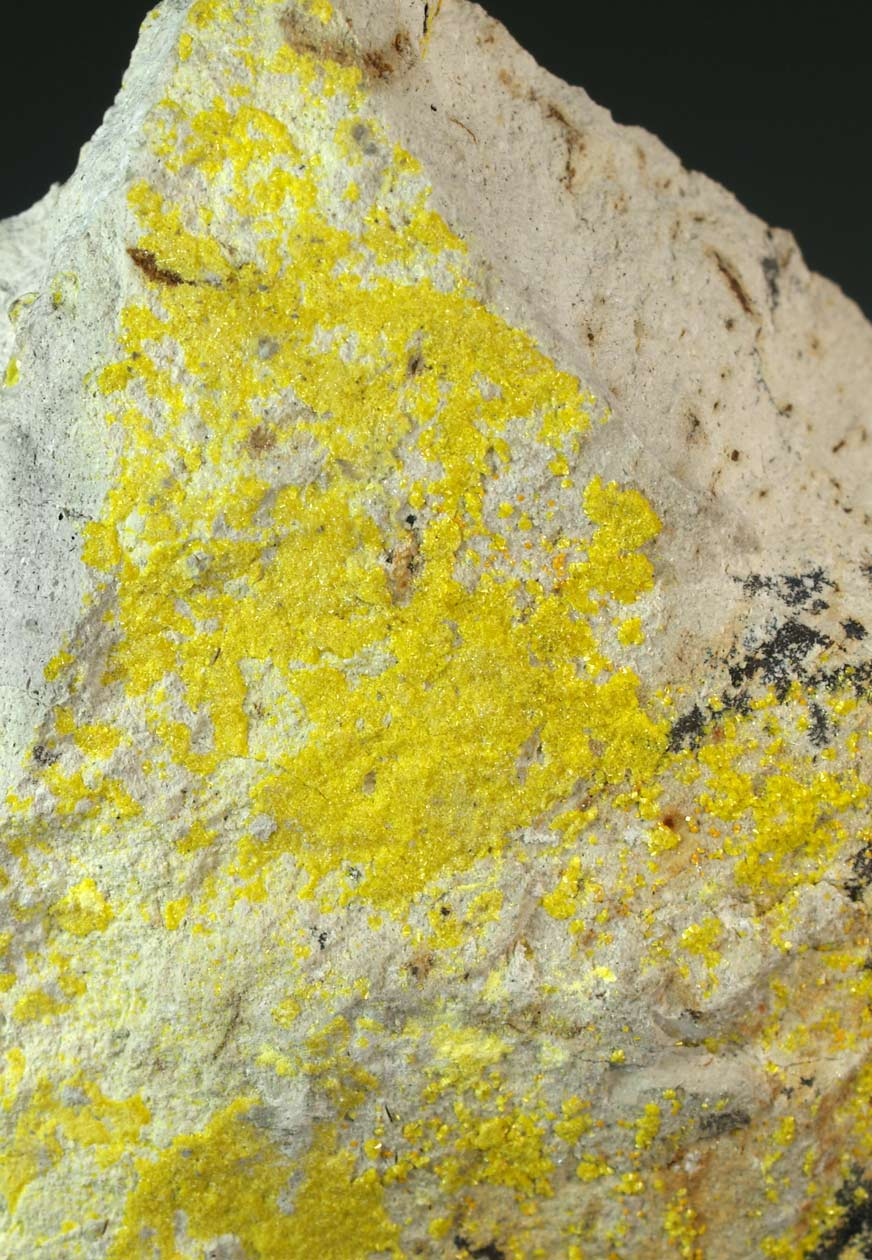
Uranium silicate mineral, Weeksite

Weeks' work focused on radioactive deposits, from 1949 to 1961 she worked for the USGS Uranium Exploration. Weeks was a charter member of the Women Geoscientists Committee of the American Geological Institute, she earned fellowships at the Geological Society of America, the Mineralogical Society of America, and the American Association for the Advancement of Science. Weeks later went on to become a professor of mineralogy at Temple University in Philadelphia, where she founded their Geology Department. Weeksite, a uranium silicate mineral, is named after her. Weeks is also recognized for identifying uranophane in 1953 along with Mary E. Thompson of the United States Geological Survey, and was the first to propose the concept of oxidation of ore deposits that contain uranium, vanadium, and other accessory metals.

In 1994 the estate of Albert and Alice Weeks established a special endowment at the University of Wisconsin-Madison which supports a Distinguished Professorship and other programs.

== Role of women in science ==
During Weeks' time, women were not widely accepted in the world of geology, and she occasionally was not permitted to attend specific classes, having to sit outside. In order to collect samples from uranium mines, Weeks was forced to dress up as a man to evade the superstition against allowing women to enter mines. As one of the first woman geologists, she was listed in American Men of Science well before it was changed to American Men and Women of Science.

Alice Mary Weeks was a member of the Women Geoscientists Committee of the American Geological Institute.

== Later life and death ==
In 1976, Weeks retired from Temple University, and in 1980 the Northeastern Section of the Geological Society of America held a symposium on uranium in her honor. Weeks died on August 27, 1988, following Alzheimer's disease; her sister Eunice also had Alzheimer's.

== Contributions ==
Co-wrote:

- Mineralogy and Oxidation of the Colorado Plateau Uranium Ores
- Coconninoite a New Uranium Mineral from Utah and Arizona
- Navajoite, a New Vanadium Oxide from Arizona
- Identification and Occurrence of Uranium and Vanadium Minerals from the Colorado Plateaus
- Rabbittite, a new uranyl carbonate from Utah
- Mineralogy of the zippeite group
- Grantsite, a new hydrated sodium calcium vanadate from New Mexico, Colorado and Utah
- Hendersonite, a new calcium vanadyl vanadate from Colorado and New Mexico
