= Mineral evolution =

Increasing mineral diversity over time

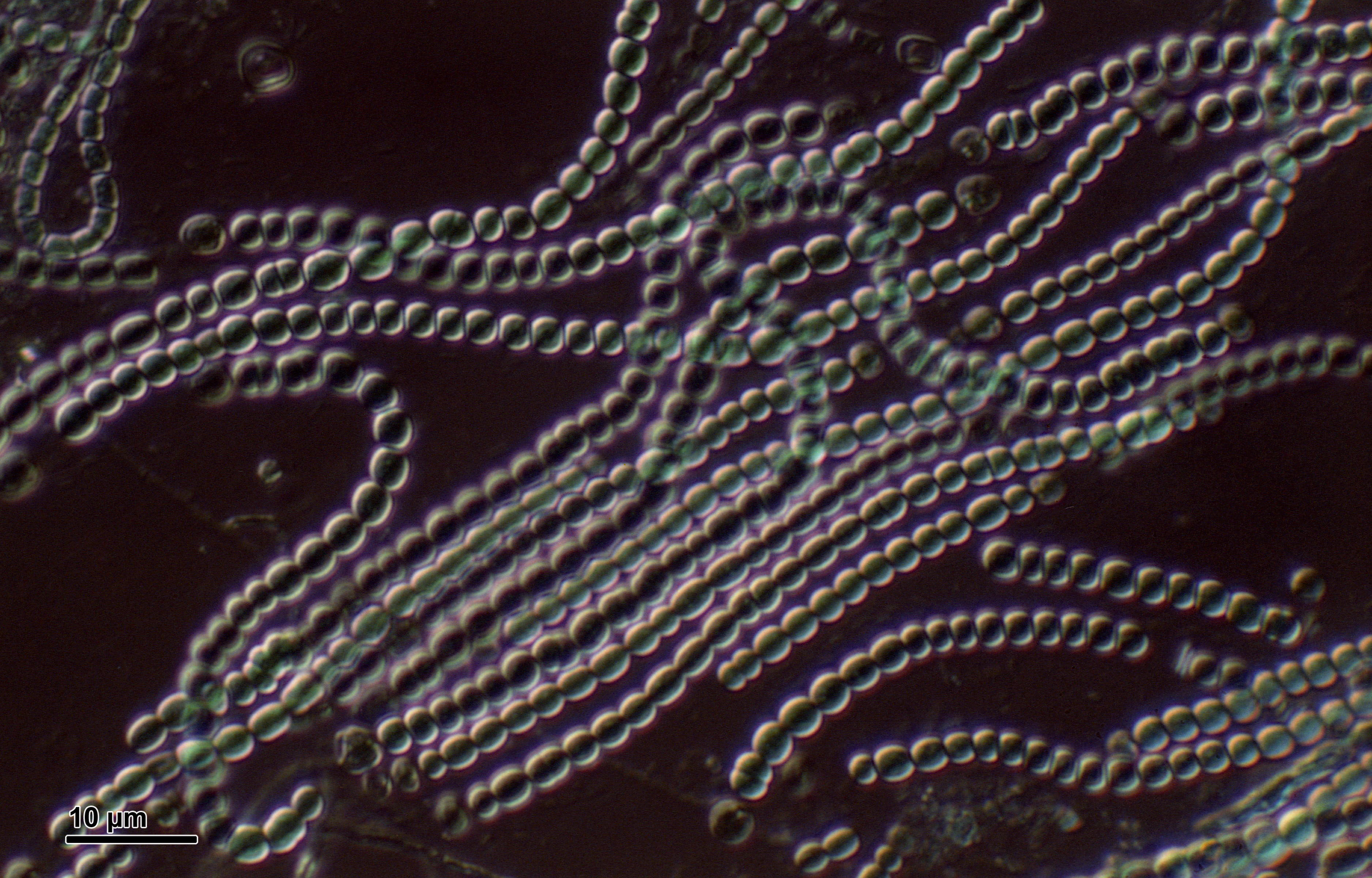
Most minerals on Earth formed after photosynthesis by cyanobacteria (pictured) began adding oxygen to the atmosphere.

Mineral evolution is a recent hypothesis that provides historical context to mineralogy. It postulates that mineralogy on planets and moons becomes increasingly complex as a result of changes in the physical, chemical and biological environment. In the Solar System, the number of mineral species has grown from about a dozen to over 5400 as a result of three processes: separation and concentration of elements; greater ranges of temperature and pressure coupled with the action of volatiles; and new chemical pathways provided by living organisms.

On Earth, there were three eras of mineral evolution. The birth of the Sun and formation of asteroids and planets increased the number of minerals to about 250. Repeated reworking of the crust and mantle through processes such as partial melting and plate tectonics increased the total to about 1500. The remaining minerals, more than two-thirds of the total, were the result of chemical changes mediated by living organisms, with the largest increase occurring after the Great Oxygenation Event.

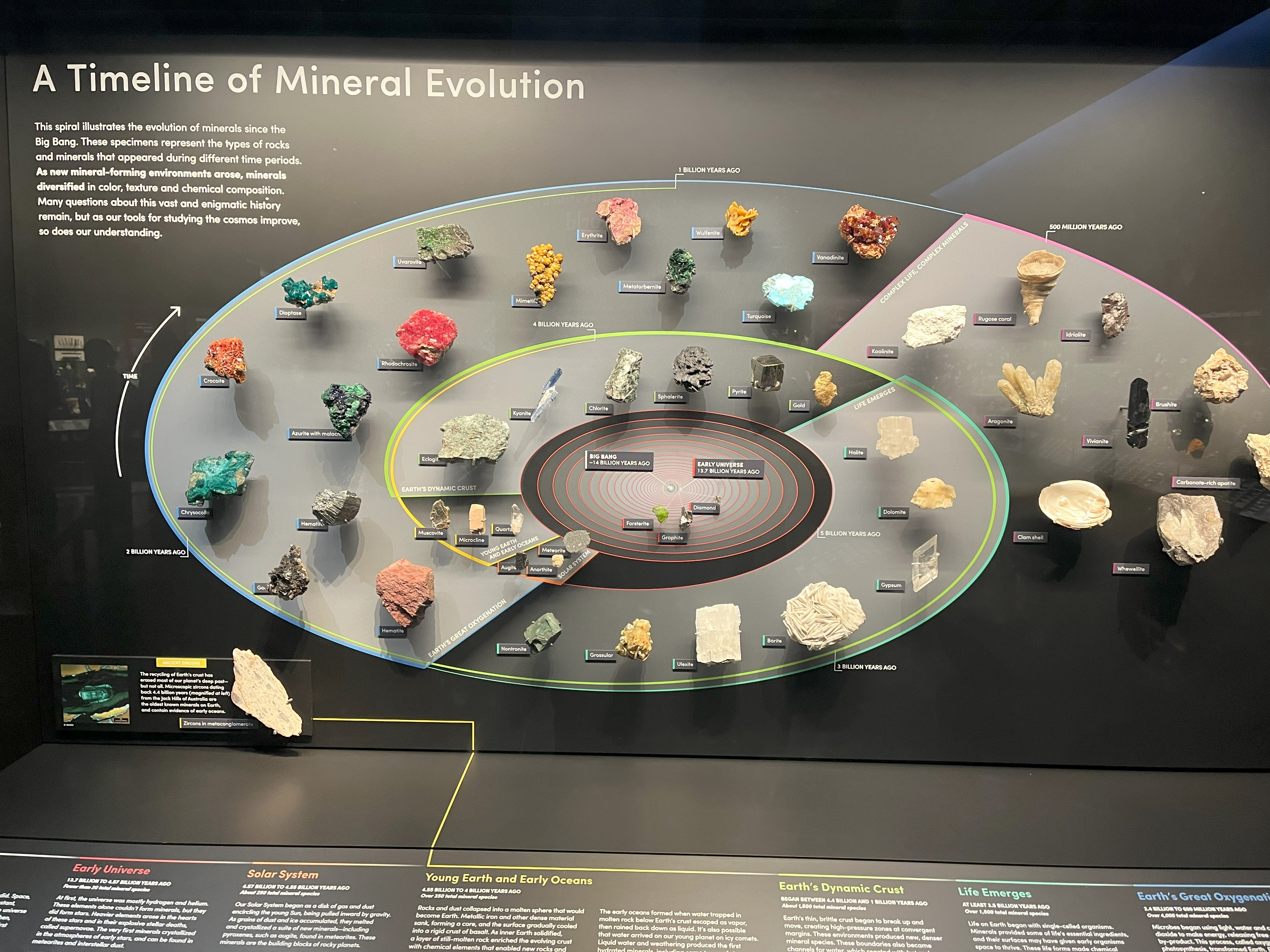
Mineral evolution

== Use of the term "evolution" ==
In the 2008 paper that introduced the term "mineral evolution", Robert Hazen and co-authors recognized that an application of the word "evolution" to minerals was likely to be controversial, although there were precedents as far back as the 1928 book The Evolution of the Igneous Rocks by Norman Bowen. They used the term in the sense of an irreversible sequence of events leading to increasingly complex and diverse assemblages of minerals. Unlike biological evolution, it does not involve mutation, competition or passing of information to progeny. Hazen et al. explored some other analogies, including the idea of extinction. Some mineral-forming processes no longer occur, such as those that produced certain minerals in enstatite chondrites that are unstable on Earth in its oxidized state. Also, the runaway greenhouse effect on Venus may have led to permanent losses of mineral species. However, mineral extinction is not truly irreversible; a lost mineral could emerge again if suitable environmental conditions were re-established.

== Presolar minerals ==
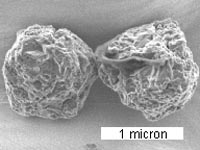
Presolar grains ("stardust") from the Murchison meteorite provide information on the first minerals.

In the early Universe, there were no minerals because the only elements available were hydrogen, helium and trace amounts of lithium. Mineral formation became possible after heavier elements, including carbon, oxygen, silicon and nitrogen, were synthesized in stars. In the expanding atmospheres of red giants and the ejecta from supernovae, microscopic minerals formed at temperatures above 1,500 °C (2,730 °F).

Evidence of these minerals can be found in interstellar grains incorporated into primitive meteorites called chondrites, which are essentially cosmic sedimentary rocks. The number of known species is roughly a dozen, although several more materials have been identified but not classified as minerals. Because it has a high crystallization temperature (about 4,400 °C (7,950 °F)), diamond was probably the first mineral to form. This was followed by graphite, oxides (rutile, corundum, spinel, hibonite), carbides (moissanite), nitrides (osbornite and silicon nitride) and silicates (forsterite and silicate perovskite (MgSiO_{3})). These "ur-minerals" seeded the molecular clouds from which the Solar system was formed.

== Processes ==
After the formation of the Solar system, mineral evolution was driven by three primary mechanisms: the separation and concentration of elements; greater ranges of temperature and pressure combined with chemical action of volatiles; and new reaction pathways driven by living organisms.

=== Separation and concentration ===
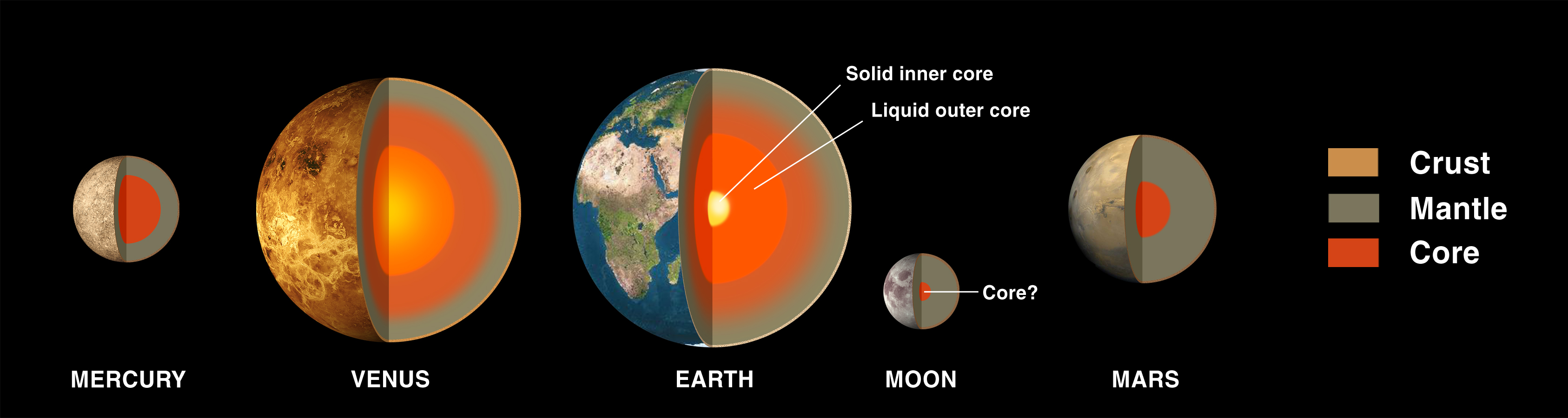
Cutaway views of some terrestrial planets, showing the layers

The highest level in the classification of minerals is based on chemical composition. However, the defining elements for many mineral groups, such as boron in borates and phosphorus in phosphates, were at first only present in concentrations of parts per million or less. This left little or no chance for them to come together and form minerals until external influences concentrated them. Processes that separate and concentrate elements include planetary differentiation (for example, separation into layers such as a core and mantle); outgassing; fractional crystallization; and partial melting.

=== Intensive variables and volatiles ===
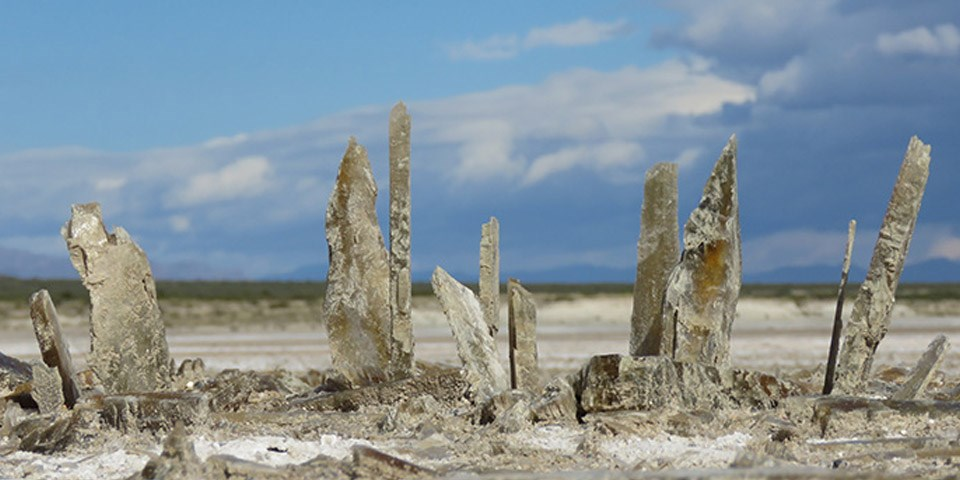
Gypsum crystals formed as the water evaporated in Lake Lucero, New Mexico

Allowable combinations of elements in minerals are determined by thermodynamics; for an element to be added to a crystal at a given location, it must reduce the energy. At higher temperatures, many elements are interchangeable in minerals such as olivine. As a planet cools, minerals became exposed to a greater range of intensive variables such as temperature and pressure, allowing the formation of new phases and more specialized combinations of elements such as clay minerals and zeolites. New minerals are formed when volatile compounds such as water, carbon dioxide and O_{2} react with them. Environments such as ice caps, dry lakes, and exhumed metamorphic rock have distinctive suites of minerals.

=== Biological influence ===
Life has made dramatic changes in the environment. Most dramatic was the Great Oxygenation Event, about 2.4 billion years ago, in which photosynthetic organisms flooded the atmosphere with oxygen. Living organisms also catalyze reactions, creating minerals such as aragonite that are not in equilibrium with their surroundings.

== Chronology ==
Before the formation of the Solar System, there were about 12 minerals. The estimate for the current number of minerals has been changing rapidly. In 2008, it was 4300, but as of November 2018 there were 5413 officially recognized mineral species.

In their chronology for Earth, Hazen et al. (2008) separated the changes in mineral abundance into three broad intervals: planetary accretion up to 4.55 Ga (billion years ago); reworking of Earth's crust and mantle between 4.55 Ga and 2.5 Ga; and biological influences after 2.5 Ga. They further divided the ages into 10 intervals, some of which overlap. In addition, some of the dates are uncertain; for example, estimates of the onset of modern plate tectonics range from 4.5 Ga to 1.0 Ga.

Eras and stages of Earth's mineral evolution
Era/stage		Age (Ga)	Cumulative no. of species
Prenebular "Ur-minerals"	—N/a	>4.6	12
Era of planetary accretion (>4.55 Ga)	1. Sun ignites, heating nebula	>4.56	60
Era of planetary accretion (>4.55 Ga)	2. Planetesimals form	>4.56–4.55	250
Era of crust and mantle reworking (4.55–2.5 Ga)	3. Igneous rock evolution	4.55–4.0	350–420 (Note: The 420 is for "phases that might have played a significant role in Hadean geochemical processes"; there are also more than 100 rare minerals.)
Era of crust and mantle reworking (4.55–2.5 Ga)	4. Granitoid and pegmatite formation	4.0–3.5	1000
Era of crust and mantle reworking (4.55–2.5 Ga)	5. Plate tectonics	>3.0	1500
Era of biologically mediated mineralogy (2.5 Ga – present)	6. Anoxic biological world	3.9–2.5	1500
Era of biologically mediated mineralogy (2.5 Ga – present)	7. Great Oxidation Event	2.5–1.9	>4000
Era of biologically mediated mineralogy (2.5 Ga – present)	8. Intermediate ocean	1.85–0.85	>4000
Era of biologically mediated mineralogy (2.5 Ga – present)	9. Snowball Earth events	0.85–0.542	>4000
Era of biologically mediated mineralogy (2.5 Ga – present)	10. Phanerozoic era of biomineralization	<0.542	>5413

=== Planetary accretion ===
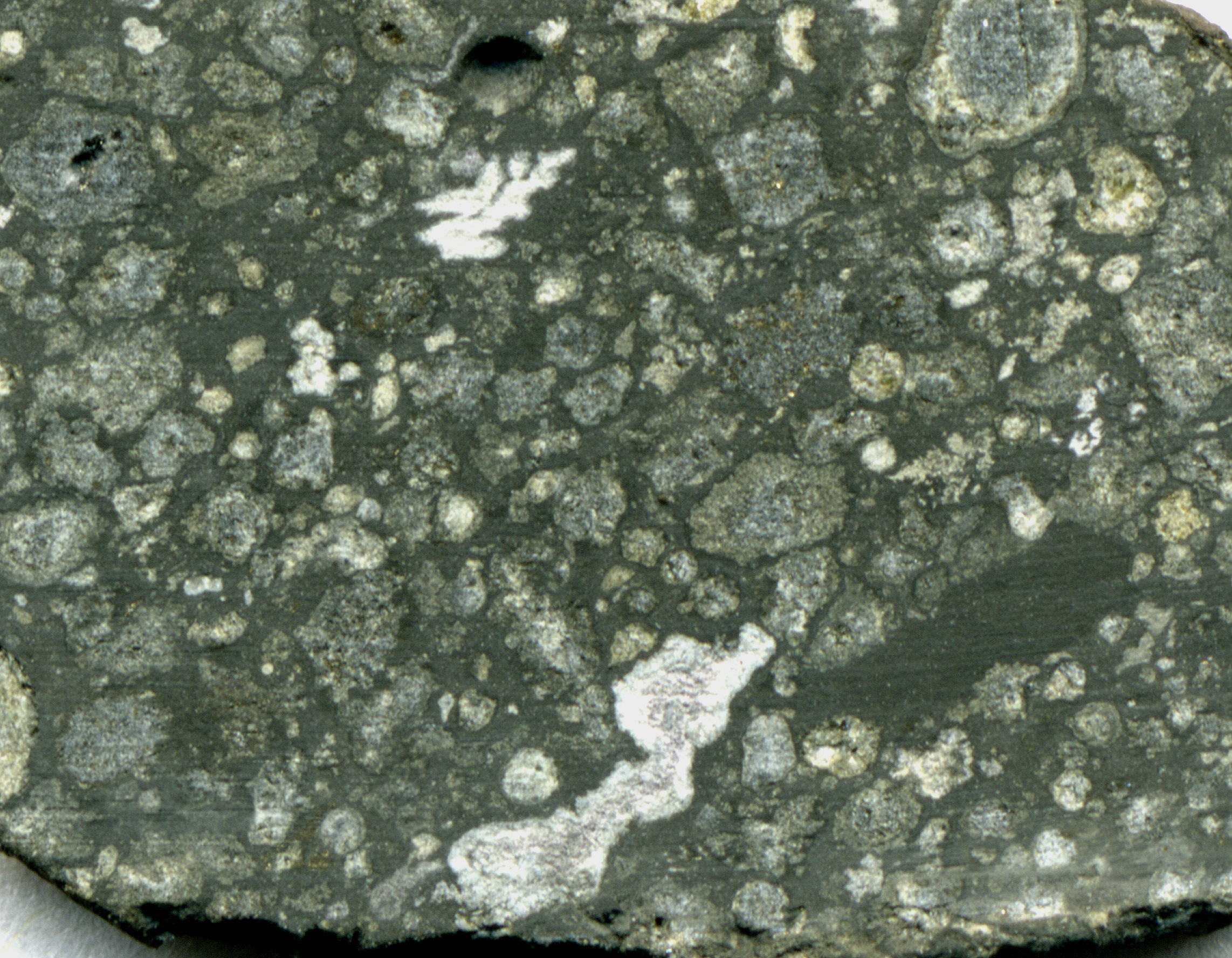
Cross-section of a chondrite containing round olivine chondrules and irregular white CAIs

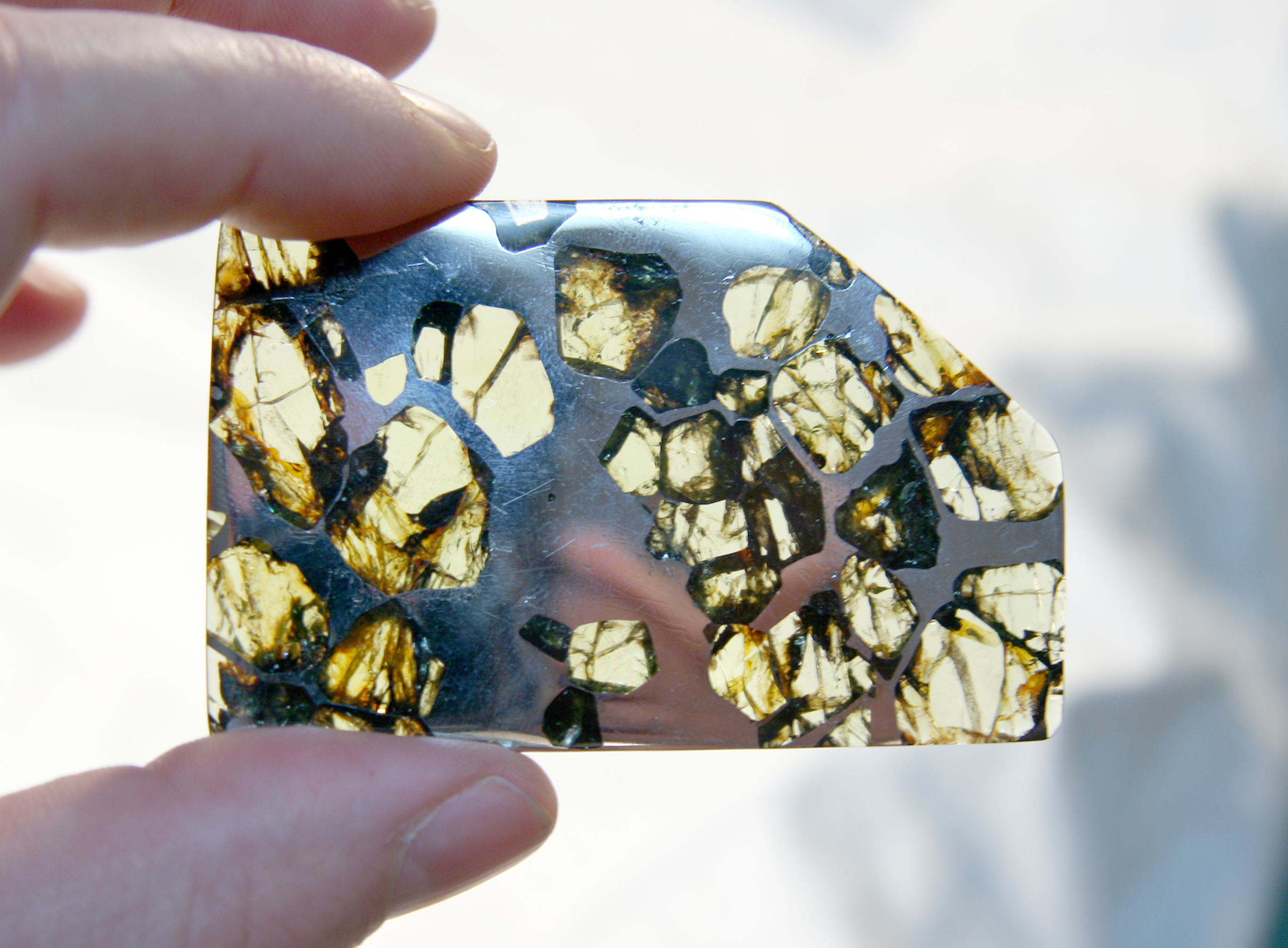
Sample of a pallasite with olivine crystals in an iron-nickel matrix

In the first era, the Sun ignited, heating the surrounding molecular cloud. 60 new minerals were produced and were preserved as inclusions in chondrites. The accretion of dust into asteroids and planets, bombardments, heating and reactions with water raised the number to 250.

==== Stage 1: Sun ignites ====
Before 4.56 Ga, the presolar nebula was a dense molecular cloud consisting of hydrogen and helium gas with dispersed dust grains. When the Sun ignited and entered its T-Tauri phase, it melted nearby dust grains. Some of the melt droplets were incorporated into chondrites as small spherical objects called chondrules. Almost all chondrites also contain calcium–aluminium-rich inclusions (CAIs), the earliest materials formed in the Solar System. From an examination of chondrites from this era, 60 new minerals can be identified with crystal structures from all of the crystal systems. These included the first iron-nickel alloys, sulfides, phosphides, and several silicates and oxides. Among the most important were magnesium-rich olivine, magnesium-rich pyroxene, and plagioclase. Some rare minerals, produced in oxygen-poor environments no longer found on Earth, can be found in enstatite chondrites.

==== Stage 2: Planetesimals form ====
Soon after the new minerals formed in Stage 1, they began to clump together, forming asteroids and planets. One of the most important new minerals was ice; the early Solar System had a "snow line" separating rocky planets and asteroids from ice-rich giant planets, trans-Neptunian objects, and comets. Heating from radionuclides melted the ice and the water reacted with olivine-rich rocks, forming phyllosilicates, oxides such as magnetite, sulfides such as pyrrhotite, the carbonates dolomite and calcite, and sulfates such as gypsum. Shock and heat from bombardment and eventual melting produced minerals such as ringwoodite, a major component of Earth's mantle.

Eventually, asteroids heated enough for partial melting to occur, producing melts rich in pyroxene and plagioclase (capable of producing basalt) and a variety of phosphates. Siderophile (metal-loving) and lithophile (silicate-loving) elements separated, leading to the formation of a core and crust, and incompatible elements were sequestered in the melts. The resulting minerals have been preserved in a type of stony meteorite, eucrite (quartz, potassium feldspar, titanite and zircon) and in iron-nickel meteorites (iron-nickel alloys such as kamacite and taenite; transition metal sulfides such as troilite; carbides and phosphides). An estimated 250 new minerals formed in this stage.

=== Crust and mantle reworking ===
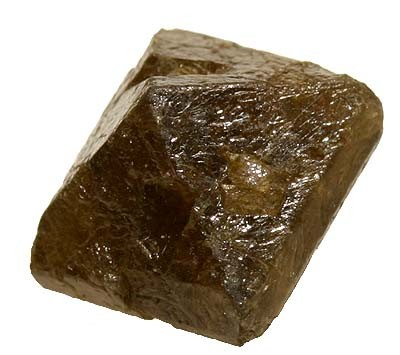
A zircon crystal

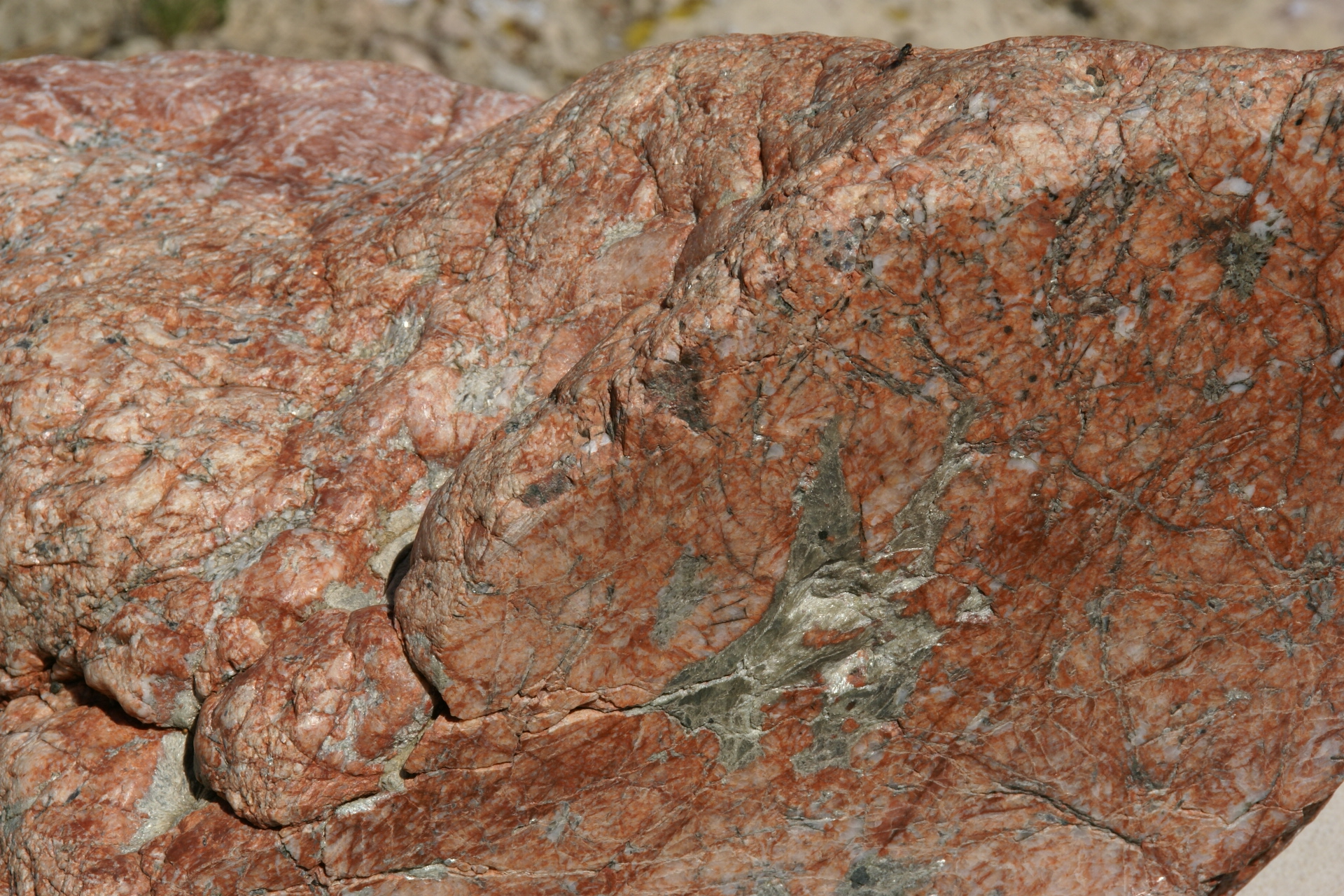
Pegmatite sample from the Grand Canyon

Schematic of a subduction zone

The second era in the history of mineral evolution began with the massive impact that formed the Moon. This melted most of the crust and mantle. Early mineralogy was determined by crystallization of igneous rocks and further bombardments. This phase was then replaced by extensive recycling of crust and mantle, so that at the end of this era there were about 1500 mineral species. However, few of the rocks survived from this period so the timing of many events remains uncertain.

==== Stage 3: Igneous processes ====
Stage 3 began with a crust made of mafic (high in iron and magnesium) and ultramafic rocks such as basalt. These rocks were repeatedly recycled by fractional melting, fractional crystallization and separation of magmas that refuse to mix. An example of such a process is Bowen's reaction series.

One of the few sources of direct information on mineralogy in this stage is mineral inclusions in zircon crystals, which date as far back as 4.4 Ga. Among the minerals in the inclusions are quartz, muscovite, biotite, potassium feldspar, albite, chlorite and hornblende.

In a volatile-poor body such as Mercury and the Moon, the above processes give rise to about 350 mineral species. Water and other volatiles, if present, increase the total. Earth was volatile-rich, with an atmosphere composed of N_{2}, CO_{2} and water, and an ocean that became steadily more saline. Volcanism, outgassing and hydration gave rise to hydroxides, hydrates, carbonates and evaporites. For Earth, where this stage coincides with the Hadean Eon, the total number of widely occurring minerals is estimated to be 420, with over 100 more that were rare. Mars probably reached this stage of mineral evolution.

==== Stage 4: Granitoids and pegmatite formation ====
Given sufficient heat, basalt was remelted to form granitoids, coarse-grained rocks similar to granite. Cycles of melting concentrated rare elements such as lithium, beryllium, boron, niobium, tantalum and uranium to the point where they could form 500 new minerals. Many of these are concentrated in exceptionally coarse-grained rocks called pegmatites that are typically found in dikes and veins near larger igneous masses. Venus may have achieved this level of evolution.

==== Stage 5: Plate tectonics ====
With the onset of plate tectonics, subduction carried crust and water down, leading to fluid-rock interactions and more concentration of rare elements. In particular, sulfide deposits were formed with 150 new sulfosalt minerals. Subduction also carried cooler rock into the mantle and exposed it to higher pressures, resulting in new phases that were later uplifted and exposed as metamorphic minerals such as kyanite and sillimanite.

=== Biologically mediated mineralogy ===
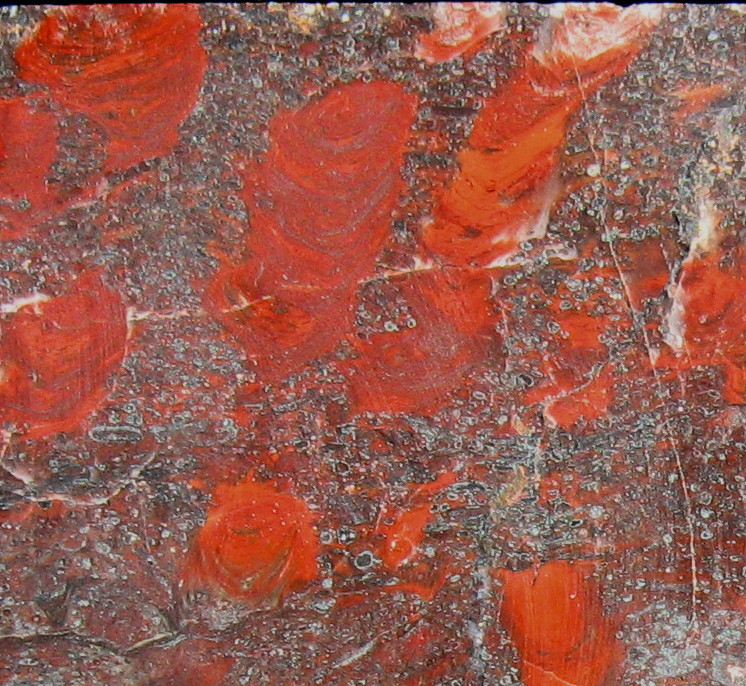
Stromatolite fossil in section of a 2.1 Ga banded iron formation

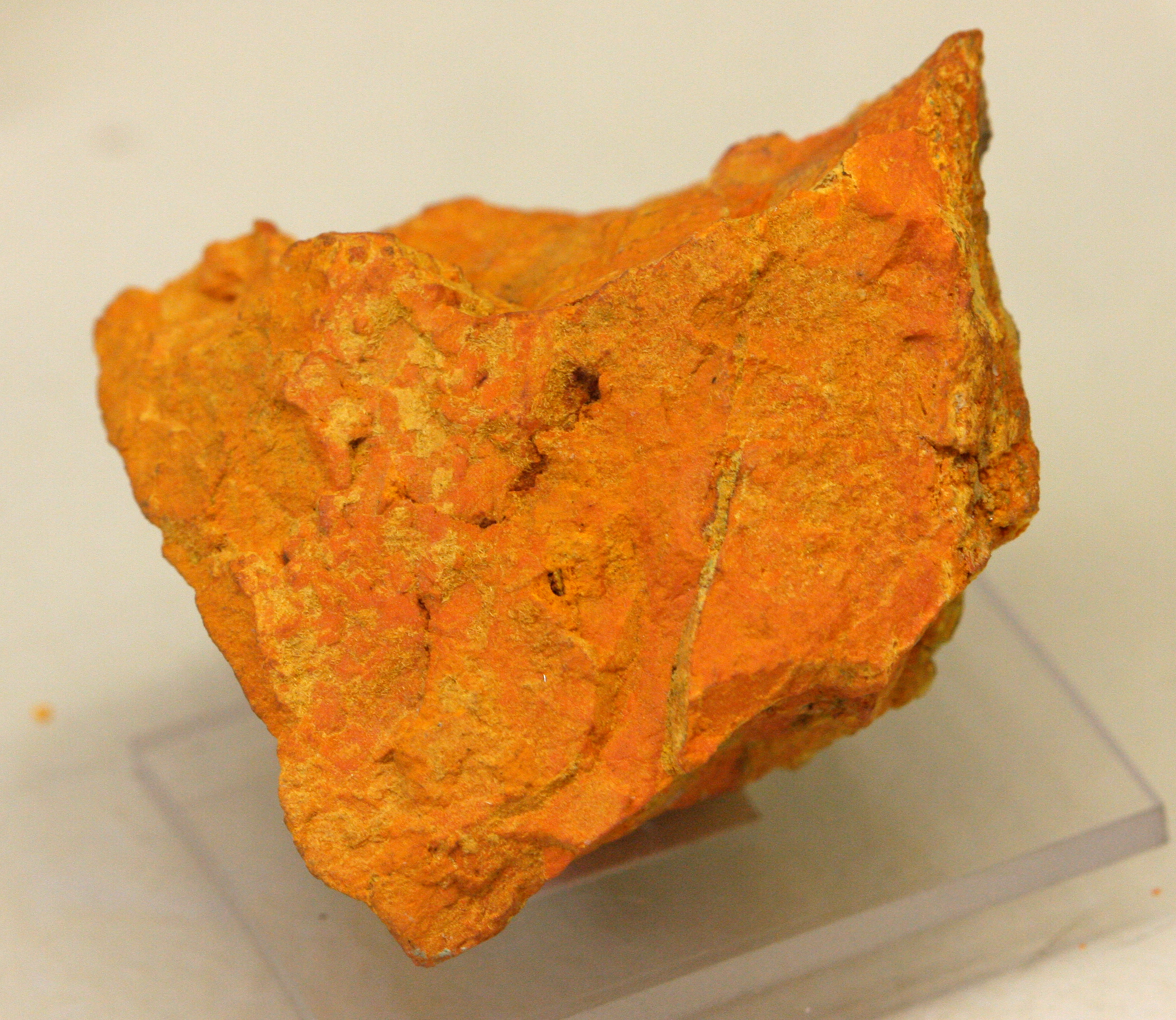
Curite, a lead uranium oxide mineral

The inorganic processes described in the previous section produced about 1500 mineral species. The remaining more than two-thirds of Earth's minerals are the result of the transformation of Earth by living organisms. The largest contribution was from the enormous increase in the oxygen content of the atmosphere, starting with the Great Oxygenation Event. Living organisms also started to produce skeletons and other forms of biomineralization. Minerals such as calcite, metal oxides and many clay minerals could be considered biosignatures, along with gems such as turquoise, azurite and malachite.

==== Stage 6: Biology in an anoxic world ====
Before about 2.45 Ga, there was very little oxygen in the atmosphere. Life may have played a role in the precipitation of massive carbonate layers near continental margins and in the deposition of banded iron formations, but there is no unambiguous evidence of the effect of life on minerals.

==== Stage 7: Great Oxygenation Event ====
Starting around 2.45 Ga and continuing to about 2.0 or 1.9 Ga, there was a dramatic rise in the oxygen content of the lower atmosphere, continents and oceans called the Great Oxygenation Event or Great Oxidation Event (GOE). Before the GOE, elements that can be in multiple oxidation states were restricted to the lowest state, and that limited the variety of minerals they could form. In older sediments, the minerals siderite (FeCO_{3}), uraninite (UO_{2}) and pyrite (FeS_{2}) are commonly found. These oxidize rapidly when exposed to an atmosphere with oxygen, yet this did not occur even after extensive weathering and transport.

When the concentration of oxygen molecules in the atmosphere reached 1% of the present level, the chemical reactions during weathering were much like they are today. Siderite and pyrite were replaced by the iron oxides magnetite and hematite; dissolved Fe^{2+} ions that had been carried out to sea were now deposited in extensive banded iron formations. However, this did not result in new iron minerals, just a change in their abundance. By contrast, oxidization of uraninite resulted in over 200 new species of uranyl minerals such as soddyite and weeksite, as well as mineral complexes such as gummite.

Other elements that have multiple oxidation states include copper (which occurs in 321 oxides and silicates), boron, vanadium, magnesium, selenium, tellurium, arsenic, antimony, bismuth, silver and mercury. In total, about 2500 new minerals formed.

==== Stage 8: Intermediate ocean ====
The next roughly billion years (1.85–0.85 Ga) are often referred to as the "Boring Billion" because little seemed to happen. The more oxidized layer of ocean water near the surface slowly deepened at the expense of the anoxic depths, but there did not seem to be any dramatic change in climate, biology or mineralogy. However, some of this perception may be due to poor preservation of rocks from that time span. Many of the world's most valuable reserves of lead, zinc and silver, are found in rocks from this time, as well as rich sources of beryllium, boron and uranium minerals. This interval also saw the formation of the supercontinent Columbia, its breakup, and the formation of Rodinia. In some quantitative studies of beryllium, boron and mercury minerals, there are no new minerals during the Great Oxidation Event, but a pulse of innovation during the assembly of Columbia. The reasons for this are not clear, although it may have had something to do with the release of mineralizing fluids during mountain building.

==== Stage 9: Snowball Earth ====
Between 1.0 and 0.542 Ga, the Earth experienced at least two "Snowball Earth" events in which much (possibly all) of the surface was covered by ice (making it the dominant surface mineral). Associated with the ice were cap carbonates, thick layers of limestone or dolomite, with aragonite fans. Clay minerals were also produced in abundance, and volcanoes managed to pierce through the ice and add to the stock of minerals.

==== Stage 10: Phanerozoic era and biomineralization ====
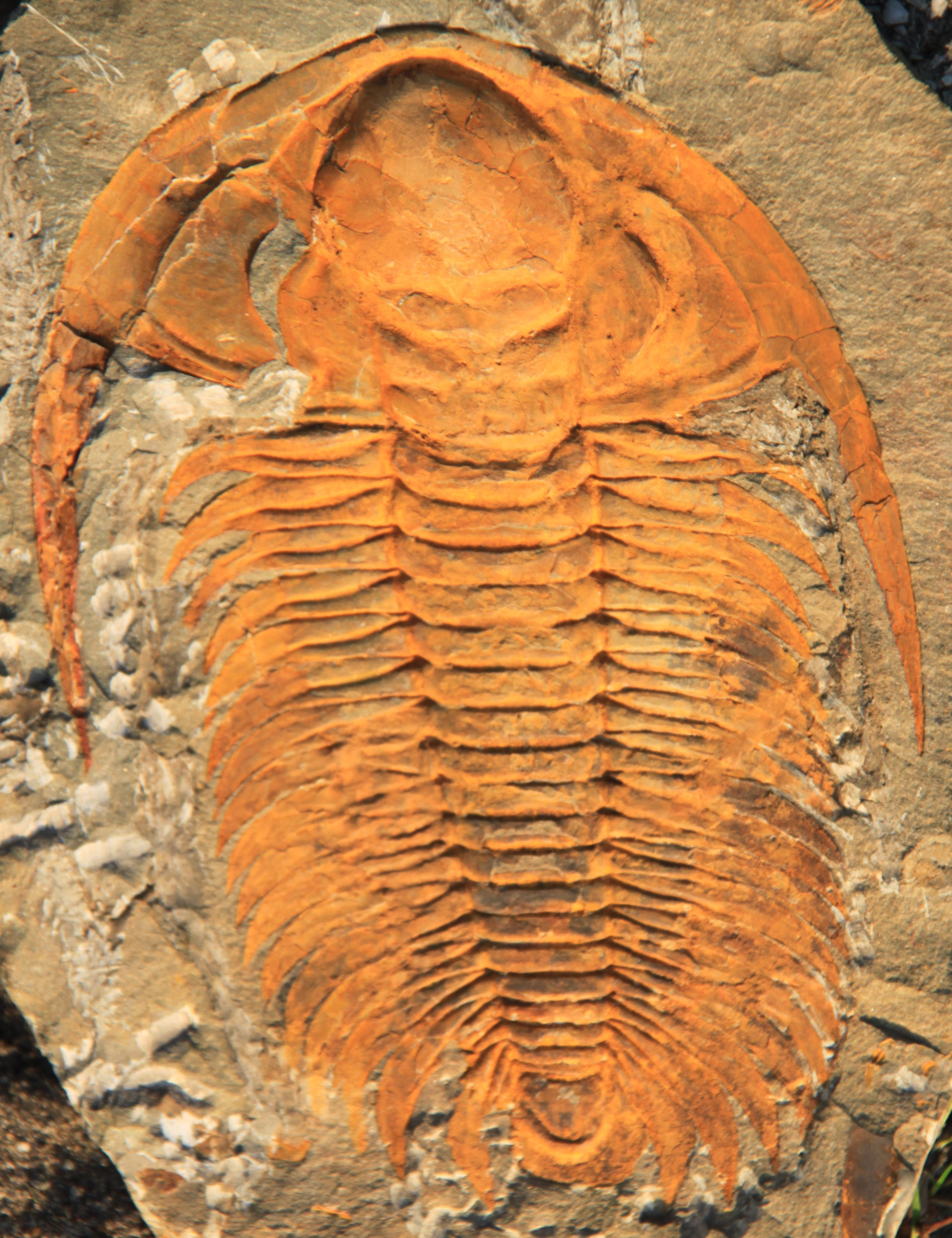
Late Cambrian trilobite fossil

The last stage coincides with the Phanerozoic era, in which biomineralization, the creation of minerals by living organisms, became widespread. Although some biominerals can be found in earlier records, it was during the Cambrian explosion that most of the known skeletal forms developed, and the major skeletal minerals (calcite, aragonite, apatite and opal). Most of these are carbonates, but some are phosphates or calcite. In all, over 64 mineral phases have been identified in living organisms, including metal sulfides, oxides, hydroxides and silicates; over two dozen have been found in the human body.

Before the Phanerozoic, land was mostly barren rock, but plants began to populate it in the Silurian Period. This led to an order-of-magnitude increase in the production of clay minerals. In the oceans, plankton transported calcium carbonate from shallow waters to the deep ocean, inhibiting the production of cap carbonates and making future snowball Earth events less likely. Microbes also became involved in the geochemical cycles of most elements, making them biogeochemical cycles. The mineralogical novelties included organic minerals that have been found in carbon-rich remnants of life such as coal and black shales.

=== Anthropocene ===
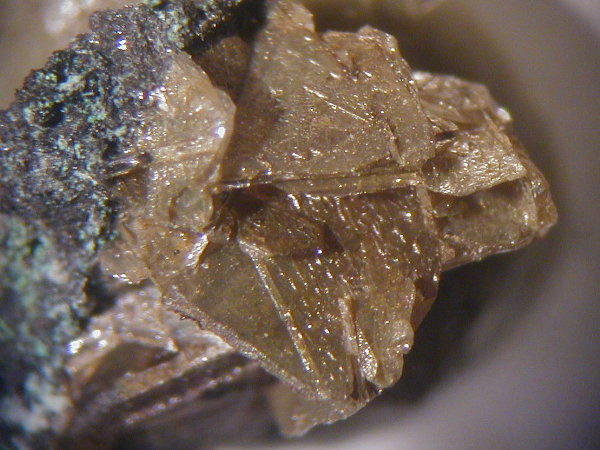
The mineral abhurite forms when tin artifacts corrode in sea water, and is found near some shipwrecks.

Strictly speaking, purely biogenic minerals are not recognized by the International Mineralogical Association (IMA) unless geological processes are also involved. Purely biological products such as the shells of marine organisms are not accepted. Also explicitly excluded are anthropogenic compounds. However, humans have had such an impact on the surface of the planet that geologists are considering the introduction of a new geological epoch, the Anthropocene, to reflect these changes.

In 2015, Zalasiewicz and co-authors proposed that the definition of minerals be extended to include human-minerals and that their production constitutes an 11th stage of mineral evolution. Subsequently, Hazen and co-authors catalogued 208 minerals that are officially recognized by the IMA but are primarily or exclusively the result of human activities. Most of these have formed in association with mining. In addition, some were created when metal artefacts sank and interacted with the seafloor. A few would probably not be officially recognized today but are allowed to remain in the catalog; these include two (niobocarbide and tantalcarbide) that may have been a hoax.

Hazen and co-authors identified three ways that humans have had a large impact on the distribution and diversity of minerals. The first is through manufacture. A long list of synthetic crystals have mineral equivalents, including synthetic gems, ceramics, brick, cement and batteries. Many more have no mineral equivalent; over 180,000 inorganic crystalline compounds are listed in the Inorganic Crystal Structure Database. For mining or building of infrastructure, humans have redistributed rocks, sediments and minerals on a scale rivalling that of glaciation, and valuable minerals have been redistributed and juxtaposed in ways that would not occur naturally.

== Origin of life ==
Over two-thirds of mineral species owe their existence to life, but life may also owe its existence to minerals. They may have been needed as templates to bring organic molecules together; as catalysts for chemical reactions; and as metabolites. Two prominent theories for the origin of life involve clays and transition metal sulfides. Another theory argues that calcium-borate minerals such as colemanite and borate, and possibly also molybdate, may have been needed for the first ribonucleic acid (RNA) to form. Other theories require less common minerals such as mackinawite or greigite. A catalog of the minerals that were formed during the Hadean Eon includes clay minerals and iron and nickel sulfides, including mackinawite and greigite; but borates and molybdates were unlikely.

Minerals may also have been necessary to the survival of early life. For example, quartz is more transparent than other minerals in sandstones. Before life developed pigments to protect it from damaging ultraviolet rays, a thin layer of quartz could shield it while allowing enough light through for photosynthesis. Phosphate minerals may also have been important to early life. Phosphorus is one of the essential elements in molecules such as adenosine triphosphate (ATP), an energy carrier found in all living cells; RNA and DNA; and cell membranes. Most of Earth's phosphorus is in the core and mantle. The most likely mechanism for making it available to life would be the creation of phosphates such as apatite through fractionation, followed by weathering to release the phosphorus. This may have required plate tectonics.

== Further research ==
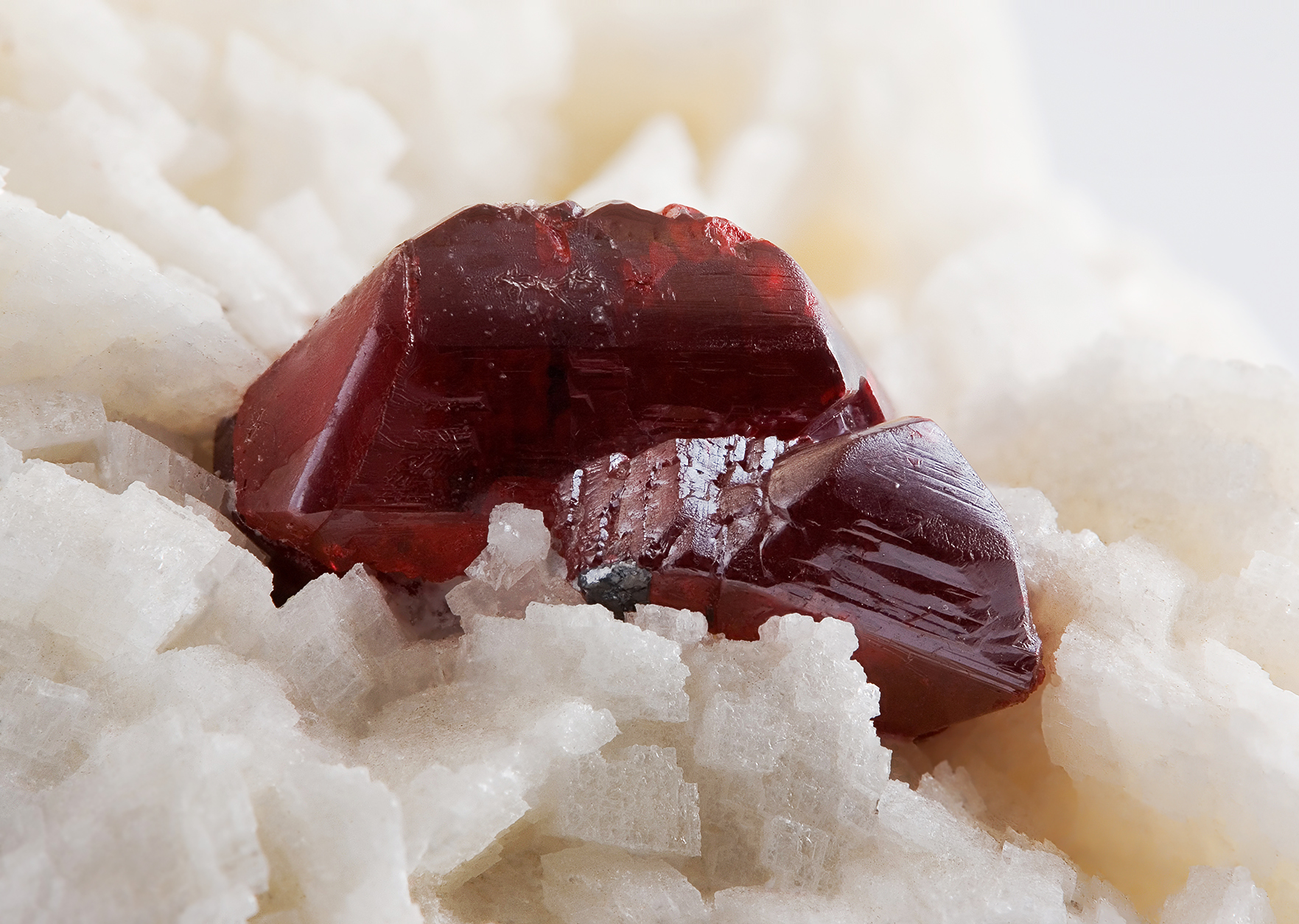
Cinnabar (red) on dolomite

Since the original paper on mineral evolution, there have been several studies of minerals of specific elements, including uranium, thorium, mercury, carbon, beryllium, and the clay minerals. These reveal information about different processes; for example, uranium and thorium are heat producers while uranium and carbon indicate oxidation state. The records reveal episodic bursts of new minerals such as those during the Boring Billion, as well as long periods where no new minerals appeared. For example, after a jump in diversity during the assembly of Columbia, there were no new mercury minerals between 1.8 Ga and 600 million years ago. This remarkably long hiatus is attributed to a sulfide-rich ocean, which led to rapid deposition of the mineral cinnabar.

Most of the mineral evolution papers have looked at the first appearance of minerals, but one can also look at the age distribution of a given mineral. Millions of zircon crystals have been dated, and the age distributions are nearly independent of where the crystals are found (e.g., igneous rocks, sedimentary or metasedimentary rocks or modern river sands). They have highs and lows that are linked with the supercontinent cycle, although it is not clear whether this is due to changes in subduction activity or preservation.

Other studies have looked at time variations of mineral properties such as isotope ratios, chemical compositions, and relative abundances of minerals, although not under the rubric of "mineral evolution".

== History ==
For most of its history, mineralogy had no historical component. It was concerned with classifying minerals according to their chemical and physical properties (such as the chemical formula and crystal structure) and defining conditions for stability of a mineral or group of minerals. However, there were exceptions where publications looked at the distribution of ages of minerals or of ores. In 1960, Russell Gordon Gastil found cycles in the distribution of mineral dates. Charles Meyer, finding that the ores of some elements are distributed over a wider time span than others, attributed the difference to the effects of tectonics and biomass on the surface chemistry, particularly free oxygen and carbon. In 1979, A. G. Zhabin introduced the concept of stages of mineral evolution in the Russian-language journal Doklady Akademii Nauk and in 1982, N. P. Yushkin noted the increasing complexity of minerals over time near the surface of the Earth. Then, in 2008, Hazen and colleagues introduced a much broader and more detailed vision of mineral evolution. This was followed by a series of quantitative explorations of the evolution of various mineral groups. These led in 2015 to the concept of mineral ecology, the study of distributions of minerals in space and time.

In April 2017, the Natural History Museum in Vienna opened a new permanent exhibit on mineral evolution.
