= The Edge of the Unknown =

1996 popular science book by James Trefil

The Edge of the Unknown: 101 Things You Don't Know about Science and No One Else Does Either
- Author: James Trefil
- Language: English
- Genre: Non-fiction
- Publication date: 1996
- Pages: 355

The Edge of the Unknown: 101 Things You Don't Know about Science and No One Else Does Either is a popular science book written by American physicist James Trefil. Published in 1996, the 355-page work is Trefil's 10th publication.

== Reception ==
According to a review on the Publishers Weekly website, "if readers overlook the fatuous subtitle; (the book provides) a competent and sometimes fascinating tour of the frontiers of scientific inquiry, such that the readers will appreciate being able to satisfy their curiosity about the likelihood of time travel, the causes of cancer and the future of computers with this user-friendly resource ...(readers) will come away sharing the author's respect and awe for achievements of those who scan the geometric surfaces of viruses and construct molecular remedies for deadly diseases, probe chaotic system of the earth's atmosphere and even try to save us from our genetically encoded craving for fat."

According to Bruce Slutsky, "the book's major shortcoming is that treatment of each issue is very cursory (only three-page summations) with no historical context or extended discussion on the philosophical consequences of scientific discoveries. Trefil also makes his readers feel disappointed by failing to provide bibliographies of references that consider these issues in more detail of questionable value to public libraries."
