= A Scientist at the Seashore =

1984 book by James Trefil

- Author: James Trefil
- Publication date: 1984

A Scientist at the Seashore is a 1984 book written by American physicist James Trefil. It is Trefil's fourth book.

== Overview ==
A noted physicist and popular science writer heads for the beach to answer common and uncommon questions about the ocean: why the sea is salty, how bubbles form on the water's surface, where waves come from, and other curiosities of the marine world.

== Reviews ==
- Mercury, 15 (3): 92, June 1986, Bibcode:1986Mercu..15R..92T
- Chu, Ellen W. (February 24, 1985), "All up and down the whole creation", The New York Times
- Hannibal, Joseph (January 1985), Library Journal, vol. 110 (1 ed.), p. 93
- March, Robert H. (April 1988), Physics Today, 41 (4): 88–90, Bibcode:1988PhT....41d..88T, doi:10.1063/1.2811392
- Mattingly, Rosanna L. (May 1986), Journal of College Science Teaching, 15 (6): 564, JSTOR 42988852
