= The Origin and Nature of Life on Earth: The Emergence of the Fourth Geosphere =

Book in abiogenesis and geochemistry

- Author: Eric Smith and Harold J. Morowitz
- Language: English
- Subject: Abiogenesis, Geochemistry
- Publisher: Cambridge University Press
- Publication date: June, 2016
- Publication place: United States
- Media type: Print (Hardcover)
- Pages: 677
- ISBN: 9781316348772
- OCLC: 930508566
- Dewey Decimal: 570
- LC Class: QH325

The Origin and Nature of Life on Earth: The Emergence of the Fourth Geosphere (2016) is a book by Eric Smith and biophysicist Harold J. Morowitz which provides an introduction to origins of life research via a review of perspectives from a variety of fields active in this research area, including geochemistry, biochemistry, ecology, and microbiology. The book seeks to advance a novel theory by which the emergence of life can be conceptualized as a series of phase transitions, and in so doing relies on ideas from statistical mechanics and non-equilibrium thermodynamics. The book also argues for the primacy of metabolism, suggesting that the problem is not so much when and how life first appeared on Earth, but rather how a variety of non-biological chemical reactions came to be integrated into the earliest biotic metabolism. Given the nature of life's emergence through a series of phase transitions, and the abiotic origins of the various chemical processes constituting metabolism, the authors contend that the emergence of the biosphere, and its underlying biochemistry, is itself a planetary-scale process that is continuous with geochemistry and thus the biosphere itself should be considered the "fourth Geosphere," as the title suggests.
