= Space Atlas: Mapping the Universe and Beyond =

Book by James Trefil

- First edition cover
- Author: James Trefil
- Language: English
- Subject: Astronomy
- Genre: Non-fiction
- Publisher: National Geographic
- Publication date: 2012
- Publication place: United States

Space Atlas: Mapping the Universe and Beyond is a National Geographic book written by American physicist James S. Trefil, Robinson Professor of Physics at George Mason University in 2012. It is subdivided into three parts, including photography, star charts, and general information surrounding the Solar System, the Milky Way galaxy, and the universe.

The book also mentions scientists whose discoveries expanded human knowledge of the universe, such as Nicolaus Copernicus (who contrived the first serious heliocentric model of the Solar System) and Jocelyn Bell Burnell (who discovered signals of pulsars).

In 2018, a second edition of Space Atlas was published. Similar to the 2012 edition, this edition includes a foreword by the former NASA astronaut Buzz Aldrin to commemorate the 50th anniversary of his moon landing in Apollo 11.
