= Hazenite =

Phosphate mineral

General
- Category: Phosphate mineral Struvite group
- Formula: KNaMg_{2}(PO_{4})_{2} · 14 H_{2}O
- IMA symbol: Hz
- Strunz classification: 8.CH.40
- Dana classification: 40.01.01.03
- Crystal system: Orthorhombic
- Crystal class: Dipyramidal (mmm); H–M Symbol: (2/m 2/m 2/m)
- Space group: Pmnb
- Unit cell: a = 6.9349, b = 25.1737 c = 11.2189 [Å]; Z = 4

Identification
- Formula mass: 276.331 g/mol
- Color: Colorless
- Crystal habit: Radiating elongated tabular or prismatic clusters or single bladed tabular crystals
- Cleavage: {001} Good
- Tenacity: Brittle
- Mohs scale hardness: 2 – 2.5
- Luster: Vitreous
- Streak: White
- Diaphaneity: Transparent
- Specific gravity: 1.91
- Optical properties: Biaxial (+)
- Refractive index: n_{α} =1.494(1), n_{β} = 1.498(1), n_{γ} = 1.503(1)
- 2V angle: 41°
- Dispersion: Strong r < v
- Solubility: In water

Hazenite is a hydrous phosphate mineral with chemical formula of KNaMg_{2}(PO_{4})_{2} · 14 H_{2}O, therefore a hydrous alkali magnesium phosphate. It is a member of the struvite group.

It was first described for an occurrence adjacent to Mono Lake, California, and named after Robert M. Hazen of the Carnegie Institute. It was approved as a new mineral on February 28, 2008 by the Commission on New Minerals of the International Mineralogical Association.

It occurs as crystal clusters associated with decomposed cyanobacteria remnants on calcite or aragonite. It is precipitated by microbes when the lake has been dry for so long that phosphorus levels build up, poisoning the microbes. They dispose of the excess phosphorus by excreting hazenite crystals. The crystals disappear when it rains or the lake level rises.
