= James Trefil =

American physicist (b. 1938)

James Stanley Trefil
- Born: September 10, 1938 (age 88); Chicago, Illinois
- Education: University of Illinois, Oxford University, Stanford University
- Known for: Popular science books
- Spouses: Elinor Pletka (m. 1960; div. 1972) Jeanne Waples (m. 1973; div. 1997) Kim Gareiss (m. 1999, divorced) Wanda O'Brien (m. 2005)
- Children: 5
- Awards: 2000 Andrew Gemant Award, 2007 Science Writing Award

James Stanley Trefil (born September 10, 1938) is an American physicist (Ph.D. in physics at Stanford University in 1966) and author of nearly fifty books. Much of his published work focuses on science for the general audience. He has served as Professor of Physics at the University of Virginia and, since 1988, as Robinson Professor of Physics at George Mason University. Among his books is Are We Unique?, an argument for human uniqueness in which he questions the comparisons between human intelligence and artificial intelligence. Trefil has also given presentations to judges and public officials about the intersections between science and the law.

== Biography ==
Trefil was born on 10 September 1938 in Chicago, Illinois. He was the son of Stanley James Trefil (a personnel manager) and Sylvia (Mestek) Trefil (a social worker).

He obtained his Bachelor of Science at the University of Illinois in 1960, and later that year matriculated at Merton College, Oxford, where he took a second class degree in physics in 1962. He read his Master of Arts at Oxford University (England) in 1962 where he studied as a Marshall Scholar. While at Oxford, Trefil was a member of the Oxford University men's basketball team. In 1964 he obtained his Master of Science at Stanford University and in 1966 his PhD (Physics) at Stanford University. His areas of research have included particle physics, fluid mechanics, medical physics and the earth sciences.

Trefil is a physicist, author, public speaker, radio broadcaster, commentator, and educator. He was appointed a fellow of the Stanford Linear Accelerator Center, Stanford, California in 1966. He served as a fellow of the European Center for Nuclear Research, Geneva, Switzerland from 1966 to 1967. Trefil was a fellow of the Laboratory for Nuclear Science at the Massachusetts Institute of Technology, Cambridge from 1967 to 1968.

He was appointed assistant professor of physics at the University of Illinois, Urbana from 1968 to 1970. From 1970 to 1975 he was a fellow of the Center for Advanced Studies and an associate professor at the University of Virginia, Charlottesville. He was appointed professor of physics at University of Virginia from 1975 to 1988.

Since 1988, he has held the position of Clarence J. Robinson Professor of Physics at George Mason University, Fairfax, Virginia. Trefil was the Phi Beta Kappa visiting scholar from 2003 to 2004. He has appeared on National Public Radio (NPR) as a science advisor and commentator. Trefil has been a science consultant to the Smithsonian Magazine, a technical consultant to the American Heritage Dictionary and a consultant to the Adler Planetarium.

== Affiliations ==
Trefil is a fellow of the American Physical Society, the World Economic Forum, and the American Association for the Advancement of Science.

== Awards ==
Some awards received by Trefil are:

- 2000 Andrew Gemant Award for linking physics to the arts and humanities
- 2007 Science Writing Award (American Institute of Physics) for his article Where is the universe heading? in Astronomy Magazine.

He has also been recognised by Who's Who for his more than 50 years of contributions to the field of physics.

== Personal life ==
In 2005, Trefil married Wanda O'Brien. His first three marriages ended in divorce: Elinor Pletka (m. 1960 – d. 1972), Jeanne Waples (m. 1973 – d. 1997), Kim Gareiss (m. 1999). Trefil has five children, James Karel, Stefan, Dominique, Flora, and Thomas.

== Publications ==
Some of the books written by James Trefil are:

- Introduction to the Physics of Fluids and Solids (1975)
- From Atoms to Quarks (1980)
- The Unexpected Vista: A Physicist's View of Nature (1983)
- The Moment of Creation (1983)
- A Scientist at the Seashore (1984)
- Meditations at 10,000 Feet (1986)
- The Dark Side of the Universe (1989)
- Reading the Mind of God: In Search of the Principle of Universality (1989)
- 1,001 Things Everyone Should Know About Science (1992)
- A Scientist in the City (1994)
- From Atoms to Quarks (1994)
- The Edge of the Unknown: 101 Things You Don't Know about Science and No One Else Does Either (1996) ISBN 0-395-72862-2
- Are We Unique: A Scientist Explores the Complexity of the Human Brain (1997) ISBN 0-471-24946-7
- Other Worlds: The Solar System and Beyond? (1999)
- Good Seeing: A Century of Science at the Carnegie Institution of Washington, 1902-2002 (2001)
- The Laws of Nature (2002)
- The Nature of Science: An A-Z Guide to the Laws and Principles Governing Our Universe (2003) ISBN 0-618-31938-7
- Human Nature: A Blueprint for Managing the Earth – By People, for People (2004) ISBN 0-8050-7248-9
- A Scientist at the Seashore (2005)
- Why Science? (2007)
- Introduction to the Physics of Fluids and Solids (2010)
- Space Atlas: Mapping the Universe and Beyond (2012)
- Sharks Have No Bones: 1001 Things Everyone Should Know About Science
- The Dictionary of Cultural Literacy
- The Dictionary of Cultural Literacy, 2nd Edition, Revised & Updated
- The New Dictionary of Cultural Literacy: What Every American Needs to Know
- The Nature of Science: An A-Z Guide to the Laws and Principles Governing Our Universe

Books that James Trefil co-authored:

- (with Harold Morowitz, co-author) The Facts of Life: science and the abortion controversy (1992)
- (with Robert Hazen, co-author) Science Matters: Achieving Scientific Literacy (1991)
- (with Robert Hazen, co-author) The Sciences: An Integrated Approach (1995)
- (with Margaret Hindle Hazen, co-author) Good Seeing: A Century of Science at the Carnegie Institution of Washington, 1902-2002
- (with Michael Summers, co-author) Exoplanets: Diamond Worlds, Super Earths, Pulsar Planets, and the Search for Life Beyond Our Solar System (2017)
- (with Michael Summers, co-author) Imagined Life: A Speculative Scientific Journey among the Exoplanets in Search of Intelligent Aliens, Ice Creatures, and Supergravity Animals (2019)

Trefil also edited The Encyclopedia of Science and Technology (2002).

Trefil has written on several controversial subjects including abortion and Intelligent Design, the latter of which he has been very critical.

In his 1992 book, The Facts of Life, Trefil wrote:

The question of whether abortion should or should not be permitted, and under what circumstances, is among the most difficult and sometimes anguished decisions for contemporary men and women... And as emotions run high, it is helpful to step back from the highly charged arena to reconsider the underlying scientific facts about human development ... [and examine the] ... consensus of scientific opinion on when humanness begins.

—

In 2005, Trefil wrote the following about intelligent design:

Since the Scopes trial in 1925, the battle between scientists who want to teach mainstream biology in American public schools, and creationists who want to promulgate a more religious view, has gone through several cycles. In McLean v. Arkansas Board of Education in 1982, a federal court ruled that the introduction of creationism into public-school curricula constituted the establishment of religion, and hence was expressly forbidden by the First Amendment. That decision dealt a serious blow to old-line creationism and its close cousin, so-called creation science. But another variant of creationism, so-called intelligent design, has cropped up. At least 19 states are now debating its use in public education, and President Bush commented in August that he thought both evolution and intelligent design "ought to be properly taught." Many people fail to understand the subtle but important differences between the new and old forms of creationism, and the different debates those approaches engender.

—
