= Harold J. Morowitz =

American biophysicist (1927–2016)

- Born: December 4, 1927; Poughkeepsie, New York, U.S.
- Died: March 22, 2016 (aged 88)
- Education: Yale University
- Scientific career
- Fields: Biophysics
- Workplaces: George Mason University; Pierson College; Yale University

Harold Joseph Morowitz (December 4, 1927 – March 22, 2016) was an American biophysicist who studied the application of thermodynamics to living systems. Author of numerous books and articles, his work includes technical monographs as well as essays. He primarily studied the origin of life, this being his research interest for more than fifty years. He was the Robinson Professor of Biology and Natural Philosophy at George Mason University after a long career at Yale.

== Life and career ==
Morowitz was born in Poughkeepsie, New York. He received a B.S. in physics and philosophy in 1947, an M.S. in physics in 1950, and a Ph.D. in biophysics in 1951, all from Yale University. Morowitz was a professor in the department of molecular biophysics and biochemistry at Yale from 1955 to 1987, also serving as the Master of Pierson College from 1981 to 1986. He spent the rest of his career on the faculty at George Mason University, which he joined in 1988 as Clarence Robinson Professor of biology and natural philosophy. He served as the founding director of the Krasnow Institute for Advanced Study at George Mason from 1993 to 1998. Morowitz was closely associated with the Santa Fe Institute since 1987, where he was Chairman Emeritus of the Science Board. He also served as the founding editor of the journal Complexity. In the 1990s he contributed a monthly column on science and society to Hospital Practice.

Morowitz was a longtime consultant for NASA, and served on the committees that planned the quarantine procedures for Apollo 11 and the biology experiments the Viking probe carried to the surface of Mars. He was a member of the science advisory committee for Biosphere 2 in Oracle, Arizona, which, at 3.14 acres, is the largest enclosed ecosystem ever built.

Some leading biophysicists have suggested that Morowitz may have discovered a "fourth law of thermodynamics" when, in 1968, he found that, "in steady state systems, the flow of energy through the system from a source to a sink will lead to at least one cycle in the system." Eric D. Schneider, for example, says, "Morowitz's cycling theorem is the best candidate for a fourth law of thermodynamics."

== The origin of life ==
Morowitz's book Energy Flow in Biology laid out his central thesis that "the energy that flows through a system acts to organize that system," an insight later quoted on the inside front cover of The Last Whole Earth Catalog. He was a vigorous proponent of the view that life on earth emerged deterministically from the laws of chemistry and physics, and so believed it highly probable that life exists widely in the universe. The origin of life being a very wide subject of study, his scientific work encompasses, more specifically, several related subjects such as: the origin of the chemiosmotic mechanism, the prebiotic synthesis of primitive cell membranes, the characteristics of a ‘minimal cell’ (including the minimal genome), and the origin and evolution of protometabolic networks (in a submarine, hydrothermal context).

In 1981, he testified at "McLean v. Arkansas" (nicknamed "Scopes II") that creationism has no scientific basis and so should not be taught as science in public schools.

His work is sometimes associated with the Gard model of evolutionary biology

=== Testimony in McLean v. Arkansas trial ===
The McLean v Arkansas trial, held in the Federal District Court in Little Rock, Arkansas, dealt with “Balanced Treatment of Creation Science and Evolution Science in the Public Schools” and was of considerable interest at the time. Morowitz described his testimony on this occasion in an essay “Tell it to the Judge” published in a somewhat whimsical collection of essays entitled “Mayonnaise and the Origin of Life”. Morowitz’s testimony was related to the aspect of the case dealing with abiogenesis, “the emergence of life from nonlife.” In support of creationism, the argument had been made that the second law of thermodynamics precludes that abiogenesis could have occurred by a natural process; thus there was a requirement for supernatural events. According to the second law, isolated systems move towards the maximum degree of molecular disorder (life on earth is an ordered system). Also in this case, “isolated system” means the absence of flows of both energy and matter into and out of the system.

Much of Morowitz’s scientific career had been devoted to understanding the thermodynamic foundations of biological organization. When he was called to give his expert testimony he noted that Ludwig Boltzmann, the distinguished Austrian physicist had in 1886 resolved the confusion concerning the applicability of the second law of thermodynamics to living systems. Boltzmann had made clear that the Earth, rather than being an isolated system, is an open system undergoing a flow of solar energy from the sun. Thus the surface of the Earth is not limited by a law that is restricted to isolated entities. Morowitz also pointed out that newer developments in the field of irreversible thermodynamics (see Irreversible Process and Lars Onsager), indicated that systems become ordered under a flow of energy. In his testimony Morowitz concluded that the existence of life involves no contradictions to the laws of physics.

== Bibliography ==
=== Selected scientific works ===
- Morowitz, H.J. (1953), “The Information Content of Living Systems”, Physical Review, 91, No. 2, pp. 492–493.
- Morowitz, Harold J. and Spaulding, Marie (1958). “A statistical analysis of the order of certain amino acids in the protein of Escherichia coli”, Biochimica et Biophysica Acta, Volume 29, Issue 3 (September 1958), pp. 514–521. doi: 10.1016/0006-3002(58)90007-6
- Morowitz, Harold (1966). “The Minimum Size of Cells”, pp. 446–477. In: Wolstenholme, G. E. W. and O'Connor, Maeve (Eds.), Ciba Foundation Symposium: Principles of Biomolecular Organization, Ciba Foundation, 1966. doi: 10.1002/9780470719442.ch16
- Morowitz, Harold J. (1967). “Biological Self-Replicating Systems”, pp. 35–59. In: Snell, Fred M. (Ed.) Progress in Theoretical Biology, Volume 1, Academic Press, New York, 1967.
- Morowitz, Harold J. (1969). “A mechanism for the amplification of fluctuations in racemic mixtures”, Journal of Theoretical Biology, Vol. 25, Issue 3 (December 1969), pp. 491–494. doi: 10.1016/S0022-5193(69)80035-4
- Folsome, C. E. and Morowitz, H. J. (1969). “Prebiological membranes: Synthesis and properties”, Space Life Sciences, Vol. 1, Issue 4 (March 1969), pp. 538–544. doi: 10.1007/BF00924244
- Morowitz, Harold J. (1977). “Perspectives on Thermodynamics and the Origin of Life”, Advances in Biological and Medical Physics, Vol. 16, pp. 151–163. doi: 10.1016/B978-0-12-005216-5.50013-X
- Morowitz, Harold J. (1981). “Phase separation, charge separation and biogenesis”, Biosystems, Vol. 14, Issue 1, pp. 41–47. doi: 10.1016/0303-2647(81)90020-4
- Smith, Temple F. and Morowitz, Harold J. (1982). “Between history and physics”, Journal of Molecular Evolution, Vol. 18, Issue 4 (July 1982), pp. 265–282. doi: 10.1007/BF01734104
- Morowitz, H. J. (1984). “The completeness of molecular biology”, Israel Journal of Medical Sciences, Vol. 20, Issue 9 (September 1984), pp. 750–753.
- Morowitz, Harold J. (1987). “A Hardware View of Biological Organization”, pp. 53–64. In: Yates, F. Eugene, Garfinkel, Alan, Walter, Donald O. and Yates, Gregory B. (Eds.), Self-Organizing Systems: The Emergence of Order. Springer, 1987. doi: 10.1007/978-1-4613-0883-6_4
- Morowitz, Harold J., Heinz, Bettina and Deamer, David W. (1988). “The chemical logic of a minimum protocell”, Origins of Life and Evolution of the Biosphere, Vol. 18, Issue 3 (September 1988), pp. 281–87. doi: 10.1007/BF01804674
- MacElroy, R.D., Morowitz, H., and Pohorille, A. (1989). “Ion transport mechanisms and prebiotic membranes”, Origins of Life and Evolution of the Biosphere, Vol. 19, Issues 3-5 (May 1989), pp. 295–296. doi: 10.1007/BF02388856
- Morowitz, Harold. J. (1994). “Artificial biochemistry, life before enzymes”, pp. 381–388. In: Langton, Christopher G. (Ed.), Artificial Life III: Proceedings of the Workshop on Artificial Life, Held June 1992 in Santa Fe, New Mexico. Reading, Mass: Addison-Wesley, 1994.
- Morowitz, Harold, Peterson, Eta and Chang, Sherwood (1995). “The synthesis of glutamic acid in the absence of enzymes: Implications for biogenesis”, Origins of Life and Evolution of the Biosphere, Vol. 25, Issue 4 (August 1995), pp. 395–399. doi: 10.1007/BF01581777
- Morowitz, Harold J. “The Secret of Life”, Hospital Practice, Vol. 30, Issue 7 (July 1995), pp. 19–20. doi: 10.1080/21548331.1995.11443220
- Morowitz, Harold J. (1999). “A theory of biochemical organization, metabolic pathways, and evolution”, Complexity, Vol. 4, Issue 6 (July/August 1999), pp. 39–53. doi: 10.1002/(SICI)1099-0526(199907/08)4:6<39::AID-CPLX8>3.0.CO;2-2
- Morowitz, Harold J., Kostelnik, Jennifer D., Yang, Jeremy, and Cody, George D. (2000). “The origin of intermediary metabolism”, Proceedings of the National Academy of Sciences of the United States of America, Vol. 97, Issue 14 (June 20, 2000), pp. 7704–7708. doi: 10.1073/pnas.110153997
- Cody, G.D., Boctor, N.Z., Hazen, R.M., Brandes, J.A., Morowitz, Harold J., Yoder Jr, H.S. (2001).“Geochemical roots of autotrophic carbon fixation: hydrothermal experiments in the system citric acid, H2O-(±FeS)−(±NiS)”, Geochimica et Cosmochimica Acta, Vol. 65, Issue 20 (15 October 2001), pp. 3557–3576. doi: 10.1016/S0016-7037(01)00674-3
- Morowitz, Harold (2002). “Phenetics, a born again science”, Complexity, Vol. 8, Issue 1 (September/October 2002), pp. 12–13. doi: 10.1002/cplx.10058
- Morowitz, Harold (2003). “How many genes does an organism need?”, Complexity, Vol. 9, Issue 2 (November/December 2003), pp. 11–12. doi: 10.1002/cplx.20016
- Smith, Eric and Morowitz, Harold J. (2004). “Universality in intermediary metabolism”, Proceedings of the National Academy of Sciences of the United States of America, Vol. 101, Issue 36 (August 30, 2004), pp. 13168–13173. doi: 10.1073/pnas.0404922101
- Morowitz, Harold J., Srinivasan, Vijayasarathy, and Smith, Eric (2004). “A Paradigm Shift in Biochemistry”, Journal of the Washington Academy of Sciences, Vol. 90, No. 3 (Autumn 2004), pp. 58–66. JSTOR: 24531013
- Smith, D. Eric and Morowitz, Harold J. (2004). “Searching for the Laws of Life”, SFI bulletin, winter 2004, pp. 16–23.
- Copley, Shelley D., Smith, Eric, and Morowitz, Harold J. (2005). “A mechanism for the association of amino acids with their codons and the origin of the genetic code”, Proceedings of the National Academy of Sciences of the United States of America, Vol. 102, Issue 12 (March 11, 2005), pp. 4442–4447. doi: 10.1073/pnas.0501049102
- Morowitz, Harold J., Srinivasan, Vijaysarathy, Copley, Shelley and Smith, Eric (2005). “The Simplest Enzyme Revisited: The Chicken and Egg Argument Solved”, Complexity, Vol., No. 5, pp. 12–13. doi: 10.1002/cplx.20087
- Morowitz, Harold J., Broyles, Daniel and Lasus, Howard (2005). “The Robustness of Intermediary Metabolism”, pp. 154–159. In: Sapp, J. (Ed.), Microbial Phylogeny and Evolution: Concepts and Controversies, Oxford University Press, 2005.
- Morowitz, Harold J., Srinivasan, Vijayasarathy and Smith, Eric (2006). “The Swiss Army Knife of Biological Catalysis: A Compact Toolkit of Organic Functional Groups”, Complexity, Vol. 11, No. 3, pp. 9–10. doi: 10.1002/cplx.20112
- Copley, Shelley D., Smith, Eric and Morowitz, Harold J. (2007). “The origin of the RNA world: Co-evolution of genes and metabolism”, Bioorganic Chemistry, Vol. 35, Issue 6 (December 2007), pp. 430–443. doi: 10.1016/j.bioorg.2007.08.001
- Smith, Eric and Morowitz, Harold J. (2007). “Framing the question of fine-tuning for intermediary metabolism”, pp. 384–420. In: John D. Barrow, Simon Conway Morris, Stephen J. Freeland and Charles L. Harper, Jr. (Eds.), Fitness of the Cosmos for Life: Biochemistry and Fine-Tuning, Cambridge University Press, 2007. doi: 10.1017/CBO9780511536557.020
- Morowitz, Harold J., Smith, Eric, Srinivasan, Vijayasarathi (2008). “Selfish Metabolism”, Complexity, Vol. 14, Issue 2 (November/December 2008), pp. 7–9. doi: 10.1002/cplx.20258
- Srinivasan, Vijayasarathy and Morowitz, Harold J. (2009). “The Canonical Network of Autotrophic Intermediary Metabolism: Minimal Metabolome of a Reductive Chemoautotroph”, Biological Bulletin, Vol. 216, No. 2 (April 2009), pp. 126–130. doi: 10.1086/BBLv216n2p126
- Srinivasan, Vijayasarathy and Morowitz, Harold J. (2009). “Analysis of the Intermediary Metabolism of a Reductive Chemoautotroph”, Biological Bulletin, Vol. 217, No. 3 (December 2009), pp. 222–232. doi: 10.1086/BBLv217n3p222
- Smith, Eric, Morowitz, Harold J. and Copley, Shelley D. (2008). “Core Metabolism as a Self-Organized System”, pp. 432–460. In: Steen Rasmussen, Mark A. Bedau, Liaohai Chen, David Deamer, David C. Krakauer, Norman H. Packard, and Peter F. Stadler (Eds.), Protocells: Bridging Nonliving and Living Matter, MIT Press, 2008. doi: 10.7551/mitpress/9780262182683.003.0020
- Morowitz, Harold J., Srinivasan, Vijayasarathy and Smith, Eric (2009). “Revolution in Organic Chemistry and Its Implication in Biogenesis”, Complexity, Vol. 14, Issue 6 (July/August 2009), pp. 7–8. doi: 10.1002/cplx.20286
- Morowitz, Harold J., Srinivasan, Vijayasarathy and Smith, Eric (2010). “Ligand Field Theory and the Origin of Life as an Emergent Feature of the Periodic Table of Elements”, Biological Bulletin, Vol. 219, No. 1 (August 2010), pp. 1–6. doi: 10.1086/BBLv219n1p1
- Smith, Eric and Morowitz, Harold J. (2010). “The Autotrophic Origins Paradigm and Small-Molecule Organocatalysis”, Origins of Life and Evolution of Biospheres, Vol. 40, Issue 4–5 (October 2010), pp. 397–402. doi: 10.1007/s11084-010-9213-2
- Smith, Eric and Morowitz, Harold J. (2010). “Confederacy Based on Synthetic-pathway and Bio-energetic Modularity”, Origins of Life and Evolution of Biospheres, Vol. 40, Issue 4–5 (October 2010), pp. 467–475. doi: 10.1007/s11084-010-9213-2
- Srinivasan, Vijayasarathy, Morowitz, Harold J. and Huber, Harald (2012). “What is an autotroph?”, Archives of Microbiology, Vol. 194, Issue 2 (February 2012), pp. 135–140. doi: 10.1007/s00203-011-0755-0

=== Textbooks and proceedings ===
- Proceedings of the First National Biophysics Conference. Yale University Press, 1959, Morowitz, H.J. and Quastler, H., Editors.
- Life and the Physical Sciences: Introduction to Biophysics. Holt, Rinehart and Winston, Inc., 1963, Morowitz, H.J.
- Theoretical and Mathematical Biology. Blaisdell Publishing Co., 1965, Waterman, T. and Morowitz, H., Editors.
- Energy Flow in Biology. Academic Press, 1968, Morowitz, Harold J.
- Entropy for Biologists. Academic Press, 1970, Morowitz, Harold J.
- Foundations of Bioenergetics. Academic Press, 1978, Morowitz, Harold J.
- Models for Biomedical Research: A New Perspective. National Academy Press, 1985, Committee on Models for Biomedical Research, Harold J. Morowitz, Chairman.
- Report of the Matrix of Biological Knowledge Workshop: July 13-August 14, 1987, Santa Fe Institute, 1987, Morowitz, Harold J. and Smith Temple.
- The Mind, the Brain, and Complex Adaptive Systems, Addison-Wesley, 1994, Morowitz, Harold J. and Singer, Jerome L.

=== Popular works ===
- Life on the Planet Earth. W. W. Norton & Co., 1974, Morowitz, H.J. and Morowitz, L.S.
- Ego Niches: An Ecological View of Organizational Behavior. Ox Bow Press, 1977, Morowitz, Harold J.
- The Wine of Life & Other Essays on Societies, Energy, & Living Things. St. Martin's Press, 1979, Morowitz, Harold J.
- Mayonnaise and The Origin of Life: Thoughts of Minds and Molecules. Charles Scribner's Sons, 1985, Morowitz, Harold J.
- Cosmic Joy and Local Pain: Musings of a Mystical Scientist. Charles Scribner's Sons, 1987, Morowitz, Harold J.
- The Thermodynamics of Pizza. Rutgers University Press, 1991, Morowitz, Harold J.
- The Facts of Life. Oxford University Press, 1992, Morowitz, Harold J. and Trefil, James.
- Beginnings of Cellular Life: Metabolism Recapitulates Biogenesis. Yale University Press, 1992, Morowitz, Harold J.
- Entropy and the Magic Flute. Oxford University Press, 1997, Morowitz, Harold J.
- The Kindly Dr. Guillotin and Other Essays on Science and Life. Counterpoint, 1997, Morowitz, Harold J.
- The Emergence of Everything: How the World Became Complex. Oxford University Press, 2002, Morowitz, Harold J.
- The Origin and Nature of Life on Earth: The Emergence of the Fourth Geosphere. Cambridge University Press, 2016, Smith, Eric and Morowitz, Harold J.
