= Bijvoetite-(Y) =

Uranyl carbonate mineral

General
- Category: Carbonate mineral
- Formula: (Y,REE)_{8}(UO_{2})_{16}(CO_{3})_{16}O_{8}(OH)_{8}•39H_{2}O
- IMA symbol: Bij-Y
- Strunz classification: 5.EB.20 (10 ed); 5/F.06-30 (8 ed)
- Dana classification: 16b.2.4.1
- Crystal system: Monoclinic
- Crystal class: Spheroidal (2) (same H-M symbol)
- Space group: B2_{1}
- Unit cell: a = 21.23, b = 12.96, c = 44.91 [Å], β = 90.00° (approximated); Z = 4

Identification
- Color: Yellow
- Crystal habit: Plates
- Cleavage: {001}, good
- Mohs scale hardness: 2
- Luster: Vitreous
- Streak: Light yellow
- Diaphaneity: Transparent to translucent
- Density: 3.97 (measured)
- Optical properties: Biaxal (+)
- Refractive index: n_{α} = 1.60, n_{β} = 1.65, n_{γ} = 1.72 (approximated)
- Pleochroism: Colorless (X), pale yellow (Y), deep yellow (Z)
- 2V angle: 84° (measured)
- Other characteristics: Radioactive

Bijvoetite-(Y) is a very rare rare-earth and uranium mineral with the formula (Y,REE)_{8}(UO_{2})_{16}(CO_{3})_{16}O_{8}(OH)_{8}·39H_{2}O. When compared to the original description, the formula of bijvoetite-(Y) was changed in the course of crystal structure redefinition. Bijvoetite-(Y) is an example of natural salts containing both uranium and yttrium, the other examples being kamotoite-(Y) and sejkoraite-(Y). Bijvoetite-(Y) comes from Shinkolobwe deposit in Republic of Congo, which is famous for rare uranium minerals. The other interesting rare-earth-bearing uranium mineral, associated with bijvoetite-(Y), is lepersonnite-(Gd).

The mineral is named after the Dutch chemist and crystallographer Johannes Martin Bijvoet.

== Notes on chemistry ==
Other rare-earth elements substituting for yttrium ("REE" in the given formula) are mainly neodymium, samarium, gadolinium, and dysprosium, with minor cerium, europium, terbium and erbium. This is in slight opposition to the original reported analysis, that had dysprosium, gadolinium and terbium as main substituting REE.

== Occurrence and association ==
Bijvoetite-(Y) was found in the Shinkolobwe dolomite-hosted uranium deposit, Republic of Congo, where it occurs in an oxidation zone, together with numerous other uranium minerals: lepersonnite-(Gd), becquerelite, curite, kasolite, oursinite, rutherfordine, schoepite, sklodowskite, soddyite, studtite, torbernite, and uranophane.

== Crystal structure ==
Although originally thought to be orthorhombic, bijvoetite-(Y) was later shown to be monoclinic. The structural formula of the mineral is [M^{3+}_{8}^{3+}(H_{2}O)_{25}(UO_{2})_{16}O_{8}(OH)_{8}(CO_{3})_{16}](H_{2}O)_{14}, where M = (Y,REE). The structure has 16 uranium sites, with uranium belonging to near-linear uranyl groups. The important features of the structure are:

- presence of uranyl pentagonal bipyramids (UPB), formed by coordination of (eight) uranyl groups by three oxide and two hydroxyl anions
- presence of uranyl hexagonal bipyramids (UHB), formed by coordination of another eight uranyl groups by six oxide anions
- presence of uranyl carbonate chain parallel to [100], of a novel type, built of edge-sharing dimers of UPB and UHB, and carbonate groups
- presence of irregular M^{3+}Φ_{n} polyhedra (Φ - unspecified ligand) linking the uranyl carbonate chain, thus forming a compound novel-type sheet parallel to (010)
- location of 14 water molecules in the interlayer space (held by hydrogen bonding)
- bonding of the remaining 25 water molecules to trivalent cations
