= Gauthierite =

Hydrous oxyuranyl mineral

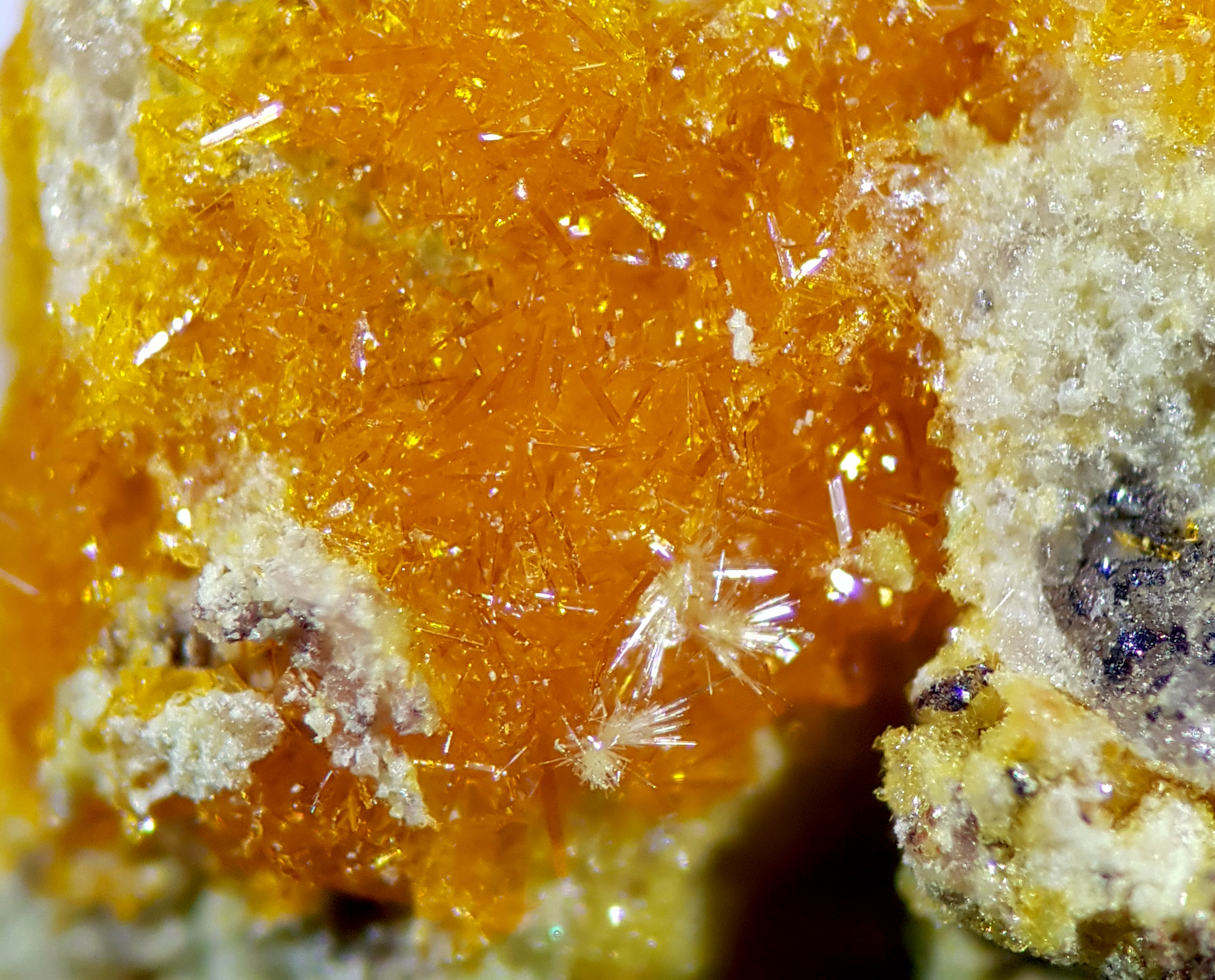
- Gauthierite crystals from Shinkolobwe Mine; approximate field of view 3 mm (0.12 in)

General
- Category: Oxide mineral
- Formula: idealised: KPb[(UO_{2})_{7}O_{5}(OH)_{7}]·8H_{2}O; empirical: K0.67 Pb0.78 U7 O34 H23.77
- IMA symbol: Gut
- Strunz classification: 4.GB
- Crystal system: Monoclinic
- Crystal class: 2/m
- Space group: P2_{1}/c

Identification
- Color: orange
- Crystal habit: Tabular crystals
- Cleavage: Perfect [010]
- Fracture: Uneven
- Mohs scale hardness: 3–4
- Luster: Glassy
- Streak: Light orange
- Diaphaneity: Transparent (single crystals), translucent (masses)
- Density: calculated: 5.437
- Optical properties: Biaxial (-)
- Refractive index: nα = 1.780(5) nβ = 1.815(5) nγ = 1.825(5)
- Pleochroism: x: very pale yellow, y = z = orange-yellow
- Other characteristics: Radioactive

Gauthierite is a very rare mineral with the idealised chemical sum formula KPb[(UO_{2})_{7}O_{5}(OH)_{7}]·8H_{2}O. It is a radioactive, hydrated orange-coloured lead potassium uranyl oxide hydroxide. It was found by analysing old mineral specimens, and is only known from one locality, the Shinkolobwe Mine in the Democratic Republic of the Congo. The mineral was named in honour of Gilbert Gauthier, a Belgian collector of uranium minerals, who provided a sample to one of the co-authors of the study that first identified it in 2017.

== Etymology and history ==
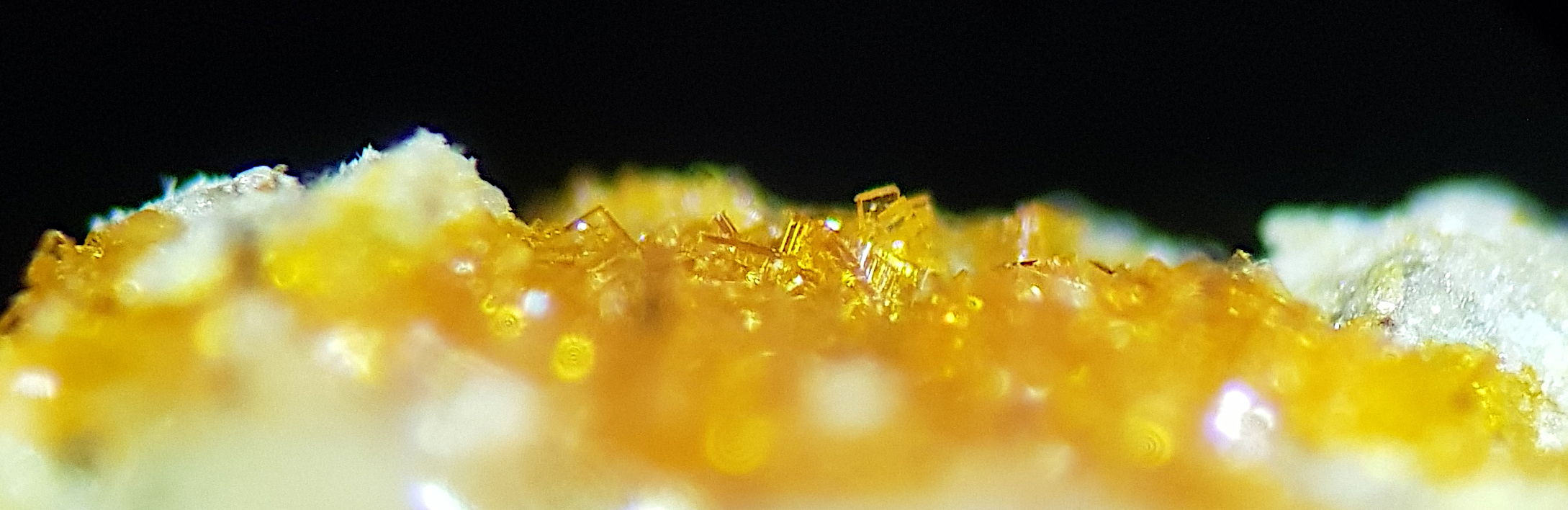
Gauthierite crystals on matrix (field of view app. 3 mm)

Gauthierite is a very rare mineral and was first described in 2017. It was discovered on an old mineralogical sample from Shinkolobwe Mine, Democratic Republic of the Congo. A co-author of the original study was given the sample by Gilbert Joseph Gauthier (24. December 1924 – 23. June 2006), a Belgian mineral collector who focused on uranium minerals, after whom the mineral was named.

== Classification ==
According to the International Mineralogical Association (IMA), which last updated its list in 2009, the Nickel-Strunz system lists gauthierite in the section of "oxides and hydroxides" amongst the "uranyl hydroxides". There it forms the group 4.GB, together with leesite K(H_{2}O)_{2}[(UO_{2})_{4}O_{2}(OH)_{5}]·3H_{2}O, shinkolobweite Pb_{1.25}[U^{5+}(H_{2}O)_{2}(U^{6+}O_{2})_{5}O_{8}(OH)_{2}](H_{2}O)_{5} and kroupaite KPb_{0.5}[(UO_{2})_{8}O_{4}(OH)_{10}]·10H_{2}O.

== Chemistry ==
An analysis by electron microprobe using nine samples of the type material gave an averaged composition of 1.29 w.-% K_{2}O, 7.17 w.-% PbO, 82.10 w.-% UO_{3} and 8.78 w.-% H_{2}O. Based on 34 oxygen atoms this gives the empirical sum formula K_{0.67}Pb_{0.78}U_{7}O_{34}H_{23.77}, which is idealised as KPb[(UO_{2})_{7}O_{5}(OH)_{7}]∙8H_{2}O.

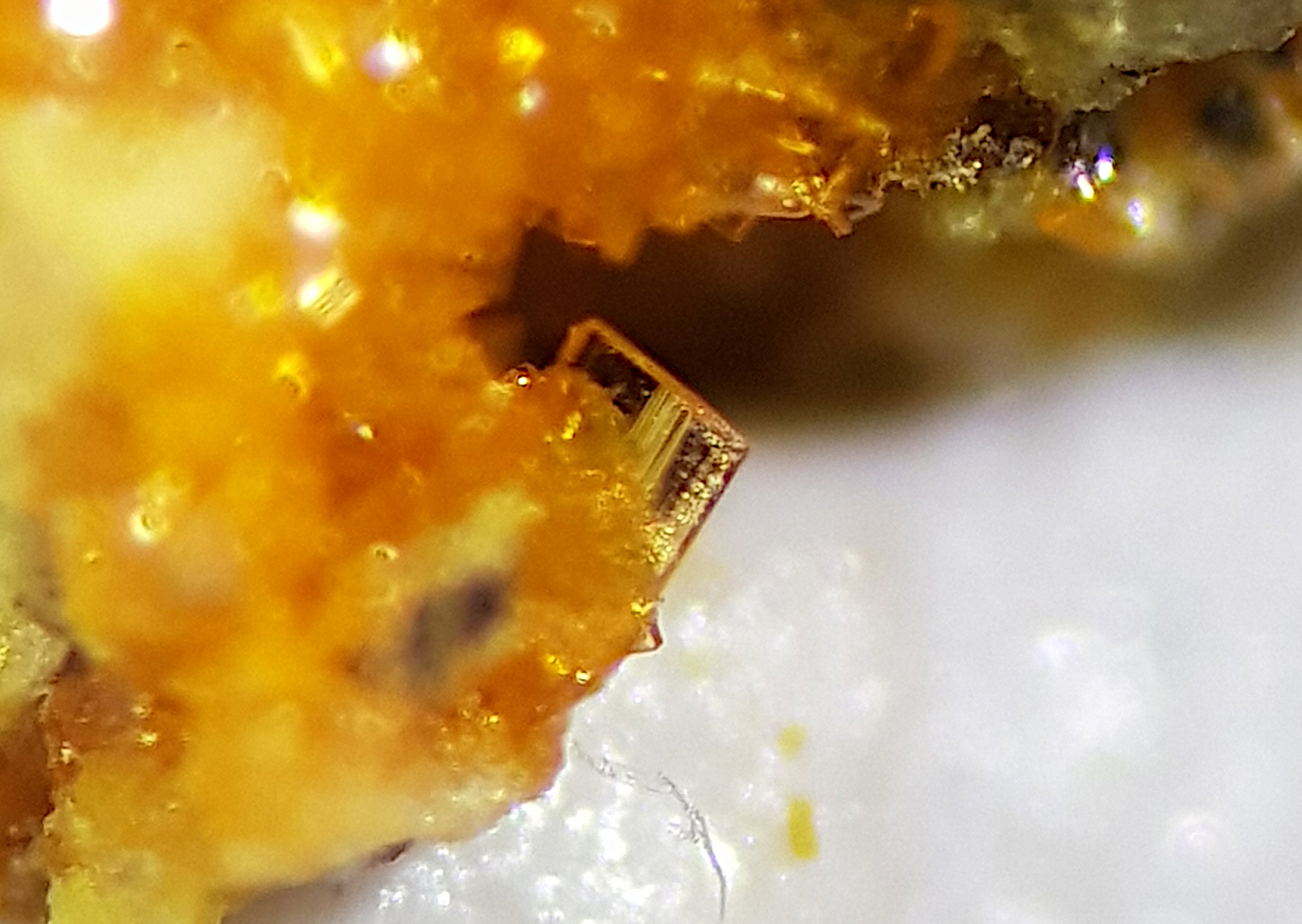
Gauthierite single crystal (app. 0.1 mm)

Gauthierite crystallises monoclinically in space group P2_{1}/c with the lattice parameters a = 29.844(2) Å; b = 14.5368(8) Å and c = 14.0406(7) Å and β = 103.708(6)° with eight formula units per unit cell. The crystal structure is related to that of vandendriesscheite. Together with fourmarierite these three minerals form a group of early stage alteration products which are formed in the oxidation-hydration weathering of uraninite. This is particularly prominent in the amount of water between the uranyl layers.

Because of its uranium content of about 67.2% the material is strongly radioactive.

== Occurrence and localities ==
Gauthierite has so far been only identified on old mineralogical samples from its type locality Shinkolobwe Mine in the Democratic Republic of the Congo. The mineral is associated on the type specimen with soddyite, sklodowskite and a member of the metazeunerite-metatorbernite series. The matrix of the type material is quartz with disseminated altered uraninite. The mineral may form by weathering of uraninite in the presence of radiogenic lead, while potassium may be leached from other gangue materials.

== See also ==
- List of minerals
- List of minerals named after people
