= Shinkolobwe =

Former mine in the Democratic Republic of the Congo

Shinkolobwe mine
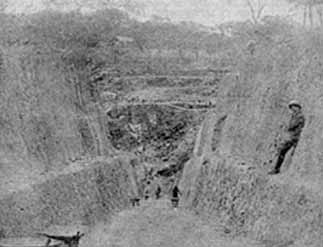
- Shinkolobwe mine, 1925

- Location within Democratic Republic of the Congo Location within Africa
- Location: Shinkolobwe, Katanga, Democratic Republic of the Congo; 11°03′17.9″S 26°32′50.2″E
- Products: Uranium ore
- Closed: 2004

Shinkolobwe, or Kasolo, or Chinkolobew, or Shainkolobwe, was a radium and uranium mine in the Haut-Katanga Province of the Democratic Republic of the Congo (DRC), located 20 km (12.4 mi) west of Likasi (formerly Jadotville), 20 km (12.4 mi) south of Kambove, and about 145 km (90.1 mi) northwest of Lubumbashi.

The mine produced the most economical uranium ore in the world and was used for the Manhattan Project and subsequent nuclear weapons produced by the United States in the 1940s and 50s. Before World War II, uranium extracted here was originally taken to Belgium to be processed; this supply was captured by the Wehrmacht in 1940 and subsequently used for the unsuccessful German nuclear program.

The Shinkolobwe mine was officially closed in 2004.

== Toponym ==
The mine's name was taken from the long-gone nearby village of Shinkolobwe. It is also slang for "a man who is easygoing on the surface but who becomes angry when provoked".

== Geology ==
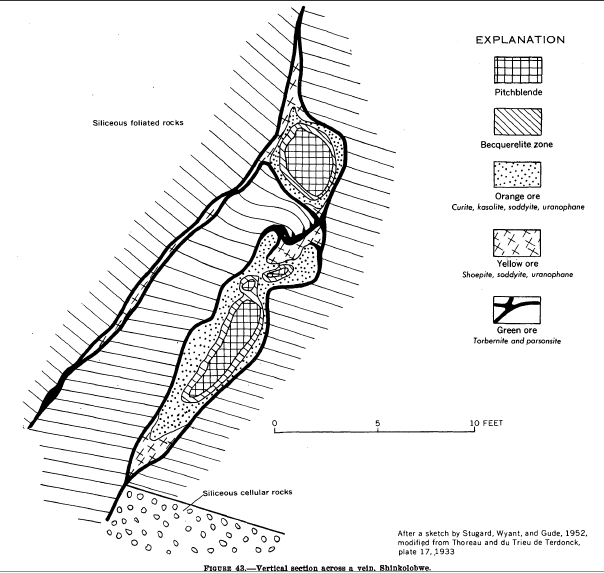
Shinkolobwe vein geologic cross section showing successive layers of uranyl minerals

The mineral deposits at Shinkolobwe were discovered in 1915 by the English geologist Robert Rich Sharp (1881–1960).

The formations of the Shinkolobwe ore deposit form a spur of the Mine Series wedged into a fold-fault. Uranium minerals, and associated cobalt, silver, nickel, bismuth and arsenic, occur as massive sulfide ore in veinlets along fractures, joints, and minor faults within the Katanga synclinorium. Uraninite mineralization occurred 630 Ma ago, when uraniferous solutions percolated into the dolomitic shales of the Precambrian Mine Series (Serie des Mines), under the Roche Argilotalqueuse (R.A.T.) nappe. The Mine Series is a Schist-Dolomite System postulated to be in the Roan System. This schistose-dolomite appears structurally between two contacts of the Kundelungu System, the Middle Kundelungu and the Lower Kundelungu, of the Katanga Group. The Lower and Upper Kundelungu form a double syncline, the northern limb of which overlies the Shinkolobwe Fault. These structural complexities aside, the Katanga stratigraphic column consists, top to bottom, of the Precambrian Kundelungu System (Upper, Middle and Lower), the Grand Conglomerate and Mwashya Systems, the Schist-Dolomite System (Roan System-Mine Series of R.G.S., C.M.N., S.D., R.S.C., R.S.F., D. Strat., R.A.T. Gr., and R.A.T.) and the Kibara Group.

Uraninite crystals from 1 to 4 centimeter cubes were common. New minerals identified here include ianthinite, becquerelite, schoepite, curite, fourmarierite, masuyite, vandendriesscheite, richetite, billietite, vandenbrandeite, kasolite, soddyite, sklodowskite, cuprosklodowskite, dewindtite, dumontite, renardite, parsonsite, saleite, sharpite, studtite, and diderichite. Similar uraninite deposits occur 36 km (22.4 mi) west at Swampo, and 120 km (74.6 mi) west at Kalongwe.

Surface ores consist of oxidized minerals from supergene alteration above the water table and the formation of uranyl minerals. Below the water table, hypogene ores include uraninite (pitchblende), cobalt-nickel sulfides and selenides.

== History ==
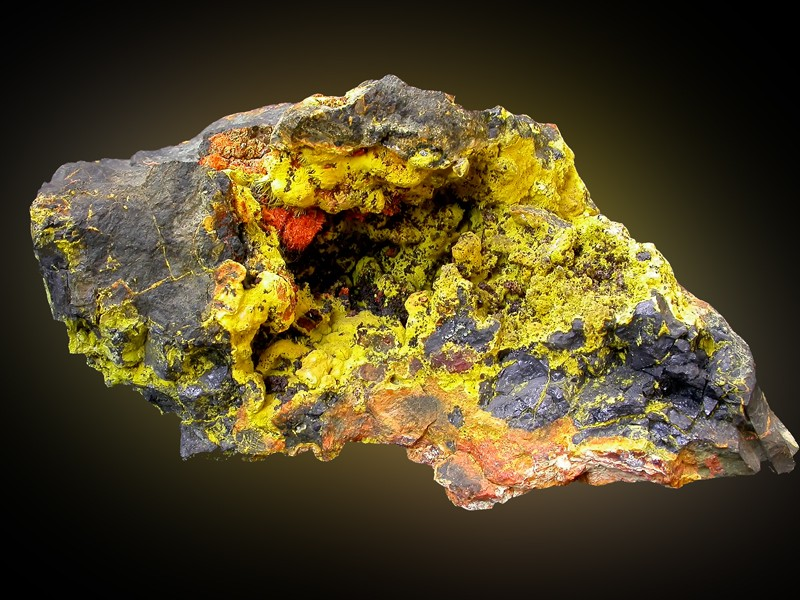
Schoepite-curite-uraninite, huge old specimen. Very heavy, as matrix is pure uraninite (steel-gray). Shinkolobwe is the type locality for schoepite and curite. Ex-Carnegie Museum of Natural History, removed from display for being "too hot" (radioactive). Size: 14.0 x 10.0 x 7.2 cm.

The first mine was opened in the Belgian Congo in 1921. Uranium-bearing ore was initially exported to Olen, Belgium for the extraction of radium, and uranium. Only the richest ore was sent to Olen, with the remainder held in reserve. Open-cut mining was suspended at level 57 m (187.0 ft) and at the level 79 m (259.2 ft) underground in 1936, though exploration had commenced at level 114 m (374.0 ft), and water pumps installed at level 150 m (492.1 ft).

Both Britain and France expressed interest in the Belgium inventory of uranium ore in 1939. Nothing further happened though after the Nazis occupied Belgium in 1940 and got control of the ore still "on the docks". However, of the 1200 tons confiscated, the Alsos Mission was able to recover most of this uranium in 1945.

Open-cut operations restarted in 1944, and underground in 1945, which required pumping the mine dry since the water table was at about 45 m. The 255 m level was reached in 1955.

=== Manhattan Project ===
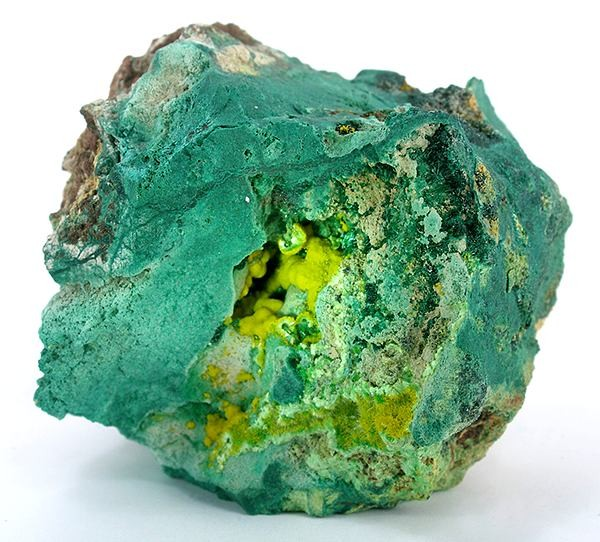
Uranophane in malachite specimen from the Shinkolobwe mine

The United States used Shinkolobwe's uranium resources to supply the Manhattan Project to construct the atomic bomb in World War II. Edgar Sengier, then director of Union Minière du Haut Katanga, had stockpiled 1,200 tonnes of uranium ore in a warehouse on Staten Island, New York. This ore and an additional 3,000 tonnes of ore stored above-ground at the mine was purchased by Colonel Ken Nichols for use in the project. Nichols wrote:

Our best source, the Shinkolobwe mine, represented a freak occurrence in nature. It contained a tremendously rich lode of uranium pitchblende. Nothing like it has ever again been found. The ore already in the United States contained 65 percent U_{3}O_{8}, while the pitchblende aboveground in the Congo amounted to a thousand tons of 65 percent ore, and the waste piles of ore contained two thousand tons of 20 percent U_{3}O_{8}. To illustrate the uniqueness of Sengier's stockpile, after the war the MED and the AEC considered ore containing 0.3 percent as a good find. Without Sengier's foresight in stockpiling ore in the United States and aboveground in Africa, we simply would not have had the amounts of uranium needed to justify building the large separation plants and the plutonium reactors.

In 1940, 1,200 tons of stockpiled uranium ore were shipped to the US by Sengier's African Metals Corp., a commercial arm of Union Minière. After the September 1942 agreement with Nichols, an average of 400 tons of uranium oxide was then shipped to the US each month. Initially, the port of Lobito was used to ship the ore, but later Matadi was used to improve security. Only two shipments were lost at sea. The aerodromes in Elizabethville and Leopoldville were also expanded. Additionally, the mine was reopened with the help of the United States Army Corps of Engineers, which involved draining the water and retooling the facility. Finally, the Office of Strategic Services were enlisted to deal with the threat of smuggling to Germany.

American interest in the Shinkolobwe mine for the purpose of developing of nuclear weapons led to the implementation of extensive security measures. Shinkolobwe's location was removed from maps and journalists were denied access to the mine and official information.

=== Cold War era ===
Just as a lack of uranium ore impeded the German and Japanese attempts to make an atomic bomb, the Americans wanted to maintain their monopoly against the Soviets.

Security measures were slightly more relaxed in the wake of World War II, but in the 1950s, most journalists were able to gather only scraps of information on the mine's operation, from unofficial sources. In 1950, a uranium processing plant was said to be under construction near the mine. At the time, Shinkolobwe was believed to contain roughly half of the world's known reserves of uranium.

In 1947, the US received 1,440 tons of uranium concentrates from the Belgian Congo, 2,792 in 1951, and 1,600 in 1953. A processing plant was added nearby, and for increased security, a garrison was also established, with a supporting NATO military base in Kamina. Jadotville became a security checkpoint for foreigners. However, by the time of Congo independence, Union Minière had sealed the mine with concrete.

Despite the American presence in the 1940s and 1950s, the increased opening of uranium mines in the US and Congolese independence made the United States in 1960 leave the mine, which caused the sealing of the mine by Union Minière.

=== Israeli yellowcake ===
In what was termed Operation Plumbat, Israel, in 1968, obtained yellowcake (processed uranium ore) to support the Israeli nuclear weapons program in a clandestine operation after France stopped supplying it with uranium fuel for the Dimona nuclear reactor in reaction to the 1967 Arab-Israeli War. Numerous sources believe that in 1968 Israel managed to obtain 200 tonnes of yellowcake from the Belgian mining company Union Minière. The company collaborated with Mossad in shipping out the ore from Antwerp to Genoa for a European front company which then surreptitiously transferred the ore to another vessel at night on the Mediterranean Sea.

=== Closure ===
The mine was officially closed on January 28, 2004, by presidential decree. However, eight people died and a further thirteen people were injured in July 2004, when part of the old mine collapsed. Although industrial production has ceased with cement lids sealing off the mine shafts, there is evidence that some artisanal mining still goes on there. A United Nations inter-agency mission, led by the UN Office for Coordination of Humanitarian Affairs (OCHA) and the United Nations Environment Programme (UNEP), and organised through their Joint Environment Unit, visited the mine. The UNEP/OCHA concluded:

Shinkolobwe is representative of similar situations in Africa and elsewhere in the developing world. A strong link exists between rural poverty, environmental protection and this type of livelihood activity. Alternative income opportunities must be developed and integrated in parallel to artisanal exploitation if new livelihood options are to be found for these rural poor. A holistic, multidisciplinary approach within the context of poverty alleviation is essential to address this problem and avoid further human and environmental catastrophes.

=== Artisanal mining and smuggling ===
On July 18, 2006, the DRC Sanctions Committee (United Nations Security Council Committee Established Pursuant to Resolution 1533 (2004), to give it its full name) released a report dated June 15, 2006, which stated that artisanal mining for various minerals continues at the Shinkolobwe mine:

149. During an investigation into alleged smuggling of radioactive materials, the Group of Experts has learned that such incidents are far more frequent than assumed. According to Congolese experts on radioactive materials, organs of State security have, during the past six years, confiscated over 50 cases containing uranium or cesium in and around Kinshasa. The last significant incident occurred in March 2004 when two containers with over 100 kilograms of stable uranium-238 and uranium-235 were secured. 150. In response to a request for information by the Group of Experts the Government of the United Republic of Tanzania has provided limited data on four shipments that were seized over the past 10 years. Unfortunately the Government chose not to provide information about the quantities of the seized consignments nor the specific method of smuggling. At least in reference to the last shipment from October 2005, the Tanzanian Government left no doubt that the uranium was transported from Lubumbashi by road through Zambia to the United Republic of Tanzania. Attempts via Interpol to learn the precise origin within the Democratic Republic of the Congo have remained inconclusive.

On August 9, 2006, the British Sunday Times published a report claiming that Iran was seeking to import "bomb-making uranium" from the Shinkolobwe mine, providing no evidence but quoting the UN report of July 18, 2006. It gives "Tanzanian customs officials" as its sole source for the claim that the uranium was destined for processing in the former Soviet republic of Kazakhstan via the Iranian port of Bandar Abbas. American journalist Douglas Farah has compared this to North Korean attempts to get uranium from the same mine.

== See also ==
- K-65 residues
- Mining industry of the Democratic Republic of the Congo
- Operation Plumbat
