= Rutherfordine =

Mineral

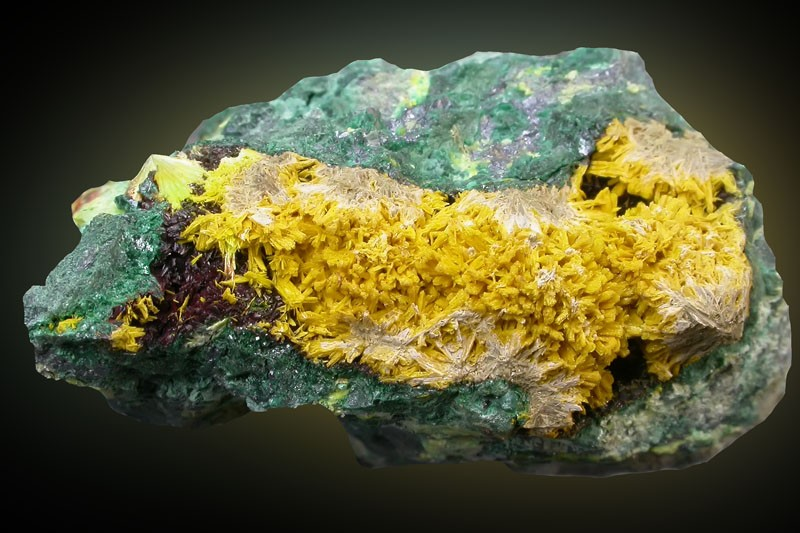

General
- Category: Carbonate mineral
- Formula: UO_{2}CO_{3}
- IMA symbol: Rfd
- Strunz classification: 5.EB.05
- Crystal system: Orthorhombic
- Crystal class: Pyramidal (mm2); H–M Symbol: (mm2)
- Space group: Imm2
- Unit cell: a = 4.840 Å, b = 9.273 Å c = 4.298 Å; Z = 2

Identification
- Colour: Brownish, brownish yellow, white, light brown orange, or light yellow
- Crystal habit: Crystals are Lathlike, elongated crystals commonly radiating, fibrous, matted; earthy to very fine-grained masses.
- Cleavage: perfect on {010}, good on {001}
- Lustre: Silky, dull
- Streak: Yellow
- Diaphaneity: Transparent
- Specific gravity: 5.7
- Optical properties: Biaxial (+)
- Refractive index: n_{α} = 1.700 - 1.723 n_{β} = 1.716 - 1.730 n_{γ} = 1.755 - 1.795
- Birefringence: δ = 0.055 - 0.072
- Pleochroism: Visible X= colorless, Y= pale yellow, Z= pale greenish yellow
- 2V angle: Calculated: 53°
- Other characteristics: Radioactive

Rutherfordine is a mineral containing almost pure uranyl carbonate (UO_{2}CO_{3}). It crystallizes in the orthorhombic system in translucent lathlike, elongated, commonly radiating in fibrous, and in pulverulent, earthy to very fine-grained dense masses. It has a specific gravity of 5.7 and exhibits two directions of cleavage. It appears as brownish, brownish yellow, white, light brown orange, or light yellow fluorescent encrustations. It is also known as diderichite.

It was first described in 1906 for an occurrence in the Morogoro Region of Tanzania. It was named for Ernest Rutherford. It has been reported in the Democratic Republic of Congo, the Northern Territory of Australia and a variety of locations worldwide.

It occurs as a secondary mineral as a weathering product of uraninite. In addition to uraninite it occurs associated with the rare minerals becquerelite, masuyite, schoepite, kasolite, curite, boltwoodite, vandendriesscheite, billietite, metatorbernite, fourmarierite, studtite and sklodowskite. It forms under acidic to neutral pH and is the only known mineral that contains only uranyl and carbonate.
