= Curite =

Rare mineral

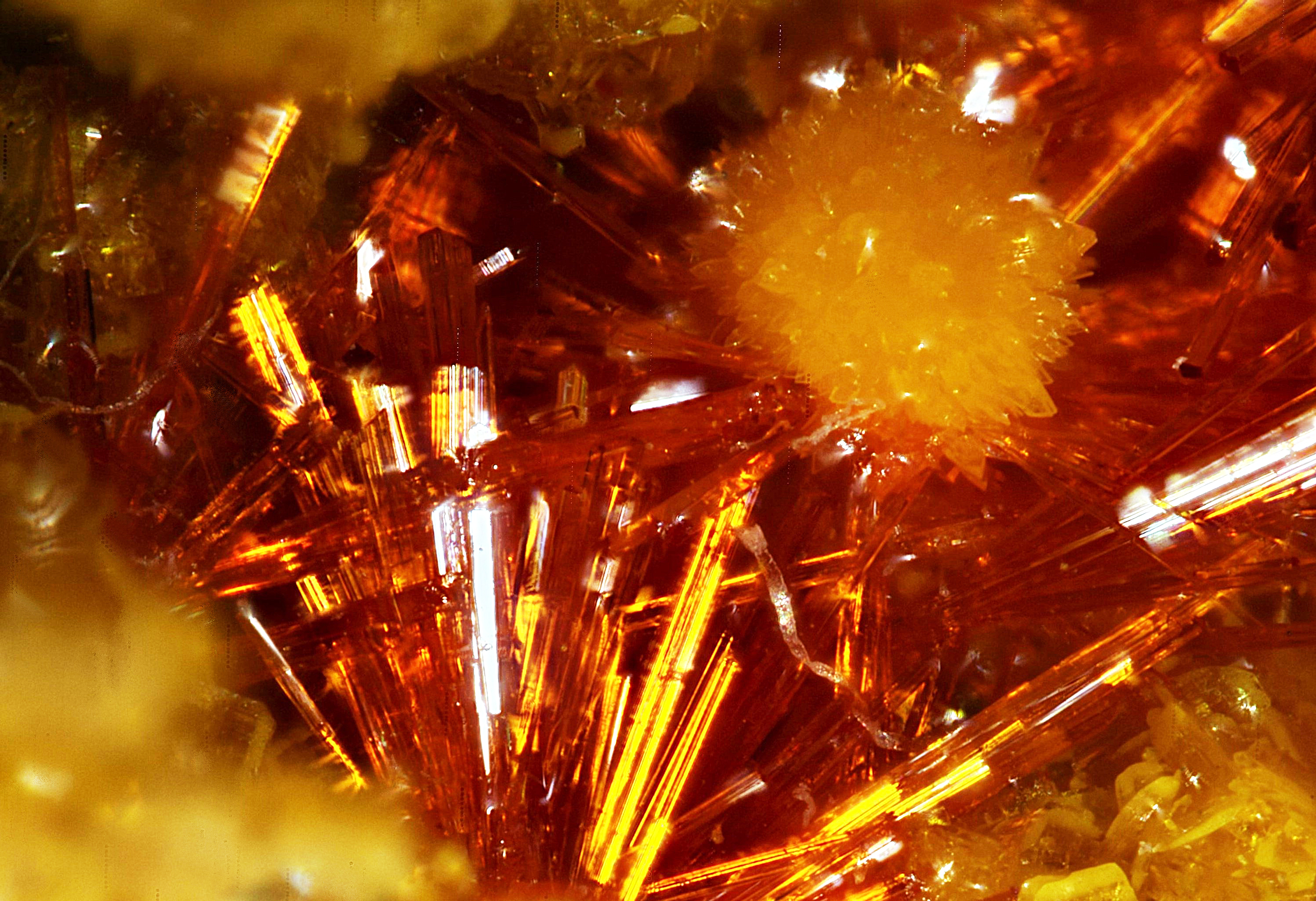
- Orange-red curite needles from Shinkolobwe mine, Katanga Province, Democratic Republic of the Congo

General
- Category: Oxide mineral
- Formula: Pb_{3}[(UO_{2})_{4}|O_{4}|(OH)_{3}]_{2}·2 H_{2}O
- IMA symbol: Cui
- Strunz classification: 4.GB.55
- Crystal system: Orthorhombic
- Crystal class: orthorhombic-dipyramidal; 2/m 2/m 2/m
- Space group: Pnam
- Unit cell: a = 12.551 Å, b = 13.02 Å, c = 8.40 Å; Z = 2

Identification
- Color: red, reddish orange, brownish yellow.
- Crystal habit: needles, acicular, massive, compact earthy.
- Cleavage: {100}, imperfect}
- Fracture: uneven
- Tenacity: brittle
- Mohs scale hardness: 4-5
- Luster: adamantine
- Streak: orange
- Diaphaneity: transparent
- Density: measured: 6.98–7.4; calculated: 7,37
- Optical properties: biaxial (-)
- Refractive index: n_{α} = 2.060 n_{β} = 2.110 n_{γ} = 2.150
- Birefringence: 0.090
- Pleochroism: Visible: X = b = pale yellow, Y = a = light red-orange, Z = c = dark red-orange
- 2V angle: 70° (measured); 80° (calculated)
- Other characteristics: Radioactive

Curite is a rare mineral with the chemical composition Pb_{3}[(UO_{2})_{4}|O_{4}|(OH)_{3}]_{2}·2 H_{2}O. It is therefore a hydrated lead uranyl oxide, which forms red needles or orange, massive aggregates.

== Etymology and history ==
Curite was first found at Shinkolobwe mine (formerly known as "Kasolo mine“) in Katanga Province in the Democratic Republic of the Congo. Alfred Schoep (1881–1966) described the mineral for the first time in 1921 and named it after physicist and Nobel laureate Pierre Curie (1859–1906).

== Classification ==
The mineral is classified according to Strunz as part of the uranyl hydroxides, forming its own group with additional cations (K, Ca, Ba, Pb etc.) and primarily UO_{2}(O,OH)_{5} pentagonal polyhedra with system number 4.GB.55.

Dana classifies the mineral to the oxides and hydroxide, as part of the uranium- and thorium-containing oxides with oxidation state +6 containing Pb, Bi, hydroxyl groups or water.

== Crystal structure ==
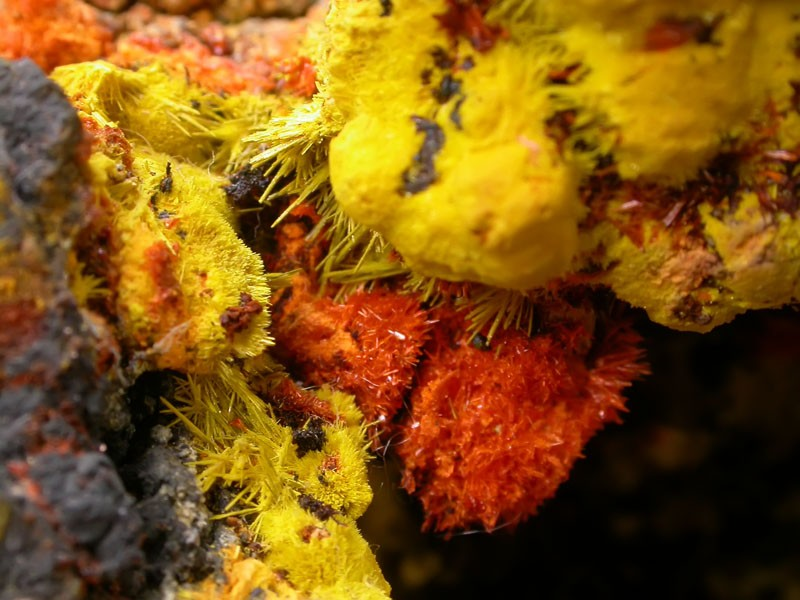
Paragenesis of red curite with yellow schoepite, pseudomorphic after wyartite on uraninite from Shinkolobwe, DRC

Curite crystallizes orthorhombically in space group Pnama with the lattice parameters a = 12.56 Å; b = 13.02 Å and c = 8.40 Å and two formula units per unit cell.

The crystal structure consists of layers of corner- and edge-sharing uranyl polyhedra, in which the uranyl cation shows both pentagonal-bipyramidal and square-bipyramidal coordination. The lead cations connect these layers by coordinating to the oxygen atoms of uranyl group.

== Radioactivity ==
The mineral is radioactive because of its uranium content of about 63%. Considering the composition with respect to the ideal sum formula, a specific activity of about 113,4 kBq/g can be given. The absolute value of any given mineralogical sample may vary drastically depending on the general composition of the mineral with its matrix, the amount of material and its age.

== Occurrence ==
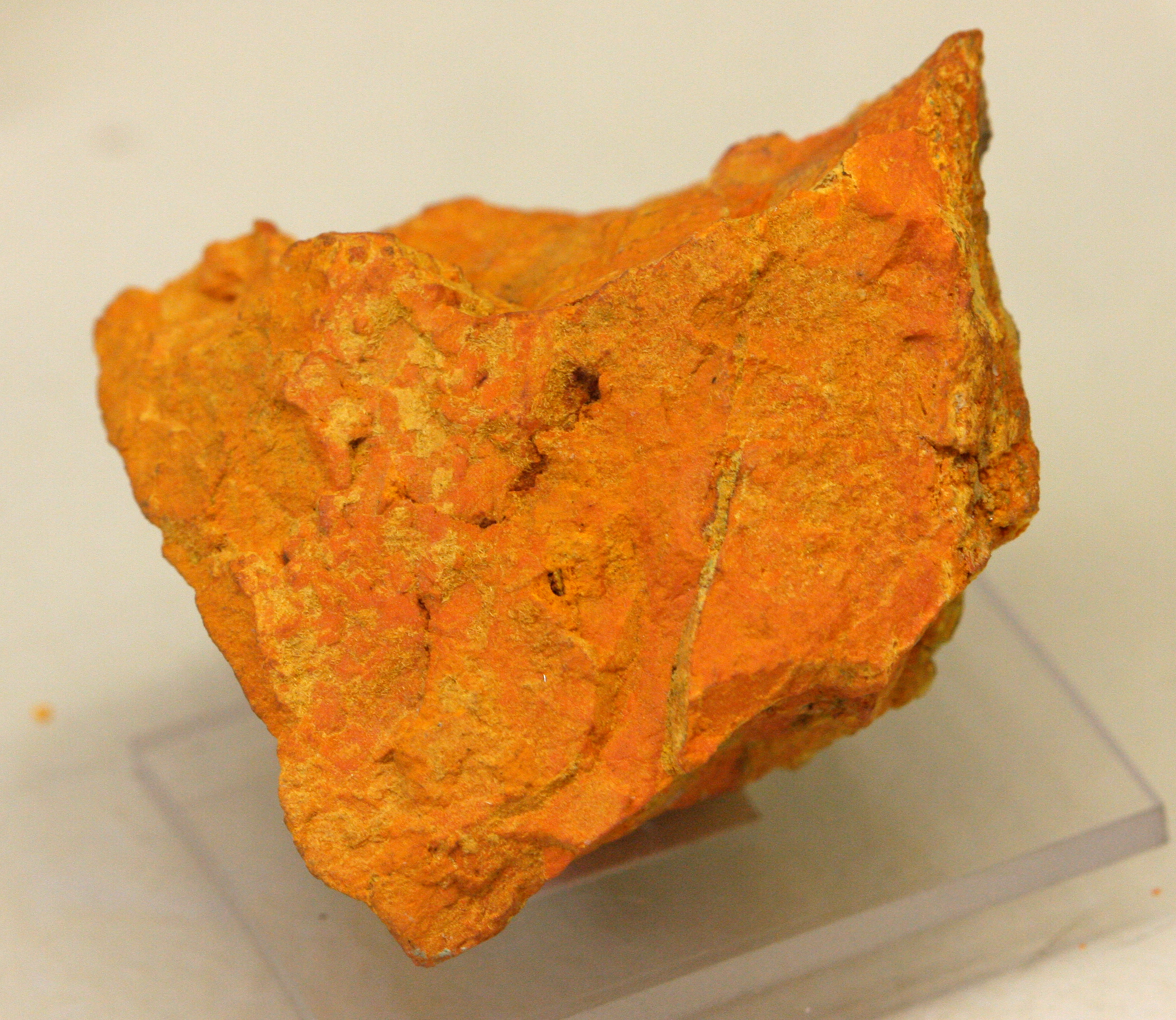
Orange microcrystalline curite from Katanga Province, DRC.

Curite is a secondary uranium mineral, which forms by alteration of geologically old uraninite. Additionally, lead atoms form due to radioactive decay. Curite is found in the oxidation zone along with dewindtite, fourmarierite, kasolite, rutherfordine, schoepite, soddyite, sklodowskite, torbernite and vandendriesscheite.

Curite has been found, apart from its type locality Shinkolobwe mine, at a further 50 localities, e.g. in Egypt; Northern Territory, Australia; Baden-Württemberg, Bavaria, Rhineland-Palatinate and Saxony, Germany; Auvergne, Brittany, Alsace and Limousin, France; Lombardy and Trentino-Alto Adige/Südtirol, Italy; Northwest Territories, Canada; Fianarantsoa, Madagascar; Agder and Telemark, Norway; Karelia, Russia; Namaqualand, South Africa; Bohemia and Moravia, Czechia; Baranya and Heves, Hungary as well as in Colorado, New Hampshire and New Mexico, USA.

== Precautions ==
Because of its radioactivity, samples of this mineral should be kept in air-tight containers. Inhaling the dust or incorporation should be avoided.

== Literature ==
- Paul Ramdohr, Hugo Strunz (1978), Klockmanns Lehrbuch der Mineralogie (16. ed.), Ferdinand Enke Verlag, p. 560, ISBN 3-432-82986-8
- Petr Korbel, Milan Novák (2002), Mineralien Enzyklopädie, Eggolsheim: Nebel Verlag GmbH, p. 111, ISBN 3-89555-076-0
