= Coconinoite =

Uranium ore

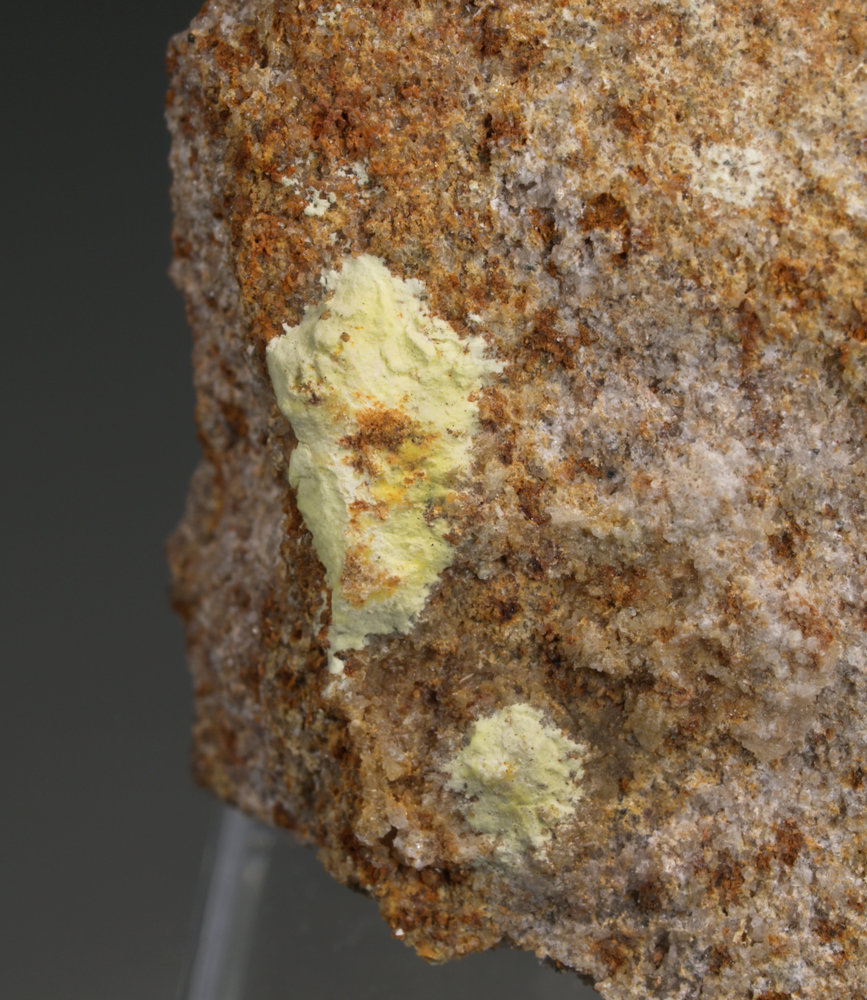
- Coconinoite on a sandstone matrix

General
- Category: Phosphate minerals
- Formula: Fe^{3+}_{2}Al_{2}(UO_{2})_{2}(PO_{4})_{4}(SO_{4})(OH)_{2}•20(H_{2}O)
- IMA symbol: Coc
- Strunz classification: 8.EB.35
- Crystal system: Monoclinic
- Crystal class: Prismatic (2/m) (same H-M symbol)
- Space group: C2/c
- Unit cell: a = 12.45(6) Å, b = 12.96(3) Å, c = 17.22(5) Å; β = 105.7°; Z = 4

Identification
- Formula mass: 489.01 gram/mol
- Color: Pale creamy yellow
- Crystal habit: As lathlike to platy grains, in microcrystalline aggregates seams and crusts.
- Mohs scale hardness: 1-2
- Luster: Adamantine - pearly
- Streak: White
- Diaphaneity: Translucent
- Specific gravity: 2.70
- Optical properties: Biaxial (-)
- Refractive index: n_{α} = 1.550 n_{β} = 1.588 n_{γ} = 1.590
- Birefringence: δ = 0.040
- Pleochroism: X = colorless; Y = Z = pale yellow. Orientation: Y = elongation of laths with positive elongation; Y at 8°-25° to elongation of laths with negative elongation.
- 2V angle: Measured: 28° to 43°, Calculated: 24°
- Other characteristics: Radioactive

Coconinoite is a uranium ore that was discovered in Coconino County, Arizona. It is a phosphate mineral; or uranyl phosphate mineral along with other subclass uranium U^{6+} minerals like blatonite, boltwoodite, metazeunerite and rutherfordine.

== Composition ==
The chemical formula is Fe_{2}Al_{2}(UO_{2})_{2}(PO_{4})_{4}(SO_{4})(OH)_{2}·20H_{2}O. The chemical formula was derived from the spectrographic analysis.

== Physical properties ==
The mineral has a white streak and a pale creamy yellow color. The mineral occurs as microscopic crystals, the largest found is 6 by 20 micrometers. It is a radioactive mineral, but not fluorescent. Upon heating for dehydration it is found that the mineral loses some of its SO_{2} at 600 to 800 °C.

== Geologic occurrence ==
It occurs in the oxidized zone of vanadium-poor Colorado Plateau-type uranium deposits of Utah and Arizona. It occurs in association with gypsum, jarosite, limonite, quartz, clay minerals and coalized wood at the Jomac mine, Utah.

Coconinite was first described in 1966 for occurrences in the Huskon Mines, Cameron, Cameron District and the Sun Valley Mine, Vermillion Cliffs District, Coconino County, Arizona. It was named for Coconino County.
