= Boltwoodite =

Hydrated potassium uranyl silicate mineral

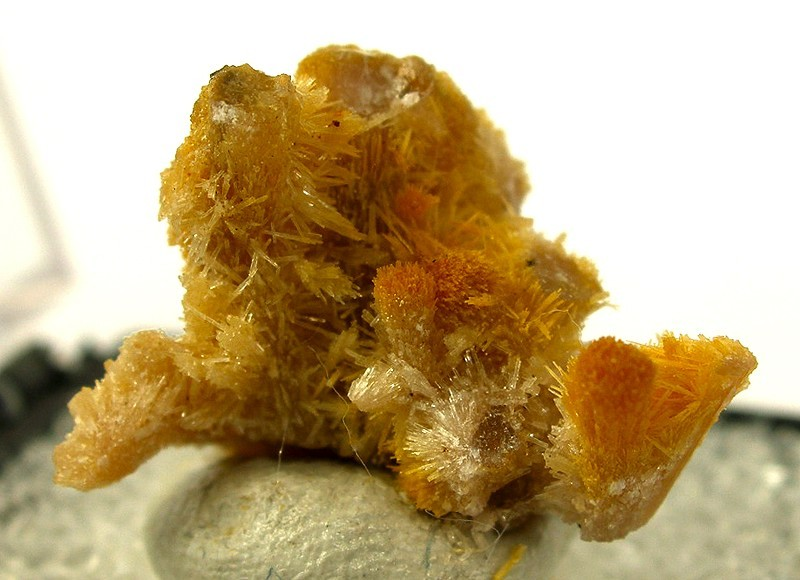
- Acicular crystals of umber-yellow boltwoodite from Namibia (size: 1.8 × 1.7 × 1.4 cm)

General
- Category: Uranium silicate mineral
- Formula: (K_{0.56}Na_{0.42})[(UO_{2})(SiO_{3}OH)]·1.5(H_{2}O)
- IMA symbol: Bdw
- Strunz classification: 9.AK.15
- Crystal system: Monoclinic
- Crystal class: Prismatic (2/m) (same H-M symbol)
- Space group: P2_{1}/m
- Unit cell: a = 7.0772(8) Å, b = 7.0597(8) Å, c = 6.6479(7) Å; β = 104.982(2)°; Z = 2

Identification
- Color: Pale yellow, orange yellow
- Crystal habit: Elongated crystals, acicular to fibrous
- Cleavage: Perfect on {010}, imperfect on {001}
- Tenacity: Brittle
- Mohs scale hardness: 3.5–4
- Luster: Silky to vitreous, dull or earthy in aggregates
- Streak: White
- Diaphaneity: Transparent to translucent
- Specific gravity: 4.7
- Optical properties: Biaxial (−)
- Refractive index: n_{α} = 1.668 – 1.670 n_{β} = 1.695 – 1.696 n_{γ} = 1.698 – 1.703
- Birefringence: δ = 0.030 – 0.033
- Pleochroism: Weak, X = colorless, Y = Z = yellow
- Ultraviolet fluorescence: Fluoresces dull green in both SW and LW UV
- Other characteristics: Radioactive

Boltwoodite is a hydrated uranyl silicate mineral with formula (K_{0.56}Na_{0.42})[(UO_{2})(SiO_{3}OH)]·1.5(H_{2}O), distinct in crystal structure from sodium boltwoodite, which has an orthorhombic structure rather than monoclinic. It is formed from the oxidation and alteration of primary uranium ores. It takes the form of a crust on some sandstones that bear uranium. These crusts tend to be yellowish with a silky or vitreous luster.

== Discovery and occurrence ==
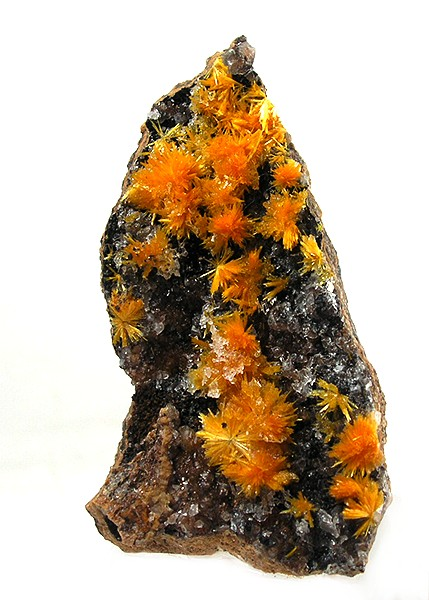
Orange to yellow boltwoodite on dark calcite matrix from Namibia (size: 5.2 x 3 x 2cm)

It was first described in 1956 for an occurrence in Pick's Delta Mine, Delta, San Rafael District (San Rafael Swell), Emery County, Utah, US. It is named after Bertram Boltwood (1870–1927) an American pioneer of radiochemistry.

Boltwoodite occurs as secondary silicate alteration crusts surrounding uraninite and as fracture fillings. It is found in pegmatites and sandstone uranium deposits of the Colorado Plateau-type. It occurs associated with uraninite, becquerelite, fourmarierite, phosphouranylite, gypsum and fluorite.
