= Cuprosklodowskite =

Secondary uranium mineral

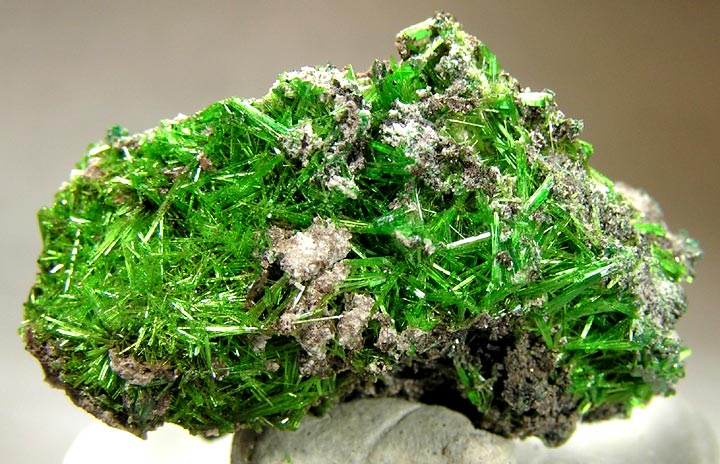
- Cuprosklodowskite, Musonoi mine, Kolwezi, Lualaba District, Democratic Republic of the Congo {3.6 x 2.7 x 2.2 cm}

General
- Category: Uranium mineral
- Formula: Cu(UO_{2})_{2}(HSiO_{4})_{2}·6(H_{2}O)
- IMA symbol: Cskl
- Strunz classification: 9.AK.10
- Crystal system: Triclinic
- Crystal class: Pinacoidal (1̅) (same H-M symbol)
- Space group: P1̅
- Unit cell: a = 7.052(5) Å, b = 9.267(8) Å, c = 6.655(5) Å; α = 109.23°, β = 89.84°, γ = 110.01°; Z = 1

Identification
- Color: Yellowish to grass-green
- Crystal habit: In radiating groups of acicular flattened or bladed needles or fibrous crusts
- Cleavage: On {100}
- Fracture: Uneven
- Mohs scale hardness: 4
- Luster: Dull to silky in aggregates
- Streak: Greenish yellow
- Diaphaneity: Transparent to translucent
- Specific gravity: 3.85
- Optical properties: Biaxial (-)
- Refractive index: n_{α} = 1.654 - 1.655 n_{β} = 1.664 - 1.667 n_{γ} = 1.664 - 1.667
- Birefringence: δ = 0.010 - 0.012
- Pleochroism: X = nearly colorless; Y = Z = yellowish green
- Other characteristics: Radioactive

Cuprosklodowskite is a secondary uranium mineral formed by alteration of earlier uranium minerals. Its empirical formula is Cu(UO_{2})_{2}(HSiO_{4})_{2}·6(H_{2}O). Cuprosklodowskite is a nesosilicate mineral, It is grass green to dark green in color, and its crystal habit is typically acicular, flat bladed crystals. It is a strongly radioactive mineral.

Cuprosklodowskite was discovered in 1933 at the Kalongwe deposit in (then) Katanga province, Belgian Congo, the type locality. It was named in the mistaken belief that the mineral was the copper analogue of sklodowskite, which in turn was named for Marie Skłodowska Curie (1867–1934).

It occurs in association with becquerelite, brochantite, uranophane, kasolite, vandenbrandeite, liebigite and compreignacite.
