= Lepersonnite-(Gd) =

Uranyl carbonate mineral

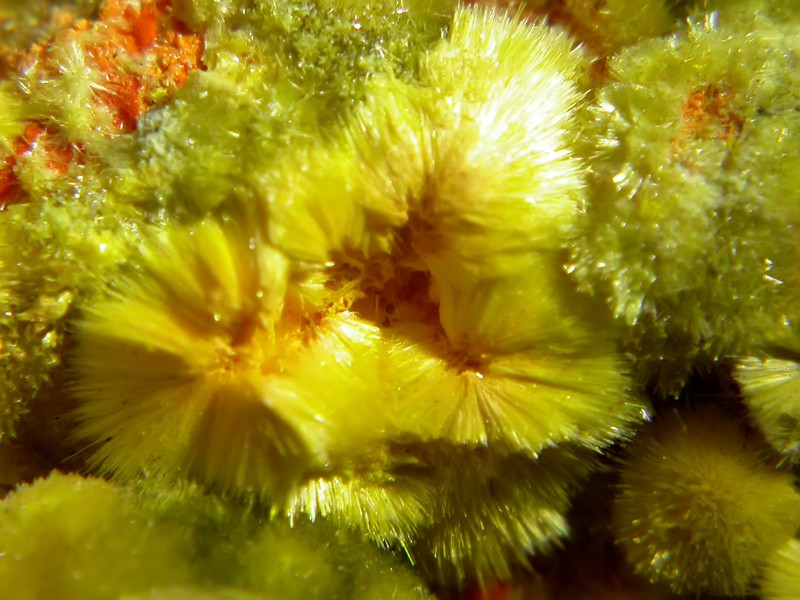
- Lepersonnite-(Gd) (flat crystals) intergrown in the yellow studtite clusters (needles) and orange curite.

General
- Category: Carbonate mineral
- Formula: Ca(Gd,Dy)_{2}(UO_{2})_{24}(SiO_{4})_{4}(CO_{3})_{8}(OH)_{24}·48H_{2}O
- IMA symbol: Lps-Gd
- Strunz classification: 5.EG.10 (10 ed); 8/B.38-10 (8 ed)
- Dana classification: 17.1.12.1
- Crystal system: Orthorhombic
- Crystal class: Pyramidal (mm2) and dipyramidal (mmm)
- Space group: Pnnm or Pnn2

Identification
- Color: Yellow (bright)
- Crystal habit: Needle-like crystals in crusts (mammilary) or spherules
- Specific gravity: Fass
- Density: 3.97 (measured)
- Optical properties: Biaxal (-)
- Refractive index: n_{α} = 1.638, n_{β} = 1.666, n_{γ} = 1.682
- 2V angle: 73° (calculated)
- Other characteristics: Radioactive

Lepersonnite-(Gd) is a very rare uranium and rare-earth mineral with the chemical formula Ca(Gd,Dy)_{2}(UO_{2})_{24}(SiO_{4})_{4}(CO_{3})_{8}(OH)_{24}·48H_{2}O. It occurs with bijvoetite-(Y) in the Shinkolobwe deposit in the Democratic Republic of the Congo, famous for rare uranium minerals. It was the first confirmed mineral with essential gadolinium and remained the only gadolinium dominant species until the description of Monazite-(Gd) in 2023.

It was first described in 1982 and is named after the Belgian geologist Jacques Lepersonne.
