= Neptunyl carbonates =

Class of chemical compounds

Neptunyl carbonates are compounds containing neptunyl (NpO^{+}_{2} or NpO^{2+}_{2}) and carbonate (CO^{2−}_{3}) ions. Frequently, these compounds will also include other cations. Due to the abundance of carbonate in natural water, they are relevant for disposal of neptunium in nuclear waste.

== Neptunyl(V) carbonates ==
=== Binary carbonates ===
While there are reports of a binary neptunyl(V) bicarbonate, NpO_{2}HCO_{3}, these results are dubious.

=== Ternary carbonates ===
Many ternary neptunyl(V) carbonates are known. One example is the compound NH_{4}NpO_{2}CO_{3}, which is precipitated from neptunium(VI) solutions by ammonium carbonate. It consists of ammonium ions sandwiched between anionic sheets made up of NpO^{+}_{2} and CO^{2−}_{3} ions. In these sheets, each neptunyl group is coordinated to three carbonate groups, and each carbonate group is coordinated to three neptunyl groups. Isostructural compounds KNpO_{2}CO_{3}, RbNpO_{2}CO_{3}, and CsNpO_{2}CO_{3}, containing potassium, rubidium, and caesium ions respectively, are also known. These compounds have space group P6_{3}/mmc and have a hexagonal structure. NH_{4}NpO_{2}CO_{3} has lattice parameters a=5.09858 and c=10.89394 Å, while KNpO_{2}CO_{3} has lattice parameters a=5.0994 and c=10.2210 Å.

Ternary neptunyl(V) carbonates containing sodium are also known. The anhydrous form of NaNpO_{2}CO_{3} has neptunyl carbonate sheets with the same structure as uranyl carbonate aka rutherfordine. Each neptunyl group is bonded to four carbonate groups, with two of them being bidentate and two of them being monodentate. It is precipitated from aqueous solutions as follows:

CO^{2−}_{3} + Na^{+} + NpO^{+}_{2} → NaNpO_{2}CO_{3}

Hydrated forms are also known, such as NaNpO_{2}CO_{3}·3H_{2}O and NaNpO_{2}CO_{3}·3.5H_{2}O. They precipitate from aqueous solution as follows:

CO^{2−}_{3} + Na^{+} + NpO^{+}_{2} + x H_{2}O → NaNpO_{2}CO_{3}·xH_{2}O

The compound NaNpO_{2}CO_{3}·3.5H_{2}O has a layered structure in the triclinic crystal system, with space group P1 and lattice parameters a=4.3420, b=4.8962, c=10.0933 Å, α=91.014°, β=77.834°, and γ=90.004°.

When NaNpO_{2}CO_{3} reacts with high concentrations of sodium carbonate, it forms the more stable solid Na_{3}NpO_{2}(CO_{3})_{2}.

A lithium double salt, LiNpO_{2}CO_{3}·2H_{2}O, has also been characterized. It consists of layers of composition [LiNpO_{2}CO_{3}H_{2}O]_{n}, along with waters of crystallization. In each layer, neptunium is bonded to three bidentate carbonate groups.

== Neptunyl(VI) carbonates ==
=== In aqueous solution ===
In aqueous solution with carbonate, neptunyl(VI) can bond to up to three carbonate ligands as in NpO_{2}(CO_{3})^{4−}_{3}. At neptunium concentrations higher than 1mM, it converts to the trinuclear species (NpO_{2})_{3}(CO_{3})^{6−}_{6}, as governed by the equation:

3 NpO_{2}(CO_{3})^{4−}_{3} → (NpO_{2})_{3}(CO_{3})^{6−}_{6} + 3 CO^{2−}_{3}

=== Binary carbonates ===
Binary neptunyl(VI) carbonate, NpO_{2}CO_{3}, can be formed by adding lithium carbonate to an acidic solution containing neptunyl(VI) nitrate. It adopts the same structure as uranyl carbonate, and has lattice parameters a=4.82, b=9.17, and c=4.24 Å.

=== Ternary carbonates ===
Neptunyl(VI) forms several ternary carbonates, many of which involve the NpO_{2}(CO_{3})^{4−}_{3} ion. These include the guanidinium salt (C(NH_{2})_{3})_{4}NpO_{2}(CO_{3})_{3}, the tetramethylammonium salt, (N(CH_{3})_{4})_{4}NpO_{2}(CO_{3})_{3}·6H_{2}O, and the caesium salt, Cs_{4}NpO_{2}(CO_{3})_{3}·8H_{2}O. In the NpO_{2}(CO_{3})^{4−}_{3} ion, the neptunyl group is surrounded by three bidentate carbonate ligands. Compounds involving sodium (Na_{4}NpO_{2}(CO_{3})_{3}), potassium (K_{4}NpO_{2}(CO_{3})_{3}), and ammonium ((NH_{4})_{4}NpO_{2}(CO_{3})_{3}) are also known, but as of 1998 their structures have not been characterized.
