= Paul Fourmarier =

Belgian geologist

- Born: 25 December 1877; La Hulpe, Province of Brabant, Belgium
- Died: 20 January 1970 (aged 92); Liège, Liège Province, Belgium
- Education: University of Liège, Wallonia, Belgium
- Known for: study of fold structures and cleavage, description the overthrust nappes
- Awards: Penrose Gold Medal (1952), Wollaston Medal (1957)
- Scientific career
- Fields: Geology, tectonics

Paul Frédéric Joseph Fourmarier (1877—1970) was a Belgian geologist and specialist in tectonics and stratigraphy, after whom the Fourmarierite mineral is named.

Fourmarier was born in La Hulpe, Province of Brabant, Belgium and studied at the University of Liège, graduating in 1899. He became a professor of geology at the university in 1920.

He won the Wollaston Medal in 1957 and the Penrose Gold Medal in 1952.

== Research ==
His specialist area was the study of fold structures and cleavage and he described the overthrust nappes in the Ardennes. Fourmarier was much involved in the geology of his native Belgium, as well as Zaire (then the Belgian Congo) and other African places. He also worked on continental drift.

== Works ==
- 1901. Le bassin dévonien et carboniférien de Theux.
- 1906. Pétrographie et paléontologie de la formation houillère de la campine, H. Vaillant-Carmanne (Liège).
- 1907. La Tectonique de l’Ardenne.
- 1916. La Tectonique du bassin houiller du Hainaut.
- 1933. Principes de géologie.
- 1934. Vue d'ensemble de la géologie de la Belgique.
- 1939. Hydrogéologie: introduction à l'étude des eaux, destinées à l'alimentation humaine et à l'industrie, Paris.
- 1954. Prodrome d'une description géologique de la Belgique. Geological Survey of Belgium, Liège, 826 p.

== Memory ==
An award named after him, the Fourmarier Prize, was established. In addition, a secondary uranium-lead mineral, fourmarierite, was named in his memory.

== See also ==
- Gaston Briart
- Jean de Heinzelin de Braucourt
- William van Leckwijck
