= Parsonsite =

Lead uranium phosphate mineral

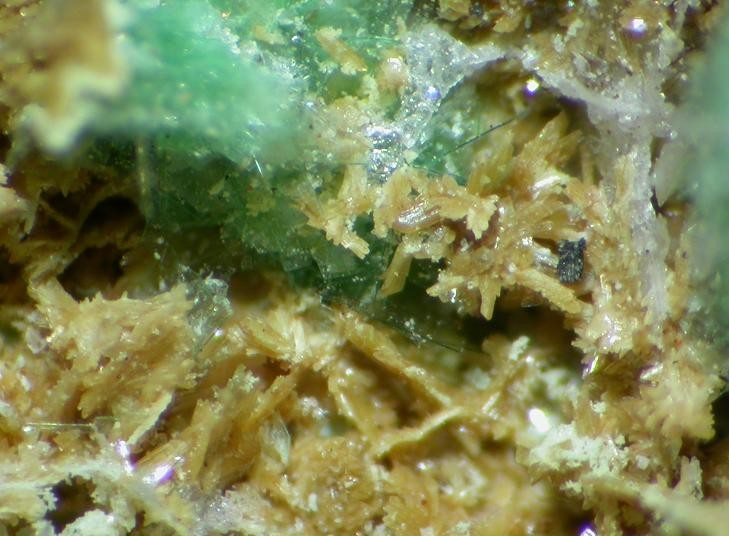
- Yellow brown parsonsite crystals with green torbernite from the Pinhal do Souto mine, Mangualde, Viseu District, Portugal

General
- Category: Phosphate mineral
- Formula: Pb_{2}(UO_{2})(PO_{4})_{2}·2H_{2}O
- IMA symbol: Pso
- Strunz classification: 8.EA.10
- Crystal system: Triclinic
- Crystal class: Pinacoidal (1̅) (same H-M symbol)
- Space group: P1̅

Identification
- Color: Pale citron-yellow
- Crystal habit: Elongate and flattened tiny crystals, may resemble laths, crusts, powdery aggregates
- Cleavage: None observed
- Mohs scale hardness: 2.5-3
- Luster: Sub-adamantine
- Diaphaneity: Transparent to translucent
- Specific gravity: 5.37
- Optical properties: Pale yellow color
- Pleochroism: None
- Ultraviolet fluorescence: Does not fluoresce in UV light
- Solubility: Soluble in acids
- Other characteristics: Radioactive

Parsonsite is a lead uranium phosphate mineral with chemical formula: Pb_{2}(UO_{2})(PO_{4})_{2}·2H_{2}O. Parsonsite contains about 45% lead and 25% uranium. It forms elongated lathlike pseudo monoclinic crystals, radial spherulites, encrustations and powdery aggregates. It is of a light yellow colour. It has a Mohs hardness of 2.5-3 and a specific gravity of 5.72 - 6.29.

It was first described in 1923 for an occurrence in the Shinkolobwe mine, Katanga Copper Crescent, Democratic Republic of Congo. It was named for mineralogist Arthur Leonard Parsons (1873–1957) of the University of Toronto, Canada.

== Bibliography ==
- Palache, P.; Berman H.; Frondel, C. (1960). "Dana's System of Mineralogy, Volume II: Halides, Nitrates, Borates, Carbonates, Sulfates, Phosphates, Arsenates, Tungstates, Molybdates, Etc. (Seventh Edition)" John Wiley and Sons, Inc., New York, pp. 913-914.
