= Jean de Heinzelin de Braucourt =

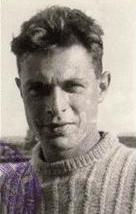
de Heinzelin, c. 1941

Jean de Heinzelin de Braucourt (6 August 1920 – 4 November 1998) was a Belgian geologist who worked mainly in Africa. He worked at the universities of Ghent and Brussels. He gained international fame in 1950 when he discovered the Ishango Bone

"Jean de Heinzelin was a geologist. A kind of a modern adventurer, Jean de Heinzelin was a field worker and a remarkable observer.

Africa was his main area of work, but he also took part in various expeditions in Europe, the United States and the Middle East.

From 1946 onward, he was associated with the Royal Belgian Institute for Natural Sciences. At the Universities of Ghent and Brussels, he imparted his knowledge enthusiastically to students.

A chance in his career - the Ishango Bone discovery - brought him international fame."

A consistent voice of empiricism and reason in African paleoecology, Dr. Heinzelin made many contributions to the understanding of how geology can inform about the history and prehistory of tropical landscapes. Many of his original conclusions are still valid, especially his interpretation of the humid tropical fluvial origin of sand and gravel sediments in Central Africa that are still wrongly attributed to desert processes (e.g., J. Runge 2007).<Des déserts et des forêts, histoire du paysage et du climat de l'Afrique Centrale au Quaternaire Supérieur. Geo-Eco-Trop 31: 1-18/>.

== See also ==
- Gaston Briart
- Paul Fourmarier
- William van Leckwijck
