= Masuyite =

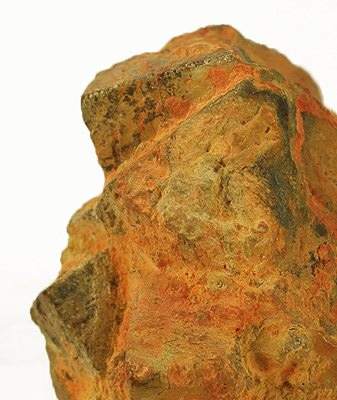
- Orange Masuyite coating crystals of cubic uraninite (to about 1 cm). Shinkolobwe mine, the type locality, Democratic Republic of the Congo.

General
- Category: Oxide minerals
- Formula: Pb[(UO_{2})_{3}O_{3}(OH)_{2}]·3H_{2}O
- IMA symbol: Msy
- Strunz classification: 4.GB.35
- Crystal system: Monoclinic
- Crystal class: Domatic (m) (same H-M symbol)
- Space group: Pn
- Unit cell: a = 13.98 Å, b = 12.11 Å, c = 14.2 Å; Z = 2

Identification
- Optical properties: Biaxial (-)
- Refractive index: n_{α} = 1.785 n_{β} = 1.895 n_{γ} = 1.915
- Birefringence: δ = 0.130
- 2V angle: Measured: 50°, calculated: 44°
- Dispersion: extreme
- Other characteristics: Radioactive
- References: Masuyite on Mineralienatlas

Masuyite is a uranium/lead oxide mineral with formula Pb[(UO_{2})_{3}O_{3}(OH)_{2}]·3H_{2}O.

Masuyite was first described in 1947 for an occurrence in Katanga and named to honor Belgian geologist Gustave Masuy (1905–1945).

== See also ==
- Classification of minerals
- List of minerals
