= William van Leckwijck =

Belgian geologist (1902–1975)

William van Leckwijck (16 November 1902 – 19 June 1975) was a Belgian mining engineer and geologist. He worked as surveyor and consultant across Europe for mining companies and became a professor at the University of Leuven from 1964. He served as an editor of the Lexique Stratigraphique International and became a secretary general of the International Union of Geological Sciences.

Van Leckwijck was born in Antwerp but the family moved to England at the onset of World War I. Educated in Clifton College, Bristol, and at the University of Edinburgh, he then graduated as a mining engineer at the University of Liège in 1926. He then worked on geological surveys, mainly for coal, in Canada and Britain. He then worked across Europe and North Africa and conducted surveys for a while at Société Ougrée-Marihaye during World War II. He became a paleontologist at the University of Liège in 1943. In 1964 he succeeded Theodor Sorgenfrei (1915–1972) as professor of paleontology at the Catholic University of Leuven where he established micropaleontology.

== See also ==
- Gaston Briart
- Jean de Heinzelin de Braucourt
- Paul Fourmarier
