= Briartite =

Metallic sulfide mineral

General
- Category: Minerals
- Formula: Cu_{2}(Fe,Zn)GeS_{4}
- IMA symbol: Btt
- Strunz classification: 02.KA.10(02)
- Dana classification: 2.9.2.3.(02)
- Crystal system: Tetragonal
- Space group: 07;10
- Unit cell: 297.46 Å³

Identification
- Colour: Gray to gray blue; Iron-grey
- Twinning: Polysynthetic
- Mohs scale hardness: 3.5–4.5
- Luster: Metallic; Unpolished
- Diaphaneity: Opaque
- Specific gravity: 4.337 (Calculated)
- Density: 4.337 g/cm3 (Calculated)
- Common impurities: Ga, Sn

Briartite is an opaque iron-grey metallic sulfide mineral, Cu_{2}(Zn,Fe)GeS_{4} with traces of Ga and Sn, found as inclusions in other germanium-gallium-bearing sulfides.

It was discovered at the Prince Léopold Mine, Kipushi, Shaba, Congo (Léopoldville) in 1965 by Francotte and others, and named for Gaston Briart who had studied formations at Kipushi.

Briartite is also found in Namibia, Greece, and Spain.

== See also ==
- List of minerals
- List of minerals named after people
