= Gaston Briart =

Belgian geologist

Gaston Briart was a Belgian geologist and mining engineer who worked and studied rock formations at Prince Léopold mine, Kipushi, Katanga, Democratic Republic of the Congo.

The mineral Briartite, discovered in Kipushi in 1965, is named in his honour.

== See also ==
- Jean de Heinzelin de Braucourt
- Paul Fourmarier
- William van Leckwijck
