= Billietite =

Uncommon mineral of uranium that contains barium

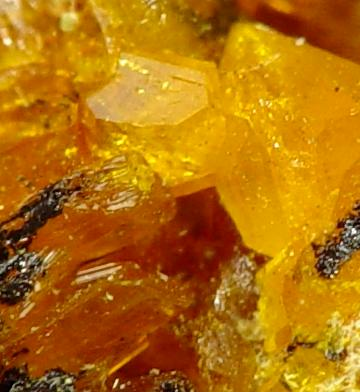
- Becquerelite (yellow) and billietite (orange)

General
- Category: Oxide minerals
- Formula: Ba(UO_{2})_{6}O_{4}(OH)_{6}•8H_{2}O
- IMA symbol: Bil
- Strunz classification: 4.GB.10
- Dana classification: 5.7.1.3
- Crystal system: Orthorhombic
- Crystal class: Pyramidal (mm2) (same H-M symbol)
- Space group: Pbn2_{1}

Identification
- Color: Yellow to golden-yellow, amber-yellow, orange-yellow
- Cleavage: Perfect on {001}, imperfect on {110} and {010}
- Tenacity: Brittle
- Luster: Adamantine
- Diaphaneity: Transparent, translucent
- Density: 5.28 - 5.36 g/cm^{3}
- Other characteristics: Radioactive

Billietite is an uncommon mineral of uranium that contains barium. It has the chemical formula: Ba(UO_{2})_{6}O_{4}(OH)_{6}•8H_{2}O. It usually occurs as clear yellow orthorhombic crystals. Billietite is named after Valere Louis Billiet (1903–1945), Belgian crystallographer at the University of Ghent, Ghent, Belgium.

Billietite was discovered in the locality of the Shinkolobwe uranium mine in the Haut-Katanga Province of the Democratic Republic of the Congo (DRC).
