= Wyartite =

Uranium bearing crystal

General
- Category: Carbonate minerals
- Formula: CaU^{5+}(UO_{2})_{2}(CO_{3})O_{4}(OH)·7H_{2}O
- IMA symbol: Wya
- Strunz classification: 5.EA.15
- Crystal system: Orthorhombic
- Crystal class: Disphenoidal (222); Space group: (222)
- Space group: P2_{1}2_{1}2_{1}

Identification
- Color: black, violet-black (fresh); yellowish brown, greenish brown (exposed)
- Luster: vitreous, sub-metallic, dull
- Diaphaneity: transparent, translucent, opaque
- Other characteristics: Radioactive

Wyartite CaU^{5+}(UO_{2})_{2}(CO_{3})O_{4}(OH)·7H_{2}O is a uranium bearing mineral named after Jean Wyart (1902–1992), mineralogist at the Sorbonne, Paris. It has greenish-black, black, or violet-black, translucent to opaque orthorhombic crystals. It has a hardness of 3 to 4 on the Mohs scale. Its other names are ianthinite (of Bignand), wyartit and wyartita. It belongs to the uranium carbonate group of minerals. It is found next to rutherfordine in Shinkolobwe, Shaba, Zaire.

Determination of the structure of wyartite provided the first evidence for a pentavalent uranium mineral. Like all uranium minerals it is radioactive.
