= Schoepite =

Mineral

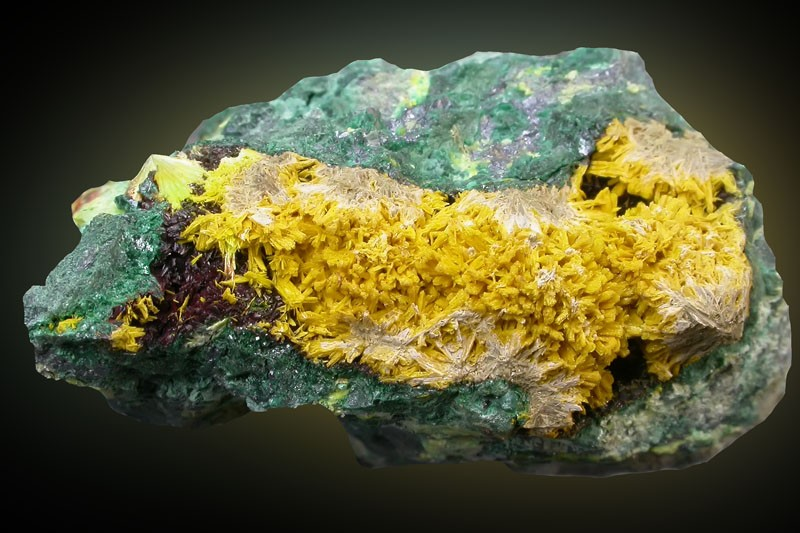

General
- Category: Uranium minerals
- Formula: (UO_{2})_{8}O_{2}(OH)_{12} • 12(H_{2}O)
- IMA symbol: Sho
- Strunz classification: 4.GA.05
- Crystal system: Orthorhombic
- Crystal class: Pyramidal (mm2); H-M symbol: (mm2)
- Space group: P2_{1}ca
- Unit cell: a = 14.33 Å, b = 16.79 Å c = 14.73 Å; Z = 4

Identification
- Color: Amber, lemon- or sulfur yellow
- Crystal habit: Commonly as tabular equant, to short prismatic crystals; rarely in microcrystalline aggregates
- Cleavage: [001] Perfect, [010] indistinct
- Tenacity: Brittle
- Mohs scale hardness: 2.5
- Luster: Adamantine
- Streak: Yellow
- Diaphaneity: Transparent to translucent
- Specific gravity: 4.8
- Optical properties: Biaxial (−)
- Refractive index: n_{α} = 1.690 n_{β} = 1.714 n_{γ} = 1.735
- Birefringence: δ = 0.045
- Pleochroism: X = almost colorless; Y = Z = lemon-yellow to golden yellow
- 2V angle: Measured: 89°
- Ultraviolet fluorescence: Short and long UV = pale green
- Other characteristics: Radioactive

Schoepite, empirical formula (UO_{2})_{8}O_{2}(OH)_{12}·12(H_{2}O) is a rare alteration product of uraninite in hydrothermal uranium deposits. It may also form directly from ianthinite. The mineral presents as a transparent to translucent yellow, lemon yellow, brownish yellow, or amber orthorhombic tabular crystals. Although over 20 other crystal forms have been noted; rarely in microcrystalline aggregates. When exposed to air schoepite converts over a short time to the metaschoepite form (UO_{3}·nH_{2}O, n < 2) within a few months of being exposed to ambient air.

The hardness is 2.5, density is 4.8 g/cm^{3}, and it streaks yellow.

It was first described from specimens from Shinkolobwe mine in Belgian Congo in 1923, several additional localities are known.

Schoepite was named to honor Alfred Schoep (1881–1966), Professor of Mineralogy at the University of Ghent, Belgium.
