= Kasolite =

Lead uranyl silicate monohydrate mineral

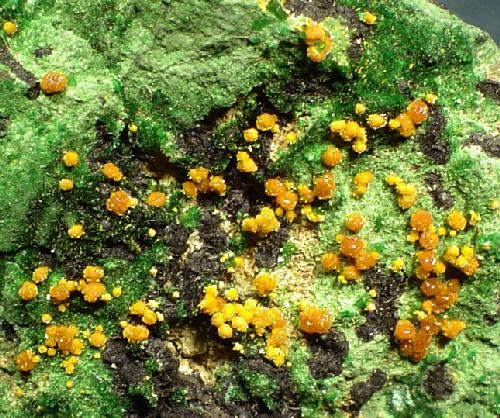
- Kasolite and malachite from Musonoi mine, Democratic Republic of Congo

General
- Category: Minerals
- Formula: Pb(UO_{2})(SiO_{4}) · H_{2}O
- IMA symbol: Kso
- Strunz classification: 09.AK.15
- Dana classification: 53.03.01.01
- Crystal system: Monoclinic
- Crystal class: Prismatic; H-M symbol: 2/m
- Space group: P 2_{1}/a
- Unit cell: 596.48

Identification
- Formula mass: 587.33
- Color: Reddish orange, yellow, yellow brown, green, gray green
- Cleavage: Perfect on {001} Good on {010}, {100}
- Fracture: Uneven
- Tenacity: Brittle
- Mohs scale hardness: 4 - 5
- Luster: Resinous, Greasy
- Streak: Light brownish yellow
- Diaphaneity: Transparent, translucent, opaque
- Specific gravity: 5.83 - 6.5
- Density: Measured: 5.83 - 6.5; Calculated: 6.256
- Optical properties: Biaxial (+)
- Refractive index: n_{α} = 1.890 n_{β} = 1.910 n_{γ} = 1.950
- Birefringence: 0.060
- Pleochroism: Weak; X =Y = Pale yellow Z = Colorless to slightly grayish
- 2V angle: Measured: 43° Calculated: 72°
- Dispersion: Strong
- Ultraviolet fluorescence: Radioactive
- Common impurities: As, P, Ba, Fe, Mg, Ca
- Other characteristics: Radioactive

Kasolite is an uncommon lead uranyl silicate monohydrate mineral. It is an IMA approved mineral, that had been a valid species before the foundation of the association, that had been first described and published in 1921 by Schoep. It is a grandfathered mineral, meaning the name kasolite is still believed to refer to a valid species to this day. The mineral's name originates from its type locality, namely the Shinkolobwe Mine, also known as Kasolo Mine. Kasolite is possibly the lead analogue of the unnamed phase UM1956-02-SiO:CaHU, and it is the only accepted lead-uranium silicate.

== Visual properties ==
Kasolite occurs in prismatic, lath-like crystals. It typically forms either clusters of radial acicular crystals, microcrystals, or a coating on top of the altered specimens. Individual crystals can grow up to a few millimeters. Massive specimens tend to have a dull to earthy luster. Kasolite is a weakly pleochroic mineral, which is an optical phenomenon. The mineral's color seems to be changing depending on the axis it is inspected on. On the X and Y axes, it appears in a pale yellow color, while on the Z, it can have a colorless to slightly grayish coloration.

== Chemical properties ==
Kasolite mainly consists of uranium (40.53%), lead (35.28%) and oxygen (19.07%), but otherwise contains silicon (4.78%) and a small amount of hydrogen (0.34%). It has a very strong, 2,893,809.61 radioactivity measured in Gamma Ray American Petroleum Institute Units caused by its uranium concentration. Typically it can have arsenic, potassium, barium, iron, magnesium and calcium impurities. The crystal structure has a strong hydrogen bonding, where the water molecules are distributed in pairs, held together by two symmetrically related hydrogen bonds. It is further described to have formed from uranyl silicate layers having the uranophane sheet anion-topology. Water molecules are in the lead interlayer ions' coordination structure and reinforce it with hydrogen bonding between the uranyl silicate sheets. Its crystal structure is described as mechanically stable and very isotropic, which is unexpected as layered structures tend to be very anisotropic. Its large mechanical isotropy can be explained due to the strong dual hydrogen bonding between the uranyl silicate sheets. Because of the hydrogen bonding, the bonding strength along the direction perpendicular to sheets and that along the other directions are similar.

== Formation ==
Carbonate and fluoride complexes play a major role in the formation of the mineral. Hydrothermal solutions reacting with uranium-bearing metamictized minerals form uranous fluoride complexes. These complexes are predominant at pH 4 and in reducing atmosphere. As the fluids pass through fractures, approaching the surface, the pH and the oxygen fugacity increases due to the loss of volatile components. Under these conditions, the uranous fluorides go through metamorphosis, becoming uranyl fluoride complexes. The fluorine ion activity decays due to the precipitation of fluorite and the dilution of the hydrothermal solutions, which both contribute to temperature decrease. When these conditions meet, uranyl-carbonate complexes are favored, which, when they combine with lead and silica, form kasolite. As lead is neither radiogenic nor a uranium substitute, the source of lead in the mineral structure might originate from galena's mineralization.

== Occurrences and localities ==
Kasolite is an oxidation product of uraninite. This is the reason why it can usually be found in oxidized uranium deposits. In Kasolo, Congo, the mineral occurs in association with torbernite, curite, dewindtite and uraninite, and in Nabarlek, Australia, it can be found in association with rutherfordine, sklodowskite and curite as well. The top distributors of the mineral are Congo, Gabon, Germany, England, France, Australia, Canada, Mexico and the United States, however, there are numerous minor distributors as well.
