= Studtite =

Uranyl peroxide mineral

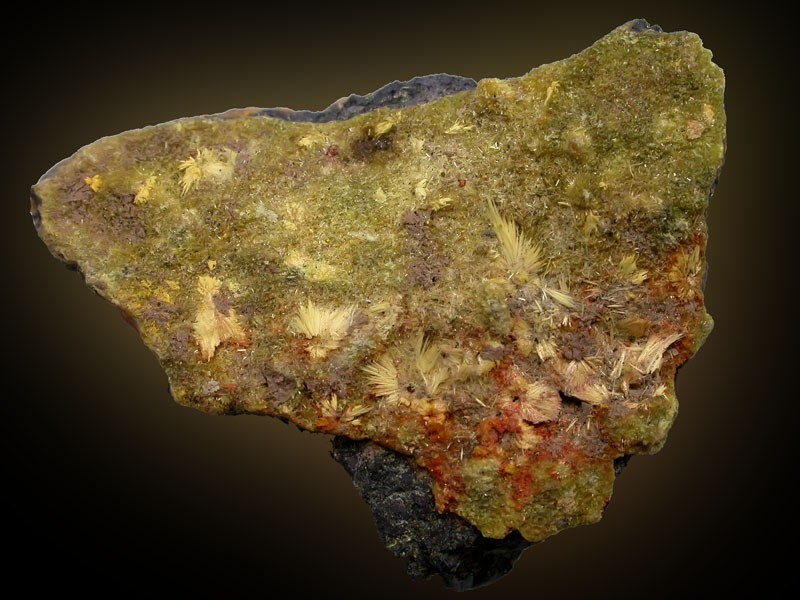

General
- Category: Oxide mineral
- Formula: UO_{2}O_{2}·4(H_{2}O)
- IMA symbol: Stu
- Strunz classification: 4.GA.15; Uranyl hydroxides
- Dana classification: 05.03.01.01
- Crystal system: Monoclinic
- Crystal class: Prismatic (2/m) (same H-M symbol)
- Space group: C2/m

Identification
- Color: Yellow to pale yellow; nearly colorless in transmitted light
- Crystal habit: Needlelike crystals in radial fibrous aggregates and crusts
- Tenacity: Flexible
- Mohs scale hardness: 1 – 2
- Luster: Vitreous, waxy
- Streak: Light yellow
- Diaphaneity: Translucent
- Specific gravity: 3.58
- Optical properties: Biaxial (+)
- Refractive index: n_{α} = 1.545 n_{β} = 1.555 n_{γ} = 1.680
- Birefringence: δ = 0.135
- Ultraviolet fluorescence: Non-fluorescent
- Alters to: Dehydrates to metastudtite
- Other characteristics: Radioactive

Studtite, chemical formula [(UO_{2})O_{2}(H_{2}O)_{2}]·2(H_{2}O) or UO_{4}·4(H_{2}O), is a secondary uranium mineral containing peroxide produced by the alpha-radiolysis of water during its formation. It occurs as pale yellow to white needle-like crystals often in acicular, white sprays.

Vaes initially described studtite in 1947 from specimens from Shinkolobwe, Katanga Copper Crescent, Katanga (Shaba), Democratic Republic of Congo, and has since been reported from several other localities. The mineral was named for Franz Edward Studt, an English prospector and geologist who authored the first geological map of Katanga in 1913.

When exposed to air, or heated at 70 °C, studtite partially dehydrates, losing two water molecules, and converts over a short time to the metastudtite UO_{4}·2(H_{2}O) form. Despite their apparent chemical simplicity, these two uranyl species are the only reported peroxide minerals.

They may also be readily formed on the surface of nuclear waste under long-term storage and have been found on the surface of spent nuclear fuel stored at the Hanford, Washington nuclear site. It has also been reported that studtite has since formed on the corium lavas that were created during the course of the Chernobyl nuclear plant accident. Thus, there is considerable evidence that uranyl peroxides such as studtite and metastudtite will be important alteration phases of nuclear waste, possibly at the expense of other minerals, such as uranyl oxides and silicates, which have been more thoroughly studied and are better understood. The formation of these minerals may impact the long-term performance of deep geological repository sites such as Yucca Mountain nuclear waste repository. Due to insufficient information about these minerals it is unknown if they will make radioactive wastes more or less stable, but the presence of studtite and metastudtite provides a pathway for mobilizing insoluble U(IV) from the corroding fuel surface into soluble uranyl species.
