= Vandenbrandeite =

Oxide mineral

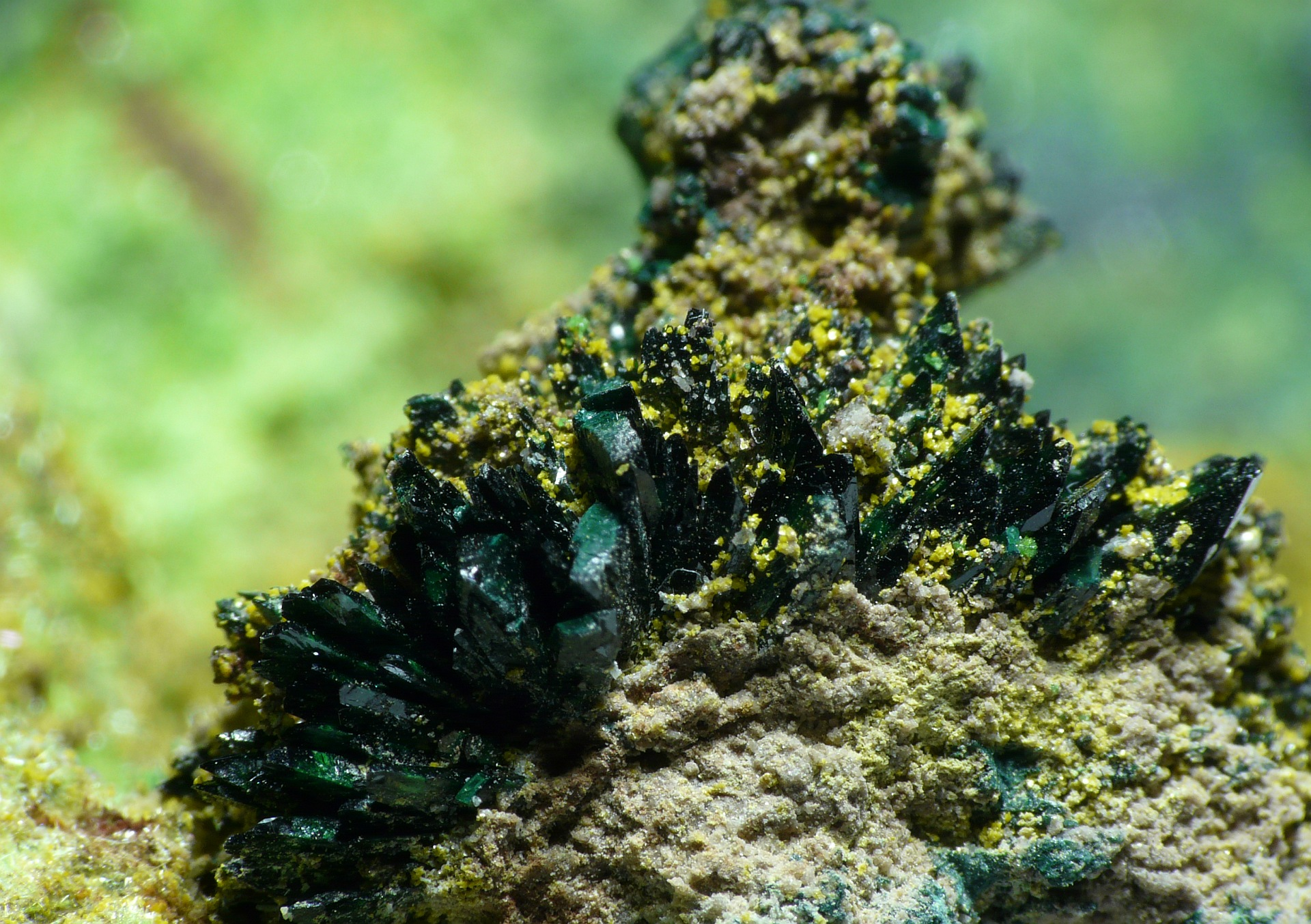

General
- Category: Minerals
- Formula: Cu(UO_{2})(OH)_{4}
- IMA symbol: Vbd
- Strunz classification: 04.GB.45
- Dana classification: 05.03.02.01
- Crystal system: Triclinic
- Crystal class: Triclinic-Pinacoidal
- Space group: P1̅
- Unit cell: 254.99 Å³

Identification
- Color: Blackish green to dark green with bluish green tint
- Cleavage: Perfect on {001}, {110} Distinct and also indisctinct in the [001] zone
- Fracture: None
- Tenacity: Brittle
- Mohs scale hardness: 4
- Luster: Vitreous, sub-vitreous, greasy
- Streak: Green
- Diaphaneity: Transparent, translucent
- Specific gravity: 5.03
- Density: 5.03
- Optical properties: Biaxial (-)
- Refractive index: n_{α} = 1.765 - 1.770 n_{β} = 1.780 - 1.792 n_{γ} = 1.800
- Birefringence: 0.035
- Pleochroism: Visible
- 2V angle: Measured 90° Calculated 60°- 88°
- Dispersion: Visible to strong
- Ultraviolet fluorescence: None
- Other characteristics: Radioactive

Vandenbrandeite is a mineral named after a Belgian geologist, Pierre Van den Brande, who discovered an ore deposit. It was named in 1932, and has been a valid mineral ever since then.

== Properties ==
Vandenbrandeite grows in microcrystals, up to half a millimeter. It may be rounded or lathlike. The crystals are flattened on {001}. It grows in parallel aggregates, in a lamellar, scaly shape. It is tabular, meaning its dimensions in one direction are weak. It is a pleochroic mineral. Depending on the axis the mineral is seen, the color of it changes, which is an optical phenomenon. It appears blue-green on the x-axis and yellow-green on the z-axis. It is highly stable in the presence of both water and hydrogen peroxide. Vandenbrandeite, due to being strongly radioactive, is usually closely associated with other radioactive minerals. Its radioactive properties are due to its composition. The mineral is made out of 59.27% uranium, which is the main component of the mineral. It has a GRapi (Gamma Ray American Petroleum Institute Units) of 4,352,567.33. It has a concentration of 229.75 measured in GRapi. Other chemical elements included in vandenbrandeite are oxygen (23.9%), copper (15.82%) and hydrogen (1%). Although it is radioactive, the mineral is not fluorescent. It is a secondary mineral.
