= Soddyite =

Mineral of uranium

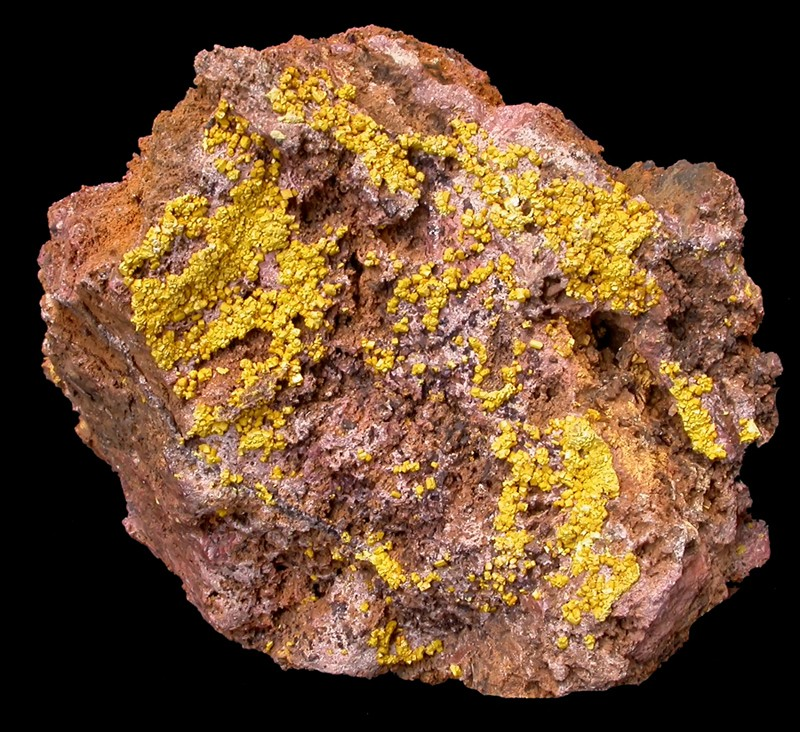
- A piece of rock from Swambo in the Democratic Republic of Congo containing yellow crystals of soddyite

General
- Category: Nesosilicates
- Formula: (UO_{2})_{2}SiO_{4}·2H_{2}O
- IMA symbol: Sod
- Strunz classification: 9.AK.05
- Dana classification: 53.03.03.01
- Crystal system: Orthorhombic
- Crystal class: Dipyramidal (mmm); H-M symbol: (2/m 2/m 2/m)
- Space group: F ddd
- Unit cell: 1,745.03 Å³

Identification
- Color: Canary yellow to amber yellow
- Cleavage: Perfect on {001}, good on {111}
- Mohs scale hardness: 3 - 4
- Luster: Vitreous, greasy, dull
- Streak: Yellow
- Diaphaneity: Transparent, translucent, opaque
- Density: 4.627
- Optical properties: Biaxial (-)
- Refractive index: n_{α} = 1.650 - 1.654, n_{β} = 1.685, n_{γ} = 1.699 - 1.715
- Birefringence: 0.049 - 0.061
- Dispersion: Relatively weak
- Ultraviolet fluorescence: Weak orange yellow
- Other characteristics: Radioactive

Soddyite is a mineral of uranium. It has yellow crystals and usually mixed with curite in oxidized uranium ores. It is named after the British radiochemist and physicist Frederick Soddy (1877–1956). Soddyite has been a valid species since 1922, following its discovery in the locality of the Shinkolobwe uranium mine in the Haut-Katanga Province of the Democratic Republic of the Congo (DRC).
