= Becquerelite =

Uranium mineral

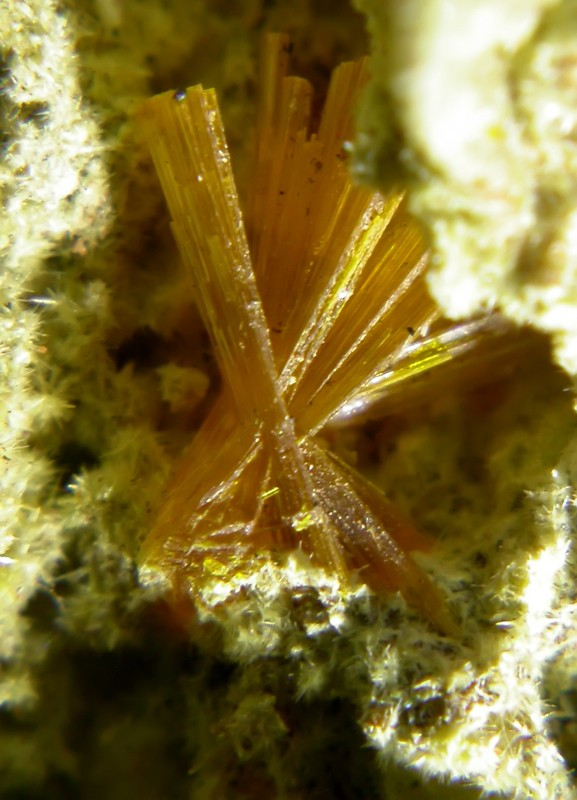
- Spray of becquerelite crystals with uranophane needles from the old Shinkolobwe mine

General
- Category: Oxide mineral
- Formula: Ca(UO_{2})_{6}O_{4}(OH)_{6}·8(H_{2}O)
- IMA symbol: Bqr
- Strunz classification: 4.GB.10
- Crystal system: Orthorhombic
- Crystal class: Pyramidal (mm2); H-M symbol: (mm2)
- Space group: Pn2_{1}a
- Unit cell: a = 13.8378 Å, b = 12.3781 Å, c = 14.9238 Å; Z = 4

Identification
- Colour: Amber-yellow, golden to lemon-yellow, yellow-orange, brownish yellow
- Crystal habit: Tabular prismatic striated crystals exhibiting pseudohexagonal outline; coatings and fine-grained aggregates
- Cleavage: Perfect on {001}; imperfect on {101}, {010} and {110}
- Tenacity: Brittle
- Mohs scale hardness: 2.5
- Lustre: Adamantine to greasy
- Streak: Yellow
- Diaphaneity: Transparent
- Specific gravity: 5.09–5.2
- Optical properties: Biaxial (−)
- Refractive index: n_{α} = 1.725 – 1.735 n_{β} = 1.815 – 1.825 n_{γ} = 1.825 – 1.830
- Birefringence: δ = 0.100
- Pleochroism: X = colourless to pale yellow, Y = Z = yellow to deep yellow
- 2V angle: Measured: 32°
- Common impurities: Commonly contains lead
- Other characteristics: Radioactive

Becquerelite is a uranium mineral with the chemical formula: Ca(UO_{2})_{6}O_{4}(OH)_{6}·8(H_{2}O). It is a secondary mineral which contains calcium and is a bright yellow colour. It has a Mohs hardness of about 2.

It was named after the French physicist Antoine Henri Becquerel (1852–1908), who discovered radioactivity in 1896. Becquerelite contains about 70% uranium by weight.

It is mainly mined in Kasolo of the former Zaire, in the present day Democratic Republic of the Congo.
