= Uranophane =

Rare calcium uranium silicate hydrate mineral

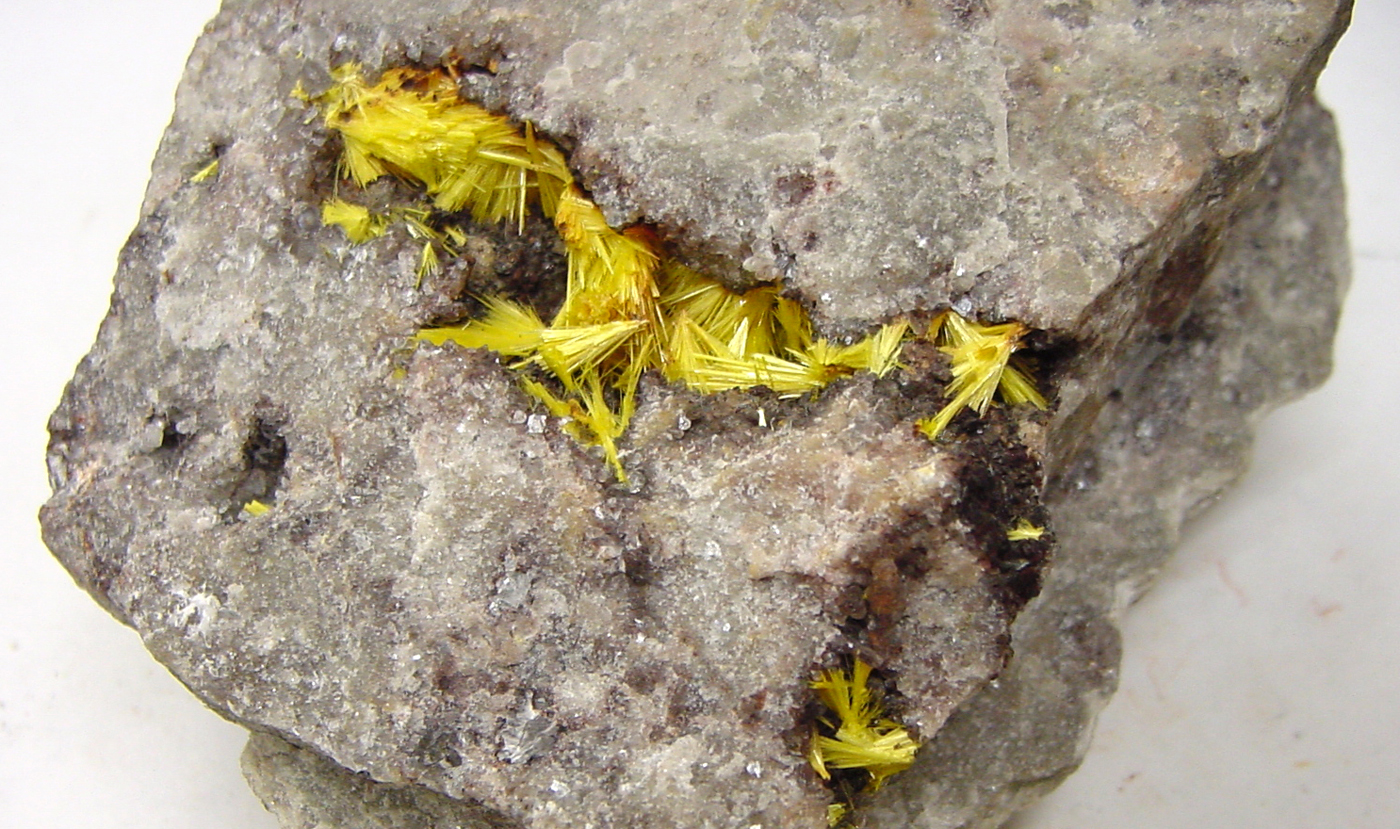

General
- Category: Uranyl neso- and polysilicates
- Formula: Ca(UO_{2})_{2}[HSiO_{4}]_{2}·5H_{2}O
- IMA symbol: Urp-α
- Strunz classification: 9.AK.15
- Crystal system: Monoclinic
- Crystal class: Sphenoidal (2) (same H-M symbol)
- Space group: P2_{1}
- Unit cell: a = 15.85 Å, b = 6.98 Å c = 6.64 Å; β = 97.45°; Z = 2

Identification
- Formula mass: 586.36 g/mol
- Color: Light yellow, lemon-yellow, honey-yellow, straw-yellow, green-yellow
- Crystal habit: Crystals occur as stellate needle aggregates; as fibrous crusts, and massive
- Cleavage: {100} Perfect
- Fracture: Uneven
- Tenacity: Brittle
- Mohs scale hardness: 2.5
- Luster: Vitreous to pearly; waxy or dull when massive
- Streak: Yellowish white
- Diaphaneity: Translucent to subtranslucent
- Specific gravity: 3.81–3.90
- Optical properties: Biaxial (−)
- Refractive index: n_{α} = 1.643 n_{β} = 1.666 n_{γ} = 1.669
- Birefringence: δ = 0.026
- Pleochroism: Weak; X = colorless; Y = pale canary-yellow; Z = canary-yellow
- 2V angle: 32° to 45°, measured
- Ultraviolet fluorescence: Weak yellow-green under both short and long UV
- Other characteristics: Radioactive

Uranophane (Ca(UO_{2})_{2}(SiO_{3}OH)_{2}·5H_{2}O), also known as uranotile, is a rare calcium uranium silicate hydrate mineral that forms from the oxidation of other uranium-bearing minerals. It has a yellow color and is radioactive.

Alice Mary Weeks, and Mary E. Thompson of the United States Geological Survey, identified uranophane in 1953.

Classic samples have been produced at Madawaska Mine near Bancroft, Ontario.

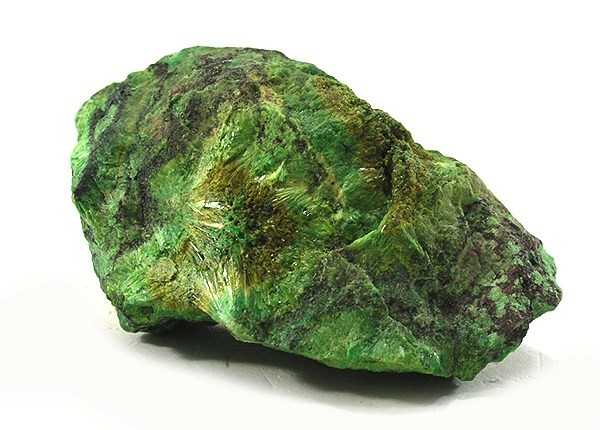
Cuprosklodowskite (green) altering to Uranophane (yellow needles). Musonoi Mine, Kolwezi, Katanga, Democratic Republic of Congo
