= Fourmarierite =

Mineral

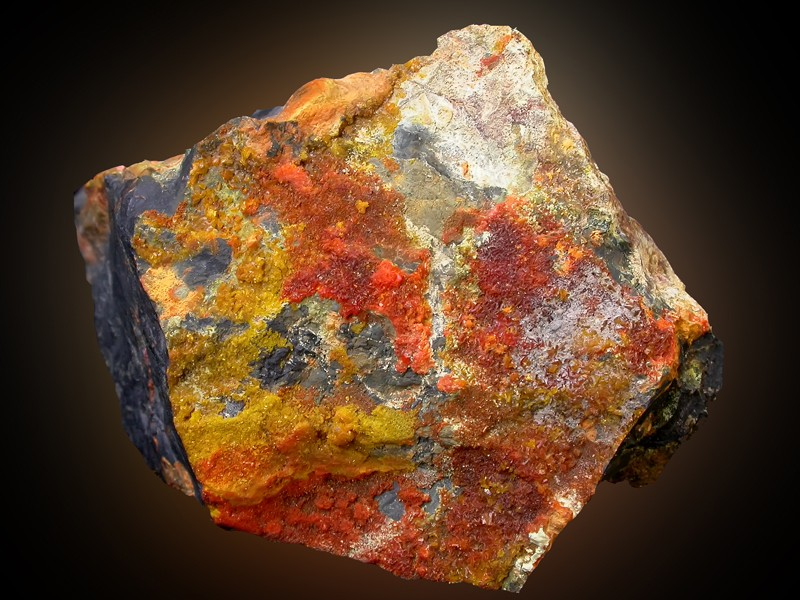

General
- Category: Oxide minerals
- Formula: Pb(UO_{2})_{4}O_{3}(OH)_{4}•4H_{2}O
- IMA symbol: Fmr
- Strunz classification: 4.GB.25
- Crystal system: Orthorhombic
- Crystal class: Pyramidal (mm2); H-M Symbol: (mm2)
- Space group: Bb2_{1}m

Identification
- Color: Red, golden-red, brown
- Cleavage: On {001}, perfect
- Mohs scale hardness: 3 - 4
- Luster: Adamantine
- Diaphaneity: Transparent
- Density: 6.046 g/cm^{3}
- Other characteristics: Radioactive

Fourmarierite is a secondary uranium-lead mineral. It was named for the Belgian geologist Paul Fourmarier (1877–1970). Its chemical formula is Pb(UO_{2})_{4}O_{3}(OH)_{4}•4H_{2}O.
