= Uranyl =

Oxycation of uranium

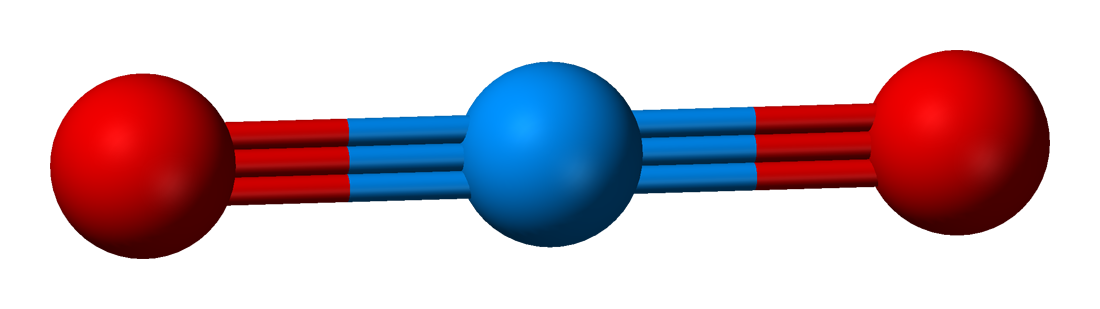
Ball-and-stick model of UO^{2+}_{2}

The uranyl ion, showing the U–O bond order of 3

The uranyl ion is an oxycation of uranium having the formula UO^{2+}_{2}; it is the most common form of uranium(VI). Uranyl is linear with two short U–O bonds of 180 picometers. Some important uranyl compounds are uranyl nitrate and several uranyl chlorides.

== Structure and bonding ==
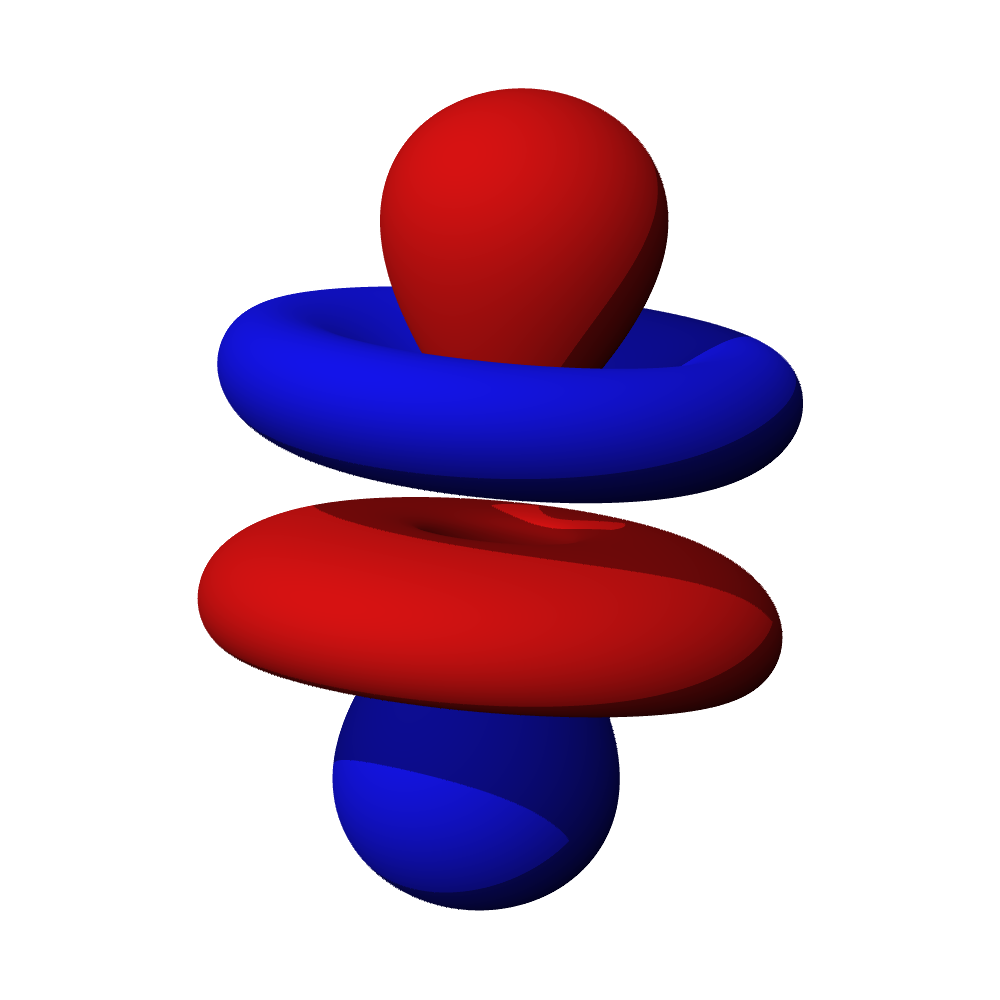
f_{z^{3}} orbital

The uranyl ion is linear and symmetrical, specifically belonging to the D_{∞h} point group, having both U–O bond lengths about 180 pm. The bond lengths are indicative of the presence of multiple bonding between the uranium and oxygen atoms. Since uranium(VI) has the electronic configuration of the preceding noble gas, radon, the electrons used in forming the U–O bonds are supplied by the oxygen atoms. The electrons are donated into empty atomic orbitals on the uranium atom. The empty orbitals of lowest energy are 7s, 5f and 6d. In terms of valence bond theory, the sigma bonds may be formed using d_{z^{2}} and f_{z^{3}} to construct sd, sf and df hybrid orbitals (the z-axis passes through the oxygen atoms). (d_{xz}, d_{yz}) and (f_{xz^{2}} and f_{yz^{2}}) may be used to form pi bonds. Since the pair of d or f orbitals used in bonding are doubly degenerate, this equates to an overall bond order of three.

Structure of uranyl nitrate dihydrate (UO_{2}(H_{2}O)_{2}(NO_{3})_{2}). In the uranyl group, the O=U=O angle is linear. In the equatorial plane of the complex are six U-O bonds to bidentate nitrate and two water ligands. At 245-151 pm, these U-O bonds are much longer than the U=O bonds of the uranyl center.

The uranyl ion is always associated with other ligands. The most common arrangement is for the so-called equatorial ligands to lie in a plane perpendicular to the O–U–O line and passing through the uranium atom. With four ligands, as in [UO_{2}Cl_{4}]^{2−}, the uranium has a distorted octahedral environment. In many cases more than four ligands occupy the equator.

In uranyl fluoride, UO_{2}F_{2}, the uranium atom achieves a coordination number of 8 by forming a layer structure with two oxygen atoms in a uranyl configuration and six fluoride ions bridging between uranyl groups. A similar structure is found in α-uranium trioxide, with oxygen in place of fluoride, except that in that case the layers are connected by sharing oxygen atom from "uranyl groups", which are identified by having relatively short U–O distances. A similar structure occurs in some uranates, such as calcium uranate, CaUO_{4}, which may be written as Ca(UO_{2})O_{2} even though the structure does not contain isolated uranyl groups.

== Spectroscopy ==
The colour of uranyl compounds is due to ligand-to-metal charge transfer transitions at ca. 420 nm, on the blue edge of the visible spectrum. The exact location of the absorption band and NEXAFS bands depends on the nature of the equatorial ligands. Compounds containing the uranyl ion are usually yellow, though some compounds are red, orange or green.

Uranyl compounds also exhibit luminescence. The first study of the green luminescence of uranium glass, by Brewster in 1849, began extensive studies of the spectroscopy of the uranyl ion. Detailed understanding of this spectrum was obtained 130 years later. It is now well-established that the uranyl luminescence is more specifically a phosphorescence, as it is due to a transition from the lowest triplet excited state to the singlet ground state. The luminescence from K_{2}UO_{2}(SO_{4})_{2} was involved in the discovery of radioactivity.

The uranyl ion has characteristic ν_{U–O} stretching vibrations at ca. 880 cm^{−1} (Raman spectrum) and 950 cm^{−1} (infrared spectrum). These frequencies depend somewhat on which ligands are present in the equatorial plane. Correlations are available between the stretching frequency and U–O bond length. It has also been observed that the stretching frequency correlates with the position of the equatorial ligands in the spectrochemical series.

== Aqueous chemistry ==
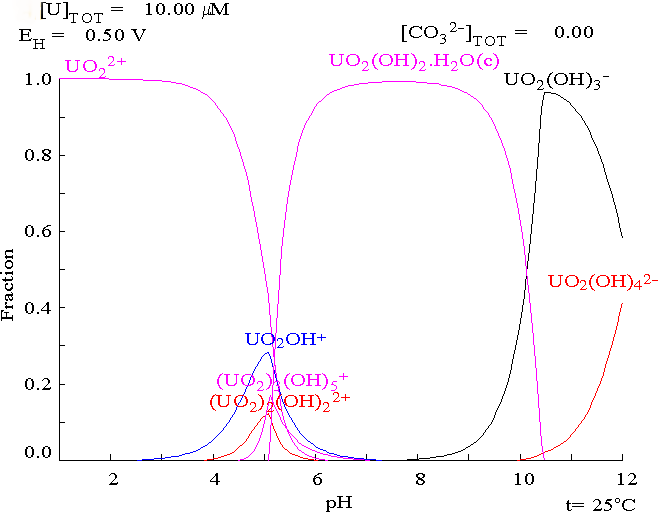
Hydrolysis of uranium(VI) as a function of pH.

The aqueous, hydrated uranyl ion is a weak acid.

[UO_{2}(H_{2}O)_{4}]^{2+} ⇌ [UO_{2}(H_{2}O)_{3}(OH)]^{+} + H^{+}; pK_{a} = ca. 4.2

As pH increases, polymeric species with stoichiometry [(UO_{2})_{2}(OH)_{2}]^{2+} and [(UO_{2})_{3}(OH)_{5}]^{+} are formed before the hydroxide species UO_{2}(OH)_{2} precipitates. The hydroxide dissolves in strongly alkaline solution to give hydroxo complexes of the uranyl ion.

The uranyl ion can be reduced by mild reducing agents, such as zinc metal, to the +4 oxidation state. Reduction to uranium(III) can be achieved using a Jones reductor.

== Reactions ==
Though the oxygen ligands of the uranyl group are often treated as inert, this is not entirely the case.

=== Complexes ===
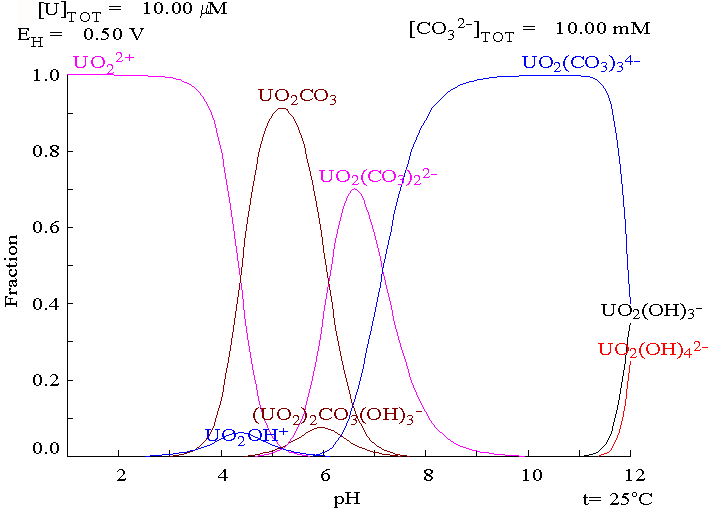
Carbonate and hydoxo complexes of uranium(VI) as a function of pH

The uranyl ion behaves as a hard acceptor and forms weaker complexes with nitrogen-donor ligands than with fluoride and oxygen donor ligands, such as hydroxide, carbonate, nitrate, sulfate and carboxylate. There may be 4, 5 or 6 donor atoms in the equatorial plane. In uranyl nitrate, [UO_{2}(NO_{3})_{2}]·2H_{2}O, for example, there are six donor atoms in the equatorial plane, four from bidentate nitrato ligands and two from water molecules. The structure is described as hexagonal bipyramidal. Other oxygen-donor ligands include phosphine oxides and phosphate esters. As discovered by Christian Friedrich Bucholz already in 1805, uranyl nitrate, UO_{2}(NO_{3})_{2}, can be extracted from relatively concentrated aqueous solutions into diethyl ether. The complex that is extracted has two nitrato ligands bound to the uranyl ion, making a complex with no electrical charge and also the water molecules are replaced by ether molecules, giving the whole complex notable hydrophobic character. Electroneutrality is the most important factor in making the complex soluble in organic solvents. The nitrate ion forms much stronger complexes with the uranyl ion than it does with transition metal and lanthanide ions. For this reason only uranyl and other actinyl ions, including the plutonyl ion, PuO^{2+}_{2}, can be extracted from mixtures containing other ions. Replacing the water molecules that are bound to the uranyl ion in aqueous solution by a second, hydrophobic, ligand increases the solubility of the neutral complex in the organic solvent. This has been called a synergic effect.

The complexes formed by the uranyl ion in aqueous solution are of major importance both in the extraction of uranium from its ores and in nuclear fuel reprocessing. In industrial processes, uranyl nitrate is extracted with tributyl phosphate (TBP, (CH_{3}CH_{2}CH_{2}CH_{2}O)_{3}PO) as the preferred second ligand and kerosene the preferred organic solvent. Later in the process, uranium is stripped from the organic solvent by treating it with strong nitric acid, which forms complexes such as [UO_{2}(NO_{3})_{4}]^{2−} which are more soluble in the aqueous phase. Uranyl nitrate is recovered by evaporating the solution.

== Minerals ==
The uranyl ion occurs in minerals derived from uranium ore deposits by water-rock interactions that occur in uranium-rich mineral seams. Examples of uranyl containing minerals include:

- silicates: uranophane (H_{3}O)_{2}Ca(UO_{2})_{2}(SiO_{4})·3H_{2}O)
- phosphates: autunite (Ca(UO_{2})_{2}(PO_{4})_{2}·8–12H_{2}O), torbernite (Cu(UO_{2})_{2}(PO_{4})·8–12H_{2}O)
- arsenates: arsenuranospathite (Al(UO_{2})_{2}(AsO_{4})_{2}F·20H_{2}O)
- vanadates: carnotite (K_{2}(UO_{2})_{2}(VO_{4})_{2}·3H_{2}O), tyuyamunite (Ca(UO_{2})_{2}V_{2}O_{8}·8H_{2}O)
- carbonates: schröckingerite NaCa_{3}(UO_{2})(CO_{3})_{3}(SO_{4})F·10H_{2}O
- oxalates: uroxite [(UO_{2})_{2}(C_{2}O_{4})(OH)_{2}(H_{2}O)_{2}]·H_{2}O.

These minerals are of little commercial value as most uranium is extracted from pitchblende.

== Uses ==
Uranyl salts are used to stain samples for electron and electromagnetic microscopy studies of DNA. Some uranyl complexes have also emerged as visible-light catalysts for the selective fluorination of unactivated C-H bonds, which is of utility in organic synthesis and pharmaceutical, agricultural, and materials chemistry.

== Health and environmental issues ==
Uranyl salts are toxic and can cause severe chronic kidney disease and acute tubular necrosis. Target organs include the kidneys, liver, lungs and brain. Uranyl ion accumulation in tissues including gonocytes produces congenital disorders, and in white blood cells causes immune system damage. Uranyl compounds are also neurotoxins. Uranyl ion contamination has been found on and around depleted uranium targets.

All uranium compounds are radioactive. However, uranium is usually in depleted form, except in the context of the nuclear industry. Depleted uranium consists mainly of ^{238}U which decays by alpha decay with a half-life of 4.468(3)×10^{9} years. Even if the uranium contained ^{235}U which decays with a similar half-life of about 7.038×10^{8} years, both of them would still be regarded as weak alpha emitters and their radioactivity is only hazardous with direct contact or ingestion.
