= Sklodowskite =

Uranium mineral

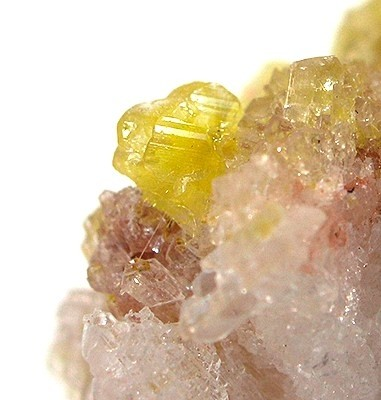
- Sklodowskite on gypsum

General
- Category: Nesosilicate
- Formula: Mg(UO_{2})_{2}(HSiO_{4})_{2}·5H_{2}O
- IMA symbol: Sds
- Strunz classification: 9.AK.10
- Crystal system: Monoclinic
- Crystal class: Prismatic (2/m) (same H-M symbol)
- Space group: C2/m

Identification
- Colour: Light yellow to green-yellow
- Cleavage: Perfect on {100}
- Mohs scale hardness: 2 - 3
- Lustre: Adamantine, vitreous, silky
- Streak: Yellow
- Diaphaneity: Transparent, translucent
- Density: 3.54 g/cm^{3}
- Other characteristics: Radioactive

Sklodowskite is a uranium mineral with the chemical formula: Mg(UO_{2})_{2}(HSiO_{4})_{2}·5H_{2}O. It is a secondary mineral which contains magnesium and is a bright yellow colour, its crystal habit is acicular, but can form in other shapes. It has a Mohs hardness of about 2–3. It is named after the maiden name of Marie Skłodowska Curie. It is the magnesium analogue of the much more common uranium mineral Cuprosklodowskite, which contains copper instead.

It was discovered by Alfred Schoep (1881–1966) in 1924.
