= Uraninite =

Uranium-rich oxide mineral

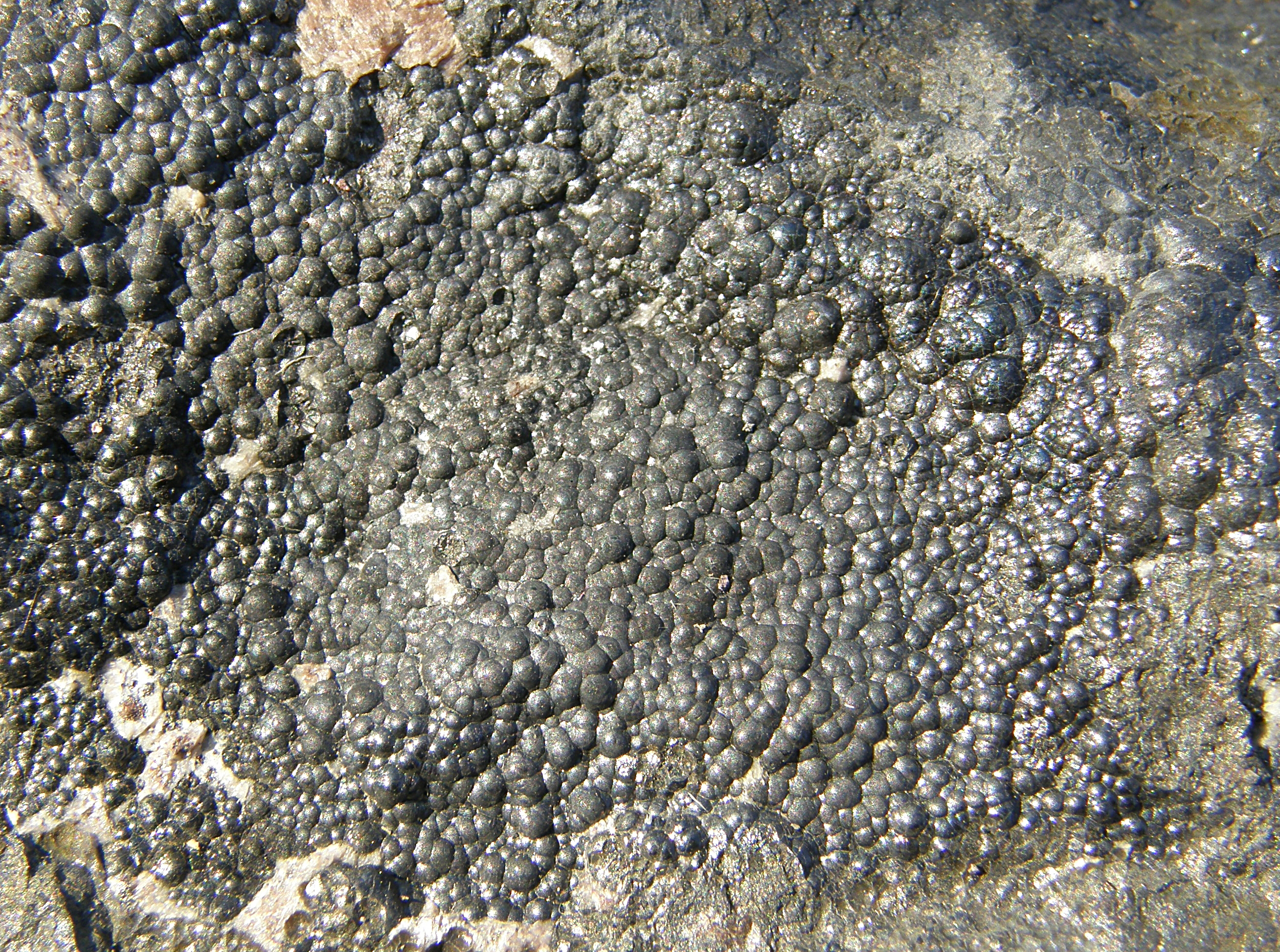
- Pitchblende from Niederschlema-Alberoda deposit, Germany

General
- Category: Oxide minerals
- Formula: Uranium dioxide or uranium(IV) oxide (UO_{2})
- IMA symbol: Urn
- Strunz classification: 4.DL.05
- Crystal system: Isometric
- Crystal class: Hexoctahedral (m3̅m); H-M symbol: (4/m 3̅ 2/m)
- Space group: Fm3̅m
- Unit cell: a = 5.4682 Å; Z = 4

Identification
- Color: Steel-black to velvet-black, brownish black, pale gray to pale green; in transmitted light, pale green, pale yellow to deep brown and green-gray (thin fragments)
- Crystal habit: Massive, botryoidal, granular. Octahedral crystals uncommon.
- Cleavage: Indistinct
- Fracture: Conchoidal to uneven
- Mohs scale hardness: 5–6
- Luster: Submetallic, greasy, dull
- Streak: Brownish black, gray, olive-green
- Diaphaneity: Opaque; transparent in thin fragments
- Specific gravity: 10.63–10.95; decreases on oxidation
- Optical properties: Isotropic
- Other characteristics: Radioactive 20 to 150 kBq/g

Major varieties
- Pitchblende: Massive

Uraninite, also known as pitchblende, is a radioactive, uranium-rich mineral and ore with a chemical composition that is largely UO_{2} but because of oxidation typically contains variable proportions of U_{3}O_{8}. Radioactive decay of the uranium causes the mineral to contain oxides of lead and trace amounts of helium. It may also contain thorium and rare-earth elements.

== Overview ==
Uraninite used to be known as pitchblende (from pitch, because of its black color, and blende, from blenden meaning "to blind" as deceit, a term used by German miners to denote minerals whose density suggested metal content, but whose exploitation, at the time they were named, was either unknown or not economically feasible). The mineral has been known since at least the 15th century, from silver mines in the Ore Mountains, on the German/Czech border. The type locality is the historic mining and spa town known as Joachimsthal, the modern-day Jáchymov, on the Czech side of the mountains, where F. E. Brückmann described the mineral in 1772. Pitchblende from the Johanngeorgenstadt deposit in Germany was used by M. Klaproth in 1789 to discover the element uranium.

All uraninite minerals contain a small amount of radium as a radioactive decay product of uranium. Marie Skłodowska-Curie used pitchblende, processing tons of it herself, as the source material for her isolation of pure metallic radium in 1910.

Uraninite also always contains small amounts of the lead isotopes ^{206}Pb and ^{207}Pb, the end products of the decay series of the uranium isotopes ^{238}U and ^{235}U respectively. Small amounts of helium are also present in uraninite as a result of alpha decay. Helium was first found on Earth in cleveite, an impure radioactive variety of uraninite, after having been discovered spectroscopically in the Sun's atmosphere. The extremely rare elements technetium and promethium can be found in uraninite in very small quantities (about 200 pg/kg and 4 fg/kg respectively), produced by the spontaneous fission of uranium-238. Francium can also be found in uraninite at 1 francium atom for every 1 × 10^{18} uranium atoms in the ore as a result from the decay of actinium.

== Occurrence ==
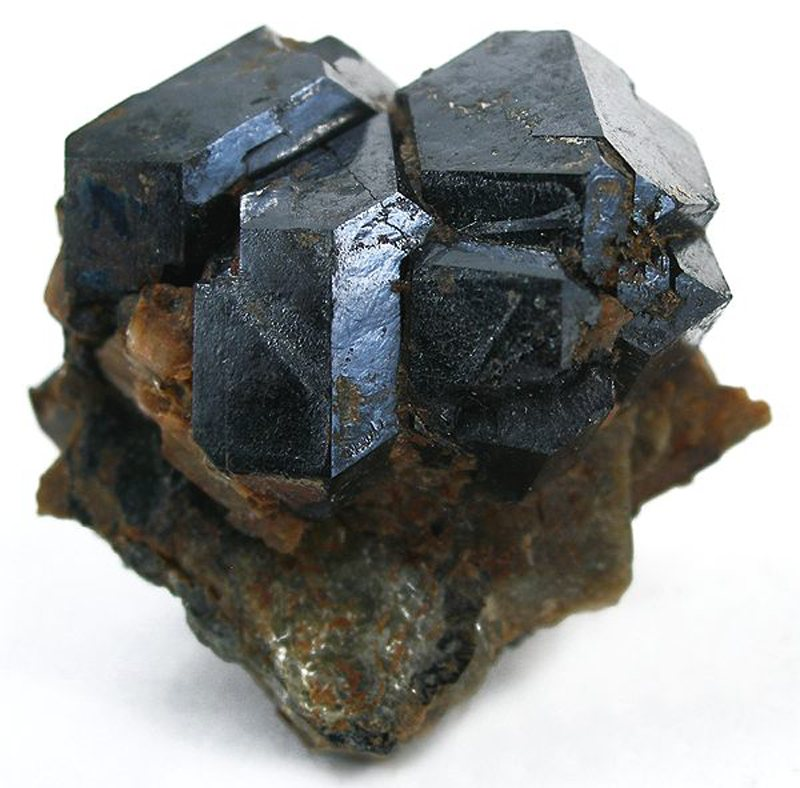
Uraninite crystals from Topsham, Maine (size: 2.7 × 2.4 × 1.4 cm)

Uraninite is a major ore of uranium. Some of the highest-grade uranium ores in the world were found in the Shinkolobwe mine in the Democratic Republic of the Congo (the initial source for the Manhattan Project) and in the Athabasca Basin in northern Saskatchewan, Canada. Another important source of pitchblende is at Great Bear Lake in the Northwest Territories of Canada, where it is found in large quantities associated with silver. It also occurs in Australia, the Czech Republic, Germany, England, Poland, Rwanda, Namibia and South Africa. In the United States, it can be found in the states of Arizona, Colorado, Connecticut, Maine, New Hampshire, New Mexico, North Carolina and Wyoming. The geologist Charles Steen made a fortune on the production of uraninite in his Mi Vida mine in Moab, Utah. Uranium ores from the Ore Mountains (today the border between the Czech Republic and Germany) and the Sudetes (today the border between Poland and the Czech Republic) were an important supply of both the wartime German nuclear program (which failed to produce a bomb) and the Soviet nuclear program. Mining for uranium in the Sudetes in the Polish People's Republic (under the auspices of the Kowary Mines Entreprise, later renamed Industrial Works R-1 State Enterprise) ceased mostly in the 1950s (though some residual mining continued until 1973), but in the Ore Mountains in the German Democratic Republic it continued (under the auspices of SDAG Wismut) until the German Reunification.

Uranium ore is generally processed close to the mine into yellowcake, which is an intermediate step in the processing of uranium.

== See also ==
- List of minerals
- List of uranium mines
- Thorianite
- Uranium ore deposits
