= Uranium mining in Colorado =

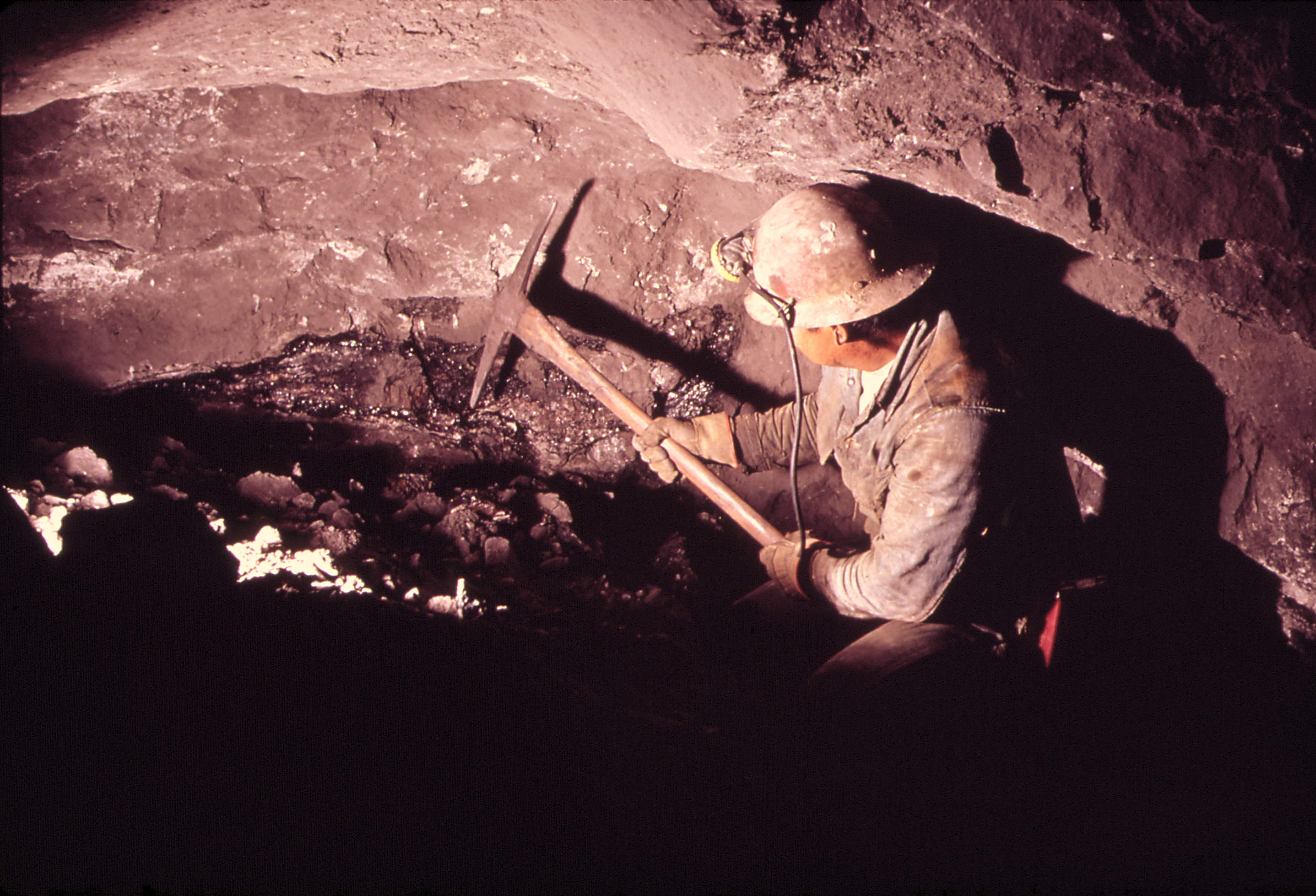
Underground uranium mining in Nucla, Montrose County, Colorado

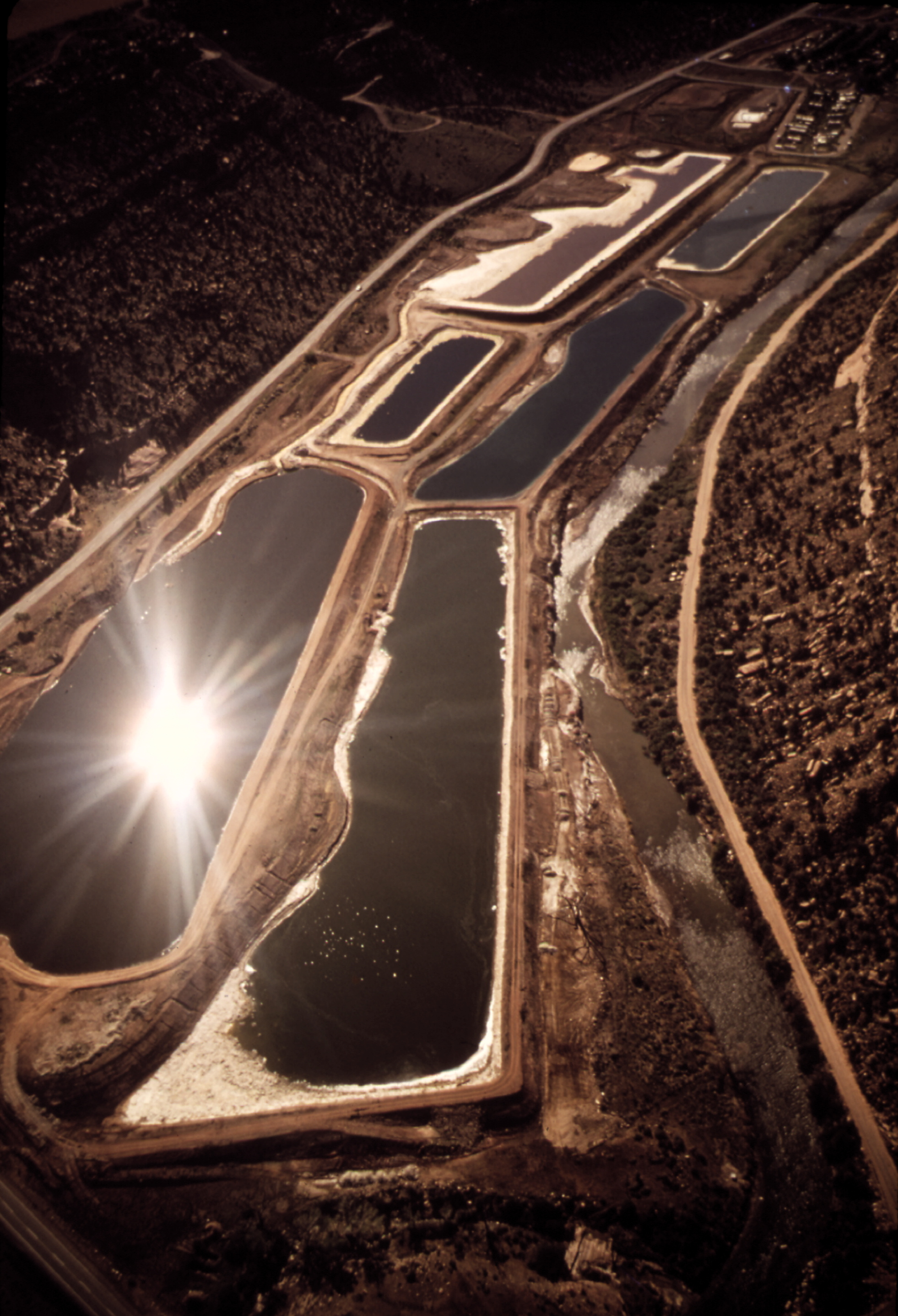
Holding ponds at Uranium processing mill in Uravan, Montrose County, Colorado

Uranium mining in Colorado, United States, goes back to 1872, when pitchblende ore was taken from gold mines near Central City, Colorado. The Colorado uranium industry has seen booms and busts, but continues to this day. Not counting byproduct uranium from phosphate, Colorado is considered to have the third largest uranium reserves of any US state, behind Wyoming and New Mexico.

Uranium price increases from 2001 to 2007 prompted a number of companies to revive uranium mining in Colorado. However, price drops and financing problems in late 2008 have forced some companies to cancel or scale back uranium-mining projects. There are no currently producing uranium mines in Colorado.

== Front Range ==
Hydrothermal uranium deposits are present through a widely spaced area in the Front Range of the Rocky Mountains, in Larimer, Boulder, Gilpin, Clear Creek, and Jefferson counties.

The first uranium identified in the USA was pitchblende from the Wood gold mine at Central City, Colorado in 1871. Pitchblende orebodies were also discovered in the Calhoun mine, the Kirk mine, and some others. About 122,000 pounds (55 metric tons) of uranium oxide (U_{3}O_{8}) were shipped at irregular intervals from six gold mines in the Central City district from 1872 to about 1916.

The uranium boom of the late 1940s revived the search for uranium orebodies in the gold and silver mines of the Front Range. Again, uranium was produced from a number of mines, but the orebodies were small and discontinuous. Pitchblende was discovered in 1948 in the Caribou silver mine at the town of Caribou, Boulder County. A small amount of uranium ore was produced.

In 1949, janitor and weekend prospector Fred Schwartzwalder discovered uranium at an abandoned copper prospect in Jefferson County about ten miles (16 km) northeast of Central City and eight miles (13 km) north of Golden. The deposit consists of Tertiary hydrothermal veins filling fracture zones oriented predominantly NNW-SSE in gneiss, schist, and quartzite of the Precambrian Idaho Springs Formation. The chief ore mineral is pitchblende, which occurs with adularia and ankerite. Schwartzwalder could interest no one in his discovery, so he drove the first adit of the Schwartzwalder mine by himself, made the first ore shipment in 1953, and sold the mine in 1955. The Schwartzwalder mine was the source of more than 99% of the uranium produced from the Front Range. The mine operated until 1995, producing 17 million pounds (7700 metric tons) of uranium oxide. The mine was owned by the General Atomics subsidiary Cotter Corporation, which estimated that there are an additional 16 million pounds (7300 metric tons) of uranium oxide resource remaining in the mine. In 2024, the Colorado Department of Natural Resources Division of Reclamation, Mining and Safety (DRMS) took the mine over from Colorado Legacy Land, LLC, which had acquired the mine from Cotter.

The Copper King mine, in Larimer County about 25 miles (40 km) northwest of Fort Collins and five miles (8.0 km) northeast of Red Feather Lakes contained a skarn deposit that was worked unsuccessfully for zinc in 1920 and 1936. Prospectors found uranium at the abandoned mine in 1949, and it was worked for uranium from 1951 until 1953. The uranium occurs as pitchblende in a hydrothermal vein deposit in Precambrian granite. Although the zinc skarn and the pitchblende vein are exposed in the same workings, the pitchblende appears to have been deposited much later.

Other vein-type uranium mines in the Front Range were the Fairday A. M. mine near Jamestown in Boulder County, and the Wright Lease mine near Ideledale in Jefferson County.

== Uravan mineral belt ==
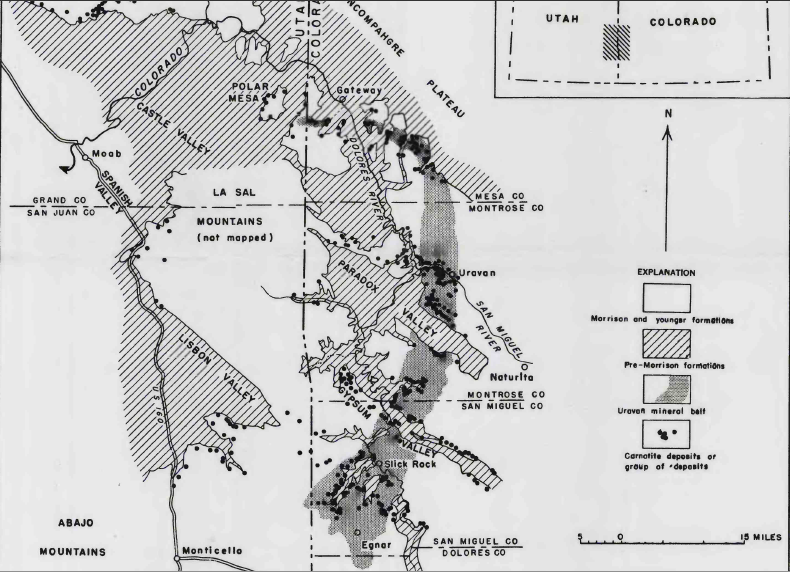
Map of the Uravan Mineral Belt

The 70-mile long (110 km) Uravan mineral belt is an arcuate zone of uranium-vanadium deposits in San Miguel, Montrose, and Mesa counties, Colorado, and Grand County, Utah. It was the area most productive of uranium in the United States in the early 20th century. The mineral belt includes the Slick Rock, Gypsum Valley, Uravan, and Gateway mining districts.

Uranium mining in southwest Colorado goes back to 1898, when a miner dug 10 tonnes (22,000 lb; 10,000 kg) of yellow ore that tested high in uranium and vanadium out of a deposit at Roc Creek in Montrose County, Colorado, and shipped it to France, where M. M. C. Friedel and E. Cumenge identified the new mineral that they named carnotite. The mineral was mined for its vanadium, with uranium as a byproduct.

Although radium had been discovered in 1898, it had been derived from pitchblende, and the radium content of carnotite was not known. Carnotite was suspected to contain radium as early as 1903, on the basis of the anomalously high radioactivity of carnotite ores. But it was not until 1911 that the radium content of carnotite was confirmed by the Marie Curie laboratory in Paris. Although no more than a trace of radium was present in the ore, newly discovered medical applications had made radium worth $100 per milligram (equivalent to $3,400 per milligram today), making the radium in the carnotite ore worth much more than the vanadium or uranium.

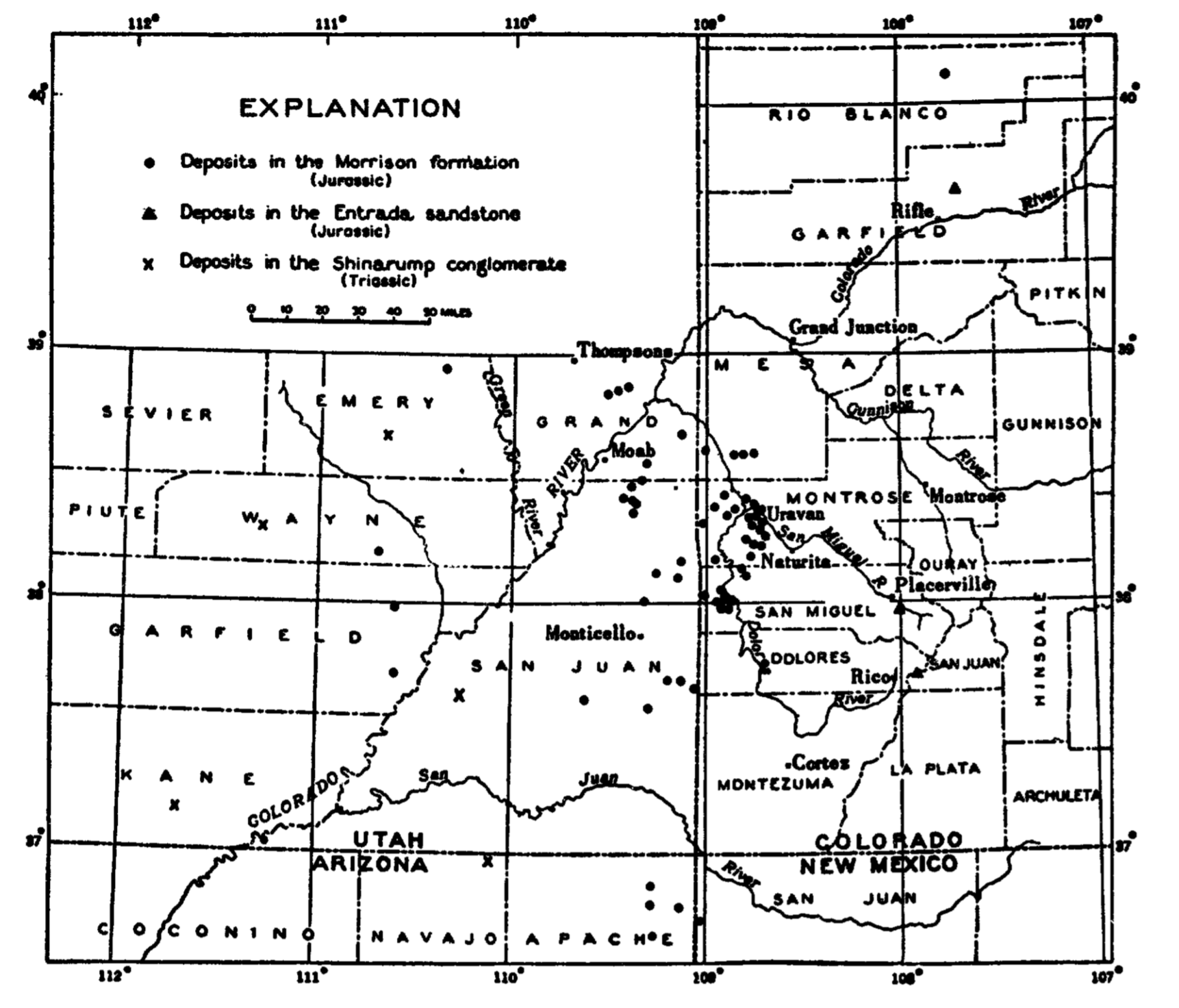
General distribution of carnotite-bearing deposits in Four Corners region, 1952

Once carnotite was known to contain radium, prospectors rushed to the Colorado Plateau of southwest Colorado and adjacent southeast Utah, and found carnotite-bearing sandstones of the Jurassic Morrison Formation in Mesa, Montrose, and San Miguel counties in Colorado. The carnotite was at first shipped to Europe for processing, but by 1913, the Standard Chemical Company had built a radium processing plant in Montrose County that had become the world's largest supplier of radium.

The Uravan mineral belt of Colorado and Utah supplied about half the world's radium from 1910 to 1922, and vanadium and uranium were byproducts. The mines were forced out of business in 1923, when rich pitchblende deposits in the Belgian Congo forced down the price of radium. Mining revived in 1935 when the price of vanadium rose, and boomed after World War II when the government stockpiled uranium for nuclear weapons programs.

The Uravan mineral belt contains what was the last producing uranium mine in the state, the Topaz Mine, part of the Sunday Complex near Uravan, Colorado, which was closed down on 18 March 2009 by then owner Denison Mines due to depressed uranium prices.

Energy Fuels Inc. has applied for a permit to rehabilitate and begin pilot production at the Torbyn mine, a former uranium producer in Mesa County just east of Gateway.

== South Park ==
Prospectors examined copper-stained sandstone a mile south of Garo in Park County in 1903, but the copper content was too low to mine. In 1919, prospectors discovered that the sandstone contained uranium and vanadium, and about 40 tons of ore containing up to 1% uranium was mined from underground workings. The mine was reactivated as an open-pit uranium mine in 1951 and closed in 1952. The ore consisted of the uranium-vanadium minerals tyuyamunite, metatyuyamunite, and carnotite, along with the copper minerals covellite, chalcocite, azurite, and malachite, and the copper-vanadium mineral volborthite, in the Maroon Formation of Pennsylvanian-Permian age. The ore is associated with faulting-induced fractures in the sandstone.

Horizon Nevada Uranium Inc. has announced plans for exploration drilling in 2008 for uranium in the South Park Ranch area of southeast Park County.

== Cochetopa district ==
The Cochetopa mining district is about 20 miles (32 km) southeast of Gunnison in northwest Saguache and southern Gunnison County. Uranium was discovered in outcrops of the Morrison Formation (Jurassic). Mineralization occurs in silicified (chalcedony and quartz) veins cutting the Morrison Formation and the subjacent Precambrian schist. The veins contain pitchblende, autunite and uranophane, with accessory marcasite and barite. Extraction started in 1954, by underground mining.

== Marshall Pass district ==
Uranium was discovered near Marshall Pass in northern Saguache and southeastern Gunnison counties, in 1955. Although the initial discoveries were uneconomic, they attracted further prospecting, which located commercial orebodies along the Chester thrust fault of Laramide age. The deposits are about six-mile east of Sargents. The orebodies are primarily pyrite and pitchblende replacements of Paleozoic sedimentary rocks and Precambrian igneous and metamorphic rocks. Some uranophane and autunite are also present. Initial mining was by small open pits; underground mines were later developed.

== Maybell district ==
The Maybell district in Moffat County was discovered in 1954 by an airborne radiation survey. Uranium was present as meta-autunite, uranophane, uraninite, and coffinite in tufaceous fluvial sandstones of the Miocene Browns Park Formation. Ore deposits are associated with faults, which are thought to have been pathways for reducing solutions from below. Ore was taken from numerous open-pit mines between two and three miles north of US Highway 40, between the towns of Maybell and Lay from 1953–1964 and 1976–1981. Ores were treated in a local ore mill, five miles (8.0 km) east-northeast of Maybell, during the 1953–1964 period; during 1976–1981, ore was heap-leached, and the eluate trucked to Wyoming for uranium recovery. Total production of the district was 5.3 million pounds (2.4 million kilograms) of uranium oxide.

== Tallahassee Creek ==
Surface radioactive anomalies led to uranium discoveries in 1954 at Tallahassee Creek in Fremont County. Mining in the 1950s was by both underground and open-pit methods.

Exploration in the 1970s by Cyprus Mines and Wyoming Minerals defined two orebodies: the Hansen orebody, estimated to contain 12 million pounds of U_{3}O_{8}, and the Picnic Tree orebody, estimated to contain 1 million pounds U_{3}O_{8}. Uranium is present as uraninite, coffinite, and meta-autunite in Eocene and Oligocene arkosic sandstone, conglomerate, and in sediments interbedded with Miocene volcanic flows. Uranium is associated with carbonaceous material, and pyrite. The source of uranium is thought to be the Oligocene Wall Mountain Tuff.

In December 2006, the Australian company Black Range Minerals bought rights to mine the Taylor Ranch property, which the company describes as a 30-million pound uranium orebody that had been discovered in the late 1970s, but abandoned because of low uranium prices. The company plans an extensive drilling program in 2008 to delineate the orebody.

== Denver Basin ==
Relatively small amounts of uranium ore have been mined from the Dakota Sandstone along the western edge of the Denver Basin. The Mann mine, near Morrison, Colorado, produced 16,000 pounds (7.1 metric tons) of uranium oxide from 1955 to 1961. The Mike Doyle mine in El Paso County produced 280 pounds (130 kg) of uranium oxide from Dakota sandstone in 1955. Also in 1955, a Dakota sandstone mine in Larimer County produced 8 pounds of uranium along with some vanadium.

The Leyden coal mine, north of Golden, Colorado, produced 4500 pounds (2.1 metric tons) of uranium oxide from 1954 to 1956, as a byproduct of coal mining in the Laramie Formation.

Rancher Solomon Schlagel discovered uranium in Weld County, Colorado in 1969 when he noticed that cuttings from seismic shotholes were anomalously radioactive. Exploration in the 1970s defined a number of roll-front uranium deposits in the Upper Cretaceous Laramie Formation and Fox Hills Formation in Weld County. They all occur along the southern margin of the Cheyenne sub-basin of the Denver Basin.

Wyoming Minerals Corporation operated a pilot in-situ leaching plant from June 1977 to May 1978, successfully extracting uranium from a deposit in the Laramie Formation near the town of Grover. The aquifer was then remediated.

Power Resources Corporation began in-situ mining the uranium deposit in the Fox Hills Formation at Keota, Colorado in 1980. The Keota deposit was estimated to contain 5 to 10 million pounds (2300 to 4500 metric tons) of uranium oxide, but the project was halted because of low uranium prices.

=== Centennial project ===
In 2006, Vancouver-based Powertech (USA) Inc. bought mineral rights and leases over the Centennial Project in Weld County near Nunn, Colorado, which had been explored in the 1970s by Rocky Mountain Energy. Powertech is currently evaluating the property for in-situ leaching using a leach solution of dissolved carbon dioxide and oxygen.

The uranium occurs in a series of roll fronts in sandstones of the Fox Hills Formation aligned roughly north-south over 11 miles. A consultant for Powertech has estimated that the deposits contain identified reserves of 9.7 million pounds (4400 metric tons) of uranium oxide recoverable by in-situ and open-pit methods, with potential for another three to five million pounds.

If all goes according to Powertech's proposed timeline, the process of obtaining government permits would extend through the end of 2009, after which the in-situ leaching would extract 800,000 pounds (360 metric tons) of uranium per year for ten years. The uranium would be stripped from the leachate using ion exchange resin. The loaded resin beads would be trucked to an off-site facility for reprocessing and precipitation of uranium concentrate. Solution mining would move progressively from north to south, with remediation following mining as each orebody is mined out.

Powertech's mining plans are opposed by Coloradoans Against Resource Destruction (CARD), who point out that the Fox Hills Formation is an important water-supply aquifer.

== Environmental issues ==
Three former uranium mill sites in Colorado are current United States Environmental Protection Agency National Priorities List (Superfund) sites:

- Denver Radium Site, in Denver, Colorado.
- Lincoln Park, adjacent to the Cotter Corporation uranium mill at Canon City in Fremont County. The U.S. Environmental Protection Agency is supervising cleanup of waste from previous operations. The mill still has a license to process uranium ore.
- Uravan Uranium Project, at the now-abandoned town of Uravan, in Montrose County.

In addition, there are 15 Uranium Mill Tailings Remedial Action (UMTRA) sites in the state, under the purview of the United States Department of Energy. Eight of the sites are former uranium ore mills, and seven are engineered permanent disposal sites for the mill tailings.

== Current uranium mining ==
There are a variety of active uranium mines in Colorado in the Ivan belt. One currently active uranium mine in the state is the Sunday mine near Uravan, owned by Piñon Ridge Mining.

In 2007, Energy Fuels Inc. announced plans to build a uranium-vanadium processing mill in the Uravan district, west of Naturita. If permitted and built, the mill would be the first new uranium mill built in the United States in 25 years. The US Bureau of Land Management has issued a "finding of no significant impact", which will allow Energy Fuels to start mining at its Whirlwind mine in Mesa County, Colorado. The mine is projected to produce 250,000 pounds (110,000 kg) of U_{3}O_{8} and one million pounds of V_{2}O_{5} per year.

Canadian-based Powertech (USA) Inc. is currently evaluating roll-front uranium deposits in its Centennial Project in Weld County on Colorado's eastern plains. In response to the proposed mining in Weld county, state lawmakers have put forward two proposals to more closely regulate uranium mining in Colorado; the first would require that mining companies prove that groundwater would not be adversely affected before mining could begin; the second would assure that local governments have the power to set health and environmental standards.

== See also ==
- Coal mining in Colorado
- Gold mining in Colorado
- List of uranium projects
- O. Barlow Willmarth
- Silver mining in Colorado
- Uranium mining in Arizona
- Uranium mining in the United States
- Uranium mining in Utah
