= Uranium mining in Utah =

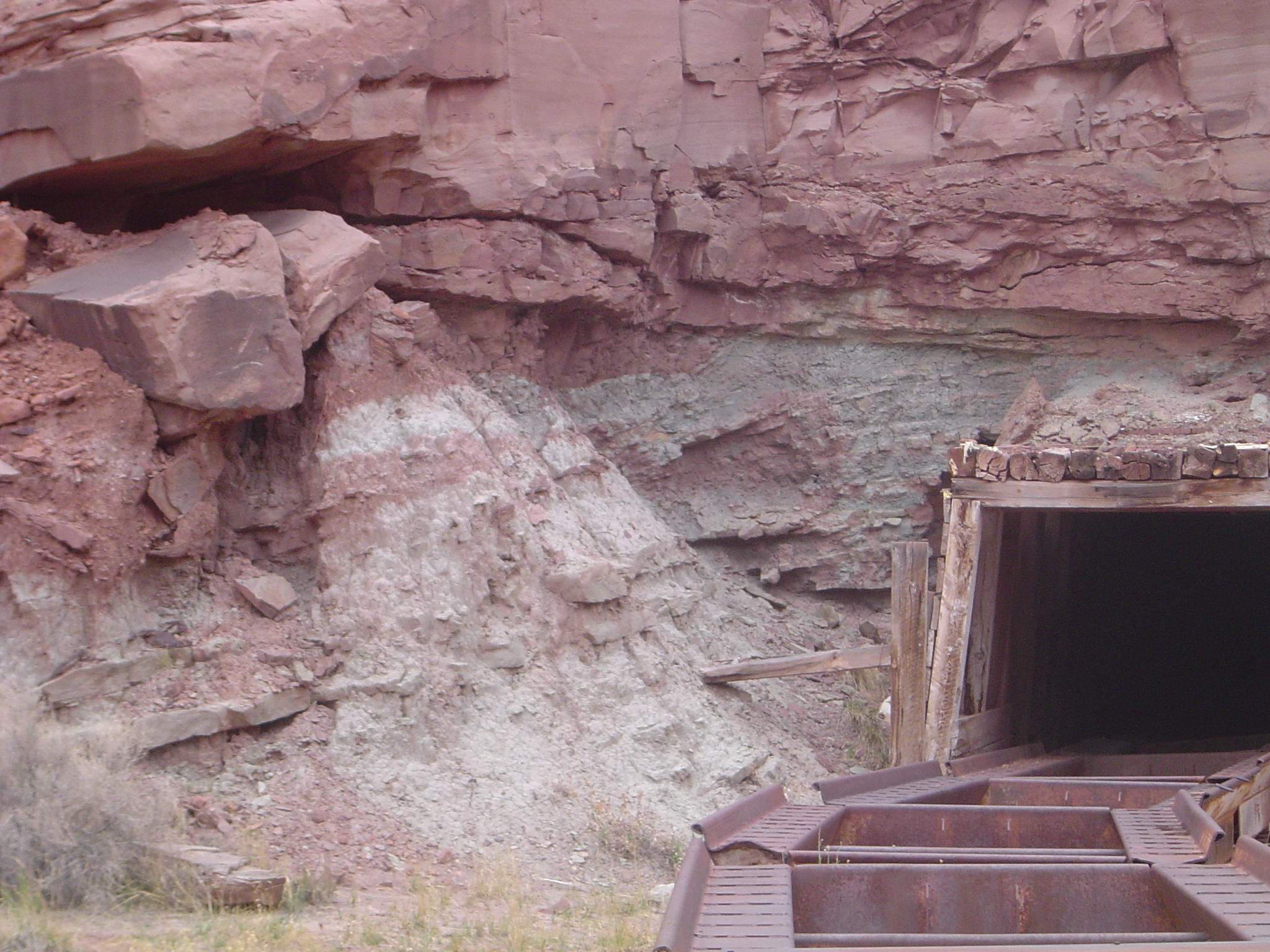
Mi Vida uranium mine near Moab

Uranium mining in Utah, a state of the United States, has a history going back more than 100 years. Uranium mining started as a byproduct of vanadium mining about 1900, became a byproduct of radium mining about 1910, then back to a byproduct of vanadium when the radium price fell in the 1920s. Utah saw a uranium boom in the late 1940s and early 1950s, but uranium mining declined in the 1980s. Since 2001 there has been a revival of interest in uranium mining, as a result of higher uranium prices.

== Uravan mineral belt ==
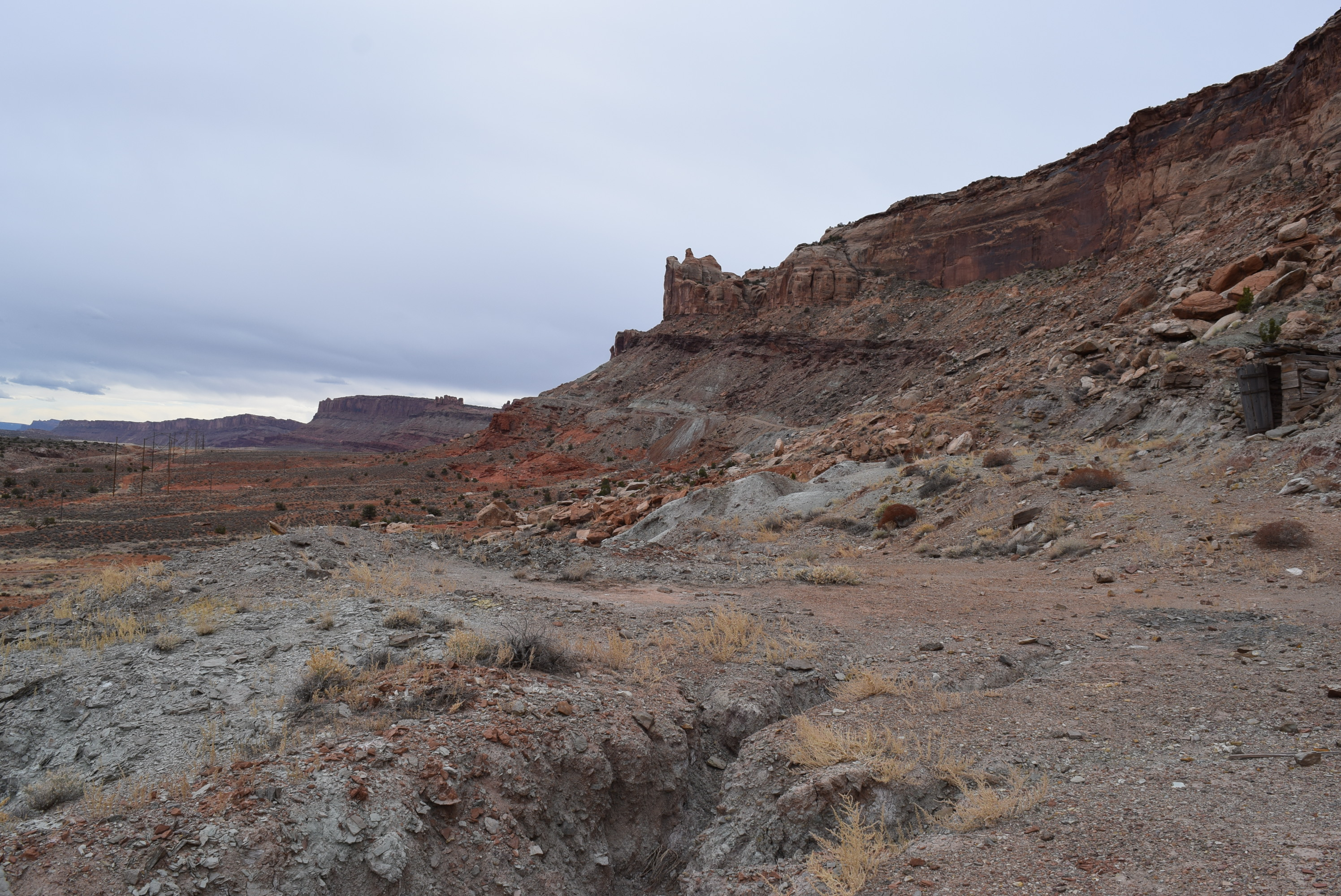
Mine waste dumps (gray-green rock) at Shinarump Mine, 10 mi (16 km) northwest of Moab

Mining of uranium-vanadium ore in southeast Utah goes back to the late 19th century, at the northern end of the Uravan mineral belt (see Uranium mining in Colorado), where it crosses into Grand County, Utah. Uranium occurs in the Salt Wash member of the Morrison Formation of Jurassic age. Because much of the value depended on the vanadium content, the only economic ore minerals were carnotite and tyuyamunite. Following World War II buying for nuclear weapons programs made uranium valuable for its own sake, and attracted hundreds of prospectors to southeast Utah.

== Lisbon Valley ==
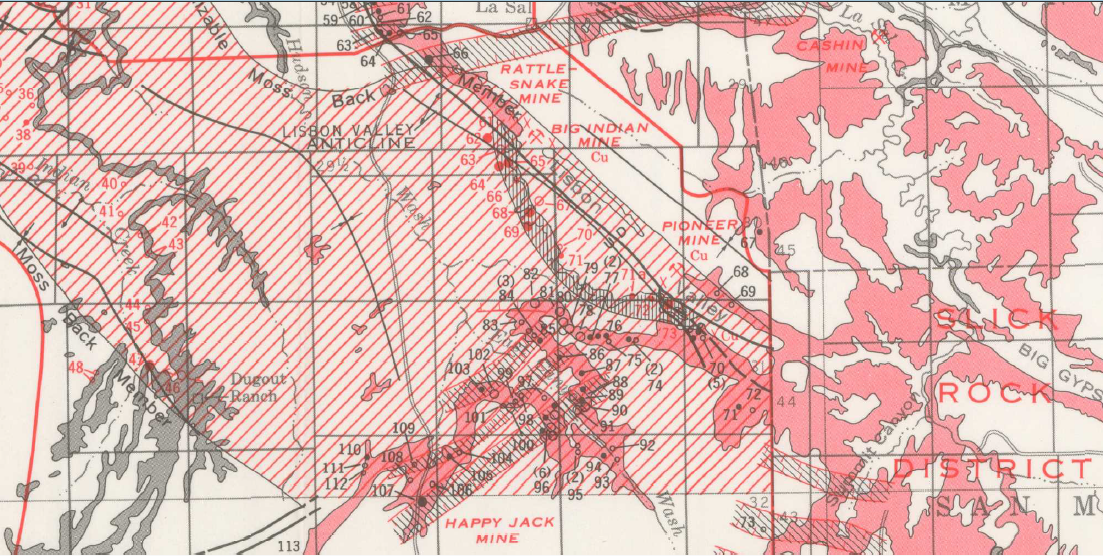
Geological map of the Lisbon Valley area with key uranium mines numbered. The Mi Vida Mine is a red number 68.

Uranium was discovered in sandstone of the Chinle Formation in Lisbon Valley, San Juan County in 1913, and some carnotite was mined on a small scale for vanadium in 1917, 1940, and 1941. In the uranium mining boom of 1948, mining began in sandstone of the Permian Cutler Formation. Then in 1952, Charles Steen drilled into a rich 70-foot-thick (21 m) uraninite orebody in the Triassic Chinle Formation; that type of deposit became the largest producer in the district. Ore is distributed along 15 mi (24 km) of outcrop on the southwest side of the Lisbon valley anticline. The district produced 49 million pounds (22 kt) of U_{3}O_{8} (uranium oxide) through 1965.

The Rio Algom Uranium Mill operated from 1972 to 1988.

On November 4, 2016, a historical marker commemorating the Lisbon Valley's uranium heritage and noting Charlie Steen's discovery was dedicated on the Anticline Overlook road off U.S. 191. The marker was funded entirely by private donations. Artist Michael Ford Dunton created an arch to frame the historical marker and the view to the location of the Mi Vida mine, seven miles (11 km) to the east of the marker.

== White Canyon and Monument Valley districts ==
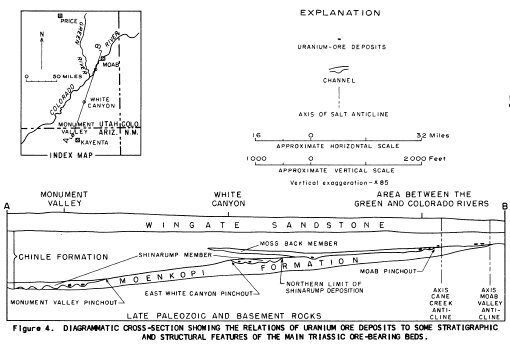
Geologic cross section through Monument Valley and White Canyon showing key geologic features

Uranium associated with copper mineralization at the White Canyon district was identified in 1920, but production did not begin until 1946. The geology is similar to that of the Monument Valley uranium district 40 mi (64 km) to the south which straddles the Utah/Arizona state line (see Uranium mining in Arizona). Uranium occurs in the Shinarump Member of the Triassic Chinle Formation. Primary ore minerals are uraninite and coffinite. Through 1965, the White Canyon district produced 10 million pounds (4.5 kt) of U_{3}O_{8}.

In 2009 White Canyon Uranium opened the Daneros underground mine, 40 miles west of Blanding in the White Canyon District, trucking ore to Denison Mines's White Mesa Mill. Daneros was the first new uranium mine permitted in Utah since the 1980s. In 2011 Denison took over White Canyon Uranium. In 2012 Energy Fuels acquired the Daneros mine from Denison. Energy Fuels produced from the Daneros mine until October 2012, at which time the mine was placed on standby, care, and maintenance.

== Marysvale district ==
At the Marysvale district, in Piute and Sevier counties, uranium occurs in hydrothermal veins in igneous rocks (quartz monzonite, latite porphyry, and aplite). Primary uranium minerals are uraninite and umohoite, with associated gangue minerals pyrite, fluorite, quartz, and adularia.

== Silver Reef district ==
Uranium minerals were noted by 1881 in the silver mines at the Silver Reef/Harrisburg district, at Silver Reef, Washington County. No uranium was extracted until 1950, when a small shipment was made. The uranium occurs as carnotite along with copper mineralization and the silver mineral chlorargyrite in the Chinle Formation. Uranium production has been minor.

== Yellow Chief mine ==
Uranium was mined from tuffaceous conglomerate and sandstone of the Miocene Spor Mountain Formation at the Yellow Chief mine in the Thomas Range of Juab County. The uranium ore minerals were beta-uranophane, weeksite, and Schröckingerite.

== Bingham Canyon copper mine ==
The Bingham Canyon Mine in Salt Lake County, a large porphyry copper mine, recovered 120,000 to 150,000 lb (54,000 to 68,000 kg) of uranium oxide each year from 1978 through 1989, as part of its copper mining operation.

== Recent activity ==
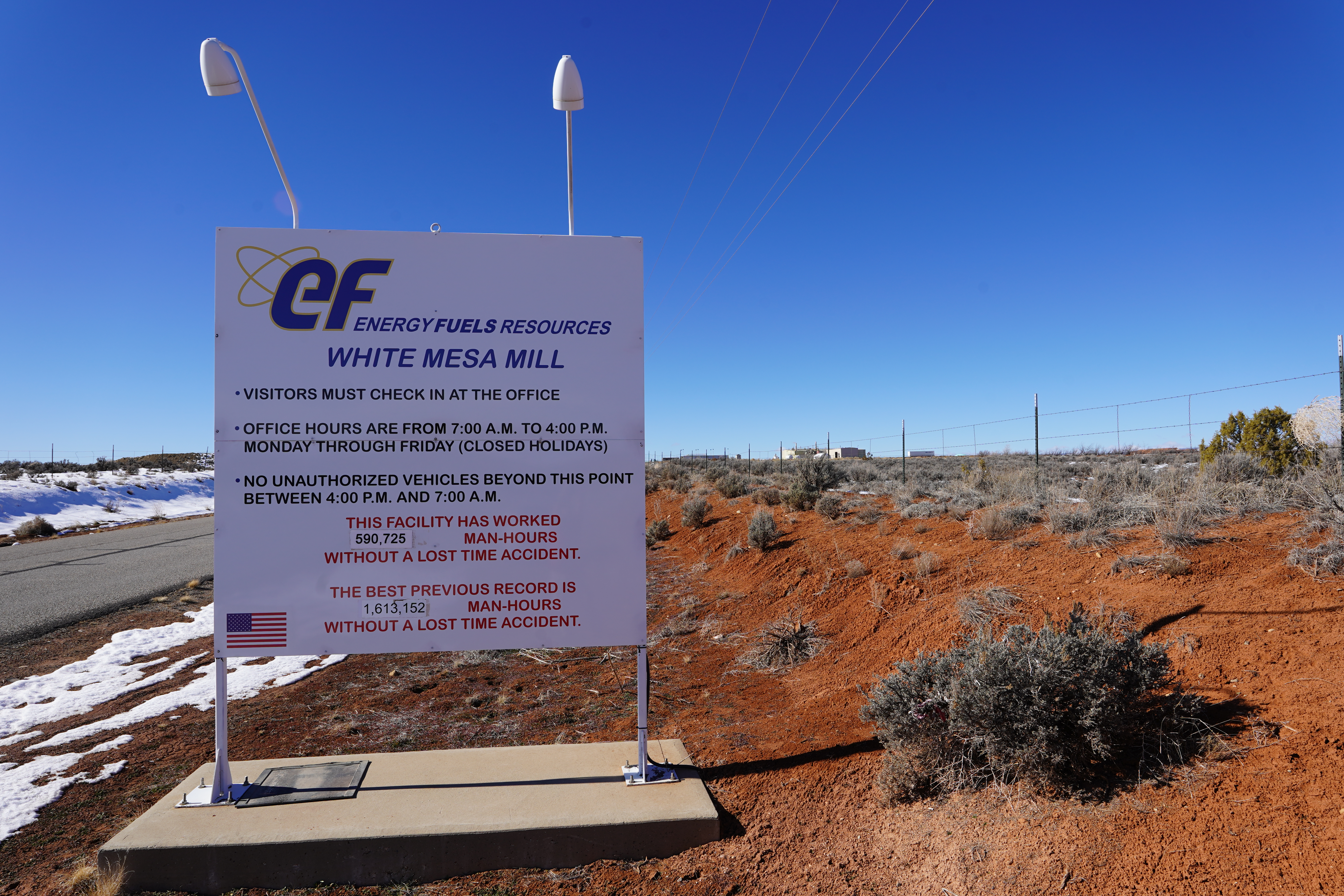
White Mesa Mill sign, January 2019

All of Utah’s numerous uranium mines closed prior to 2000 due to low uranium prices.

In late 2006, Denison Mines reopened the Pandora mine in the La Sal mining district of southeastern Utah. Denison Mines received all the required permits from the state of Utah and the US Bureau of Land Management to reopen its Tony M uranium mine in the Henry Mountains. The Henry Mountains Complex (including the Tony M mine) has an indicated resource of 12.8 million pounds (5,800 tonnes) of uranium at a grade of 0.27% U_{3}O_{8}.

In 2012 Energy Fuels Inc. acquired all of Denison Mines uranium properties located in the United States, including the White Mesa Mill. The White Mesa Mill, located near Blanding, Utah, is the only conventional uranium (and vanadium) mill operating in the United States.

The Pandora mine and Henry Mountains Complex, in addition to the Beaver and Daneros mines, were placed on standby, care and maintenance by Energy Fuels in the fall of 2012.

== See also ==
- Moab uranium mill tailings pile
- Uranium mining in the United States
- Uranium mining and the Navajo people
- The Navajo People and Uranium Mining
- The Return of Navajo Boy, a documentary film about Native Americans struggling with the legacy of uranium mining on their lands.
