= O. Barlow Willmarth =

American businessman

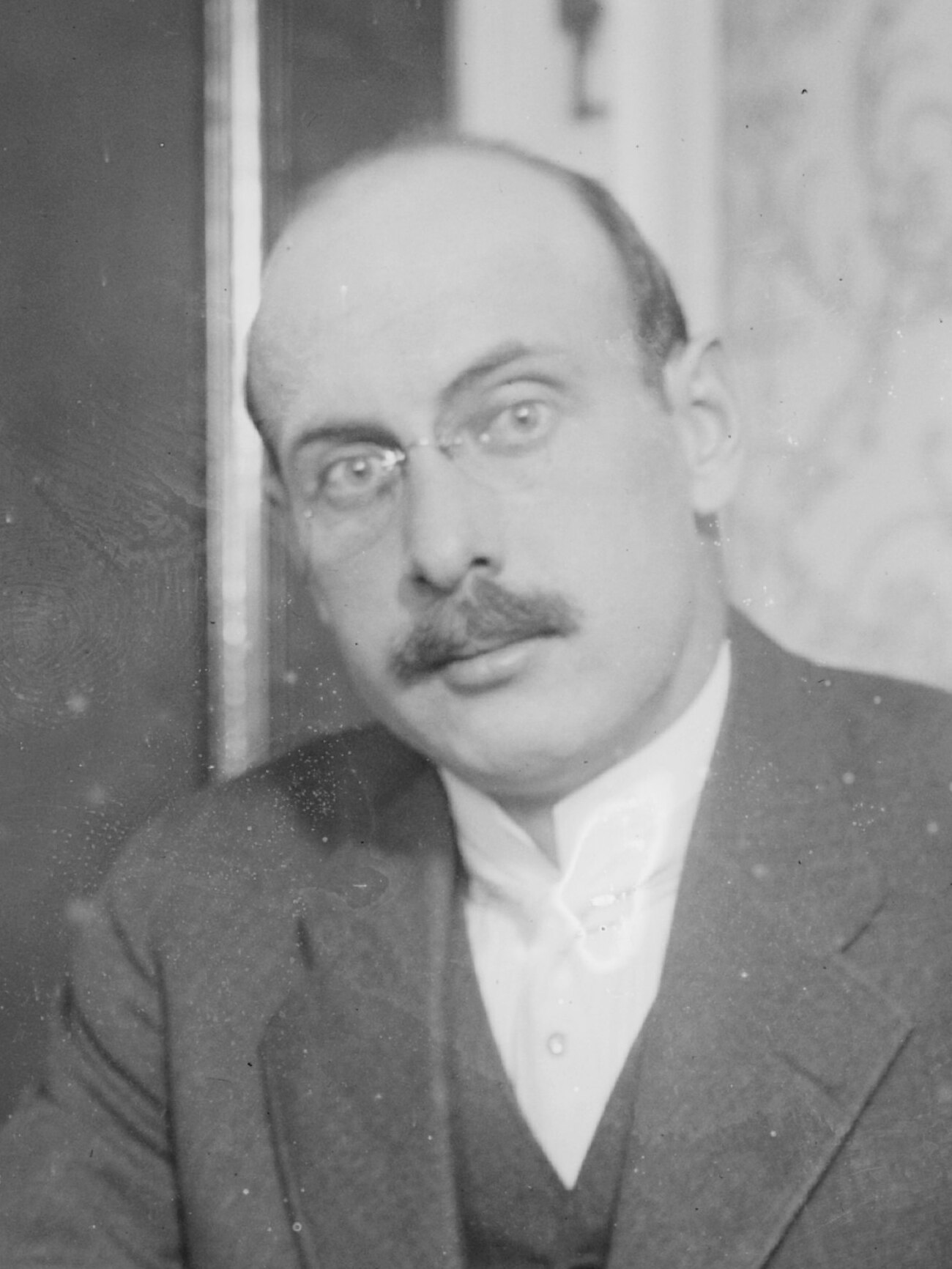
O. Barlow Willmarth in the 1910s

O. Barlow Willmarth (1882-?), was the president of the Colorado Carnotite Company. The company was performing uranium mining in Colorado where the company extracted radium from the carnotite ore.

== See also ==
- Allen Hall (University of Pittsburgh)
