= Margaritasite =

General
- Category: Carnotite group
- Formula: (Cs, K, H_{3}O)_{2}(UO_{2})_{2}V_{2}O_{8}·H_{2}O
- IMA symbol: Mgt
- Strunz classification: 7/E.11-60
- Dana classification: 40.2a.28.2
- Crystal system: Monoclinic
- Crystal class: 2/m – Prismatic
- Space group: P2_{1}/a (no. 14)
- Unit cell: a = 10.514(3) Å, b = 8.425(3) Å, c = 7.252(5) Å β = 106.01°

Identification
- Color: Yellow
- Crystal habit: Tabular crystals, typically massive
- Diaphaneity: Translucent
- Specific gravity: 5.41
- Optical properties: Biaxial (−) α = [< 1.83] (synthetic). β = 2.49(1) γ = > 2.7
- 2V angle: 45.5◦
- Other characteristics: Radioactive

Margaritasite is a yellow, caesium-bearing mineral in the carnotite group. Its chemical formula is (Cs, K, H_{3}O)_{2}(UO_{2})_{2}V_{2}O_{8}·H_{2}O and its crystal system is monoclinic (space group P2_{1}/a).

== Name and discovery ==
It was first described in 1982 from the Margaritas uranium deposit in the Peña Blanca district of the municipality of Aldama, in the Mexican state of Chihuahua.

== See also ==
- List of minerals
