= Hanging Flume =

Open water chute in Colorado, US

- U.S. National Register of Historic Places
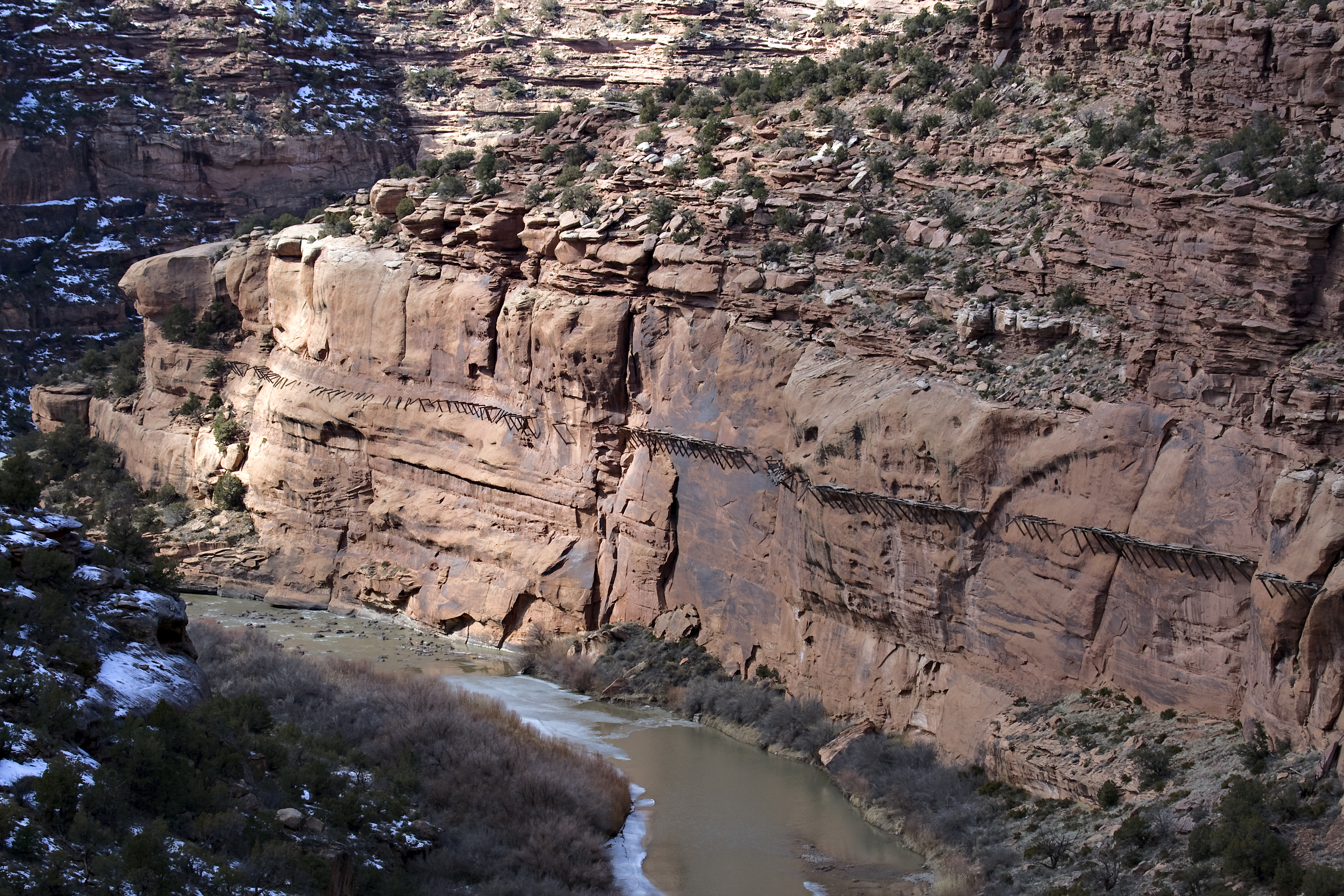
- Remnants of the Hanging Flume, horizontally two-thirds up the cliff-face

- Location within Colorado Location within the United States
- Location: 5.7 mi. NW of Uravan on CO 141, Uravan, Colorado
- Coordinates: 38°24′6″N 108°47′56″W
- Area: 4.4 acres (1.8 ha)
- Built: 1889
- NRHP reference No.: 80000917
- Added to NRHP: May 15, 1980

The Hanging Flume was an open water chute (known as a flume) built over the Dolores River Canyon in Colorado. The Montrose Placer Mining Company built the flume in the 1880s to facilitate gold mining. Some sections of the flume remain attached to the canyon wall, although much of the wood has vanished.

== Background ==
The Montrose Placer Mining Company was formed to mine gold from placer deposits along the Dolores River. Hydraulic mining, a popular method of exploiting placer deposits, required water to be efficiently transported, often using wooden flumes to maintain the necessary volume and pressure. Cliffside flumes were developed in California, using trestles and brackets (called bents) at regular intervals to support the flume box. The flume connected with a six-mile (10 km) long ditch, both designed to provide water for miners in the San Juan Mountains of Colorado.

== Construction ==
Construction of the Hanging Flume took three years, beginning in 1887. Approximately 24 workers, most being Asian immigrants, suspended from ropes onto the cliff face. A derrick may also have been used. The construction used 1.8 million board feet of lumber and ended up with a total cost over $100,000. The timber used was mostly Ponderosa pine, a local tree, and it was supported using iron rods. The completed flume was approximately 12 miles (19 km) long and up to 75 feet (23 m) above the river. It began on a dam on the San Miguel River above Uravan, Colorado. The flume's opening (the headgate) no longer exists, and the connecting ditch has been filled.

The actual wooden flume was 6 feet wide and 4 feet deep. When in use, it conveyed 80,000,000 gallons of water each day.

The flume was only used for three years before being abandoned. The reason was that the mine itself was closed after the discovery that most of the gold was unrecoverable, and the investors in the project only made $80,000 after investing over $1,000,000 into the mine and associated engineering works. After the closure of the mine, local residents reused the timber.

== Research and conservation ==
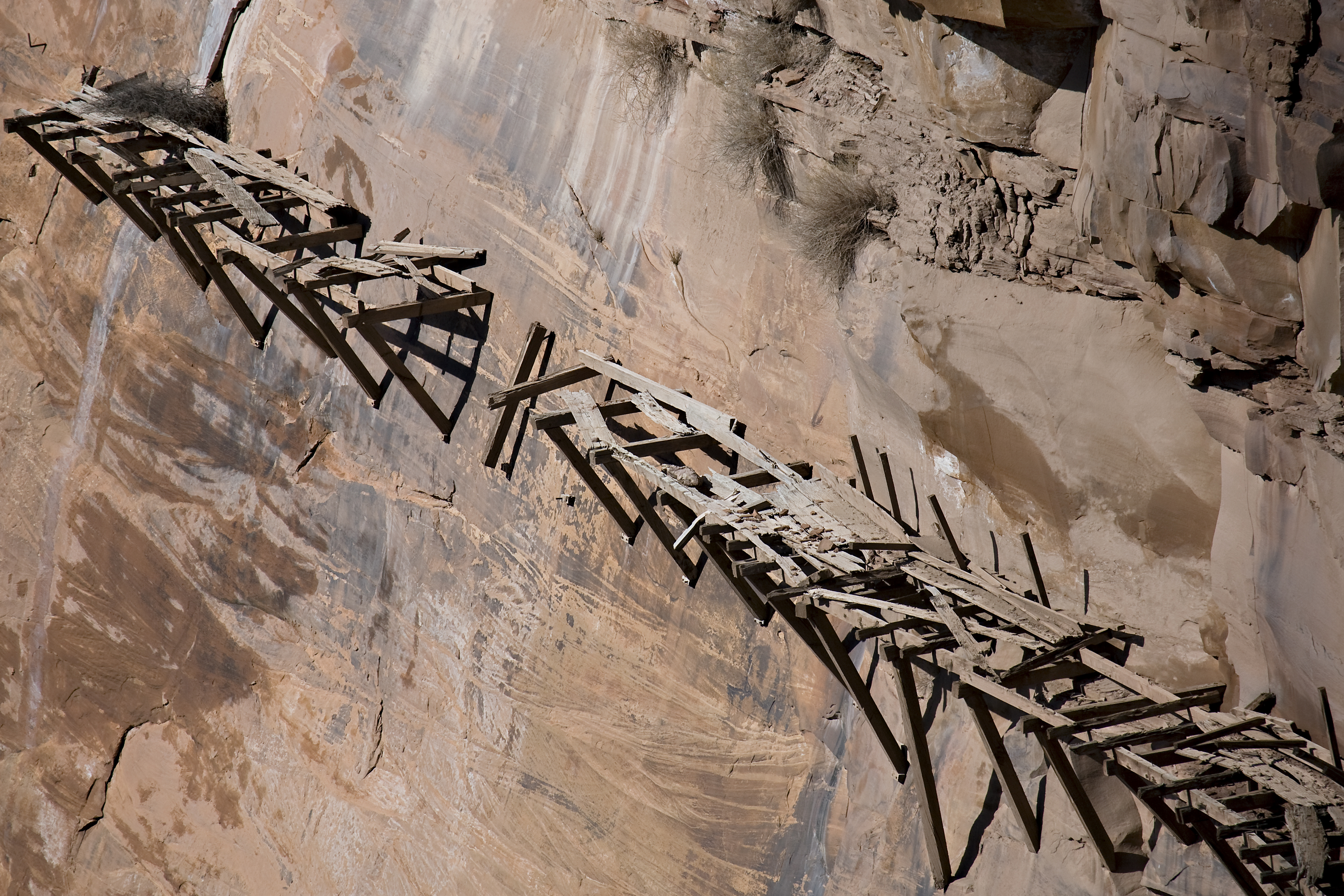
Close up view of the flume, showing the rods that supported the wood.

The Hanging Flume is in poor condition: it has been vandalized in places, some of its wood has been removed, and what remains has deteriorated, particularly where directly exposed to weather. The pine wood is vulnerable to decay and fungi. In April 2004, structural engineers rappelled down to the structure at seven locations to measure and evaluate it. They examined the design of the structure, particularly the bents, of which they identified five distinct types. This preliminary analysis is being used to consider a reconstruction of the flume incorporating the remaining structural elements.
