= Arizona breccia pipe uranium mineralization =

During the late 1970s and through the 1980s, Mohave and Coconino County, Arizona, immediately north and south of the Grand Canyon and west of the Navajo Indian Reservation were explored for Arizona breccia pipe uranium mineralization. The search area included the region between the Colorado River and the Utah border known as the “Arizona Strip”.

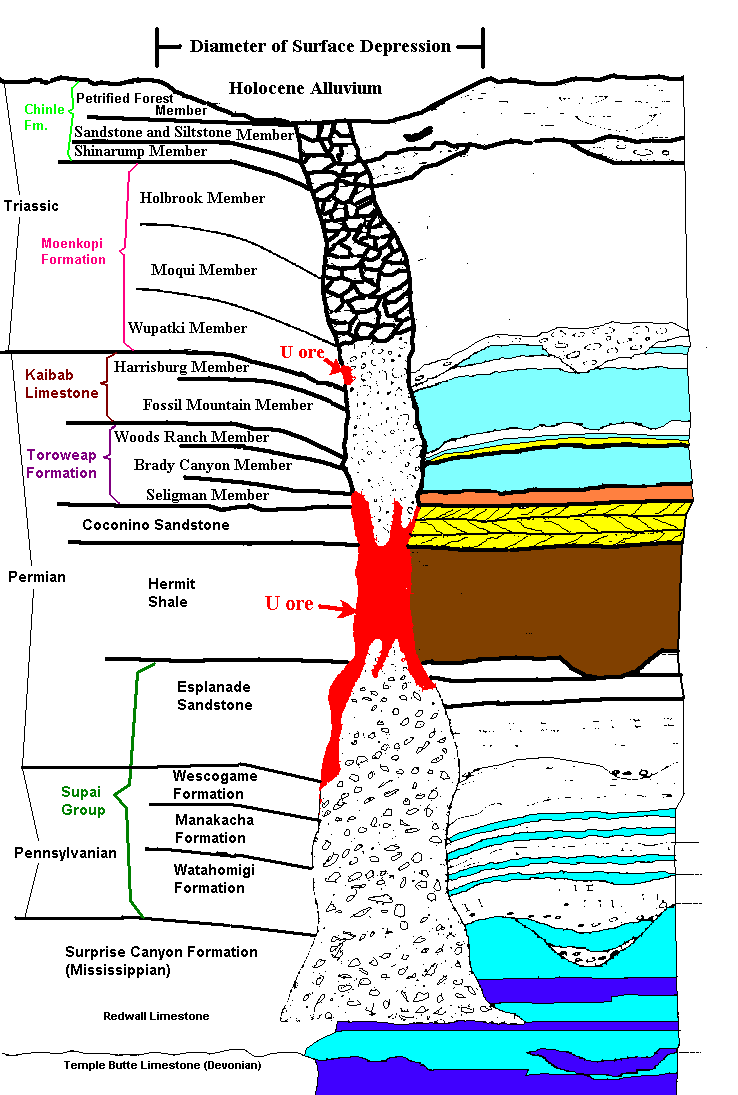
Cross-section of a breccia pipe (USGS)

== Geology ==
Collapse breccia pipes are vertical cylindrical bodies of broken sedimentary rock (breccia), down-dropped into caverns in underlying massive limestone. Uraninite, a reduced uranium ore mineral, accumulated within the permeable column of broken rock, forming a cylindrical and vertical (and stationary) rather than tabular and sub-horizontal (and migrating) uranium roll front deposit. Apparent mineralizing fluid flow direction was upward. As in roll front deposits, disseminated and massive sulfides are found on the downstream side of breccia pipe uranium accumulations (above the breccia pipe uranium ore).

The surface disturbance of collapse breccia pipe uranium mining has historically been remarkably small because of the high-grade, compact nature of the mineralization and use of underground waste rock back-fill procedures during breccia pipe mine development work. See Figures 6 through 9 of https://web.archive.org/web/20070913032821/http://www.libertystaruranium.com/sub.asp?sub_id=36&section_id=8 for photographs of reclaimed breccia pipe uranium mine sites. The same reference written by Dr. Karen Wenrich states, “Although these uranium grades are dwarfed by those of the Athabasca Basin unconformity deposits in Canada, it is significant that (1) the breccia pipe mining costs are significantly less for the Arizona deposits, and (2) these ore grades of 0.4-1% are as high or higher than any other global uranium-deposit type.”

== History ==
The earliest breccia pipe mined for uranium was the Orphan, a mineralized pipe exposed on the southern wall of the Grand Canyon within the Grand Canyon National Park. During the late 70s, Energy Fuels Nuclear, Inc. (founder Bob Adams and successor Oren Benton) began a concerted effort to locate and then mine further examples of this previously neglected class of uranium deposit. With the exploration success of Energy Fuels and the ensuing development of the early Hack 1 and 2, Pigeon, and Kanab North mines, competing exploration and mining companies soon entered northern Arizona. During the 1970s and 1980s, relatively large companies such as Gulf Resources, Pathfinder Mines Corporation, Rocky Mountain Energy Company, and Uranerz all competed with Energy Fuels Nuclear, Inc., for mineral rights in the predominantly public lands of the Arizona Strip. By 1989, at least 13 uranium-ore-bearing breccia pipes had been identified by various companies. Nearly all northern Arizona uranium exploration had stopped by that year, however, due to the low uranium price.

Each of the ore-bearing breccia pipes mined during the 1980s was developed by Energy Fuels, which shipped ore northeast to its White Mesa Mill in Blanding, Utah. According to the United States Geological Survey, Energy Fuels Nuclear, Inc., produced in excess of 19 million pounds of U_{3}O_{8} from seven mines through the 1980s.

The reason for uranium exploration and uranium mining in northern Arizona, during a period of low yellowcake price, was the high grade and compact nature of the uranium mineralization contained in some of the collapse breccia pipes in the region. In 1982, total production cost for breccia pipe uranium was about $10/lb U_{3}0_{8} concentrate that then sold for approximately $40/lb. Later inflation-corrected cost data published by EFN in the Canyon Mine Environmental Impact Statement confirms the 1982 total cost quotation. In 2007 US dollar terms, the total cost to produce a pound of U_{3}0_{8} from the average pipe was about $24. Average ore reserves for an individual mineralized pipe at that time were determined to be about 3.5 million pounds U_{3}0_{8}, with an average grade of about 0.6 percent U_{3}0_{8}, then giving the average economically mineralized pipe an approximate before-tax, undiscounted in-ground value of about $105 million (more than $225 million in 2007 US dollars). The breccia pipe mineral deposits range from 1000 to 1800 feet deep and have a vertical extent of up to 600 feet. The pipes typically have a 200-to-400-foot (61 to 122 m) diameter. A 1,000-to-1,600-foot-deep (300 to 490 m) shaft is usually required to access the deposits. In some cases where a mineralized pipe occurs near a deep canyon, a decline can be used instead of a shaft to access the ore during mining.

== Current activity ==
As of 2007, before the post-Fukushima price crash, there was an increase in price and demand for nuclear reactor fuel, making the Arizona Strip the site of high uranium mineral exploration. More than 500 breccia pipe targets in the Arizona Strip area were actively being explored by at least 11 mineral exploration companies. (May 25, 2007)

- DIR Exploration, Inc.: a privately held US company in the Kaibab Joint Venture with the public company, Takara Resources, Inc.; total breccia pipe target number is 204.
- Energy Fuels, Inc.: 25 targets.
- Energy Metals Corporation : 11 targets.
- Liberty Star Uranium and Metals Corporation : 343 targets.
- Mesa Uranium Corporation : 13 targets.
- Quaterra Resources, Inc.: 15 targets.
- SXR Uranium One, Inc.: company has just independently entered the area to begin conducting exploration work, but see the joint venture described below with Uranium Power Corporation.
- Tournigan Gold Corporation : 83 targets.
- Uranium Power Corporation : 14 wholly owned targets, and an additional 27 in joint venture with SXR Uranium One, Inc., for a total of 41.
- VANE Mineral Resources, Inc.: 38 targets.
- Northern Arizona Uranium Project : 4 targets

Largely because of their relatively high ore grade and compactness, the United States Geological Survey anticipates that Arizona collapse breccia pipes will be “…the major source of future uranium production within the United States."

== See also ==
- List of uranium mines
- Ore
- Ore genesis
- Uranium
- Uranium mining in Arizona
