= Uravan, Colorado =

Uranium mining ghost town in Montrose County, Colorado

- Mining ghost town
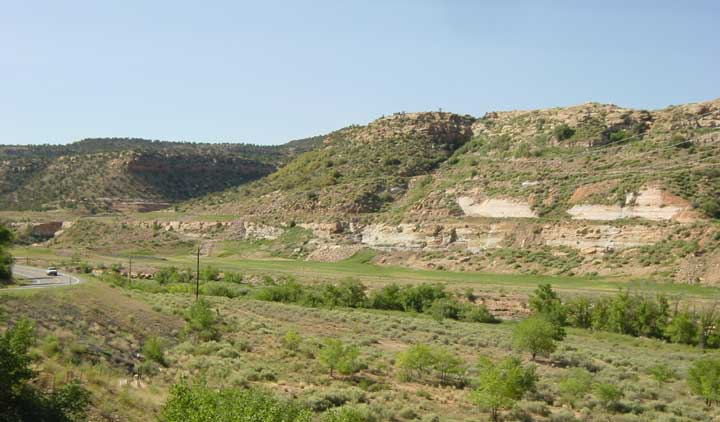
- The reclaimed Uravan townsite (at the base of sandstone outcrop) as it appeared in 2008

- Location within Colorado Location within the United States
- Coordinates: 38°22′06″N 108°44′11″W
- Country: United States
- State: Colorado
- County: Montrose
- Elevation: 4,990 ft (1,520 m)

Population (2010)
  - Total: 0
- Time zone: UTC-7 (Mountain (MST))
  - Summer (DST): UTC-6 (MDT)
- GNIS feature ID: 203153

Uravan (a contraction of uranium/vanadium) is a former uranium mining town in western Montrose County, Colorado, United States. The town was a company town established by U. S. Vanadium Corporation in 1936 to extract the rich vanadium ore in the region. As a byproduct of vanadium extraction, small amounts of uranium were also produced, at the time mostly used as a yellow pigment for ceramics.

The town was located approximately 90 miles (140 km) south-southwest of Grand Junction along the San Miguel River. At one time, over 800 people lived in Uravan, and the town housed a school, a trading center (store), medical facilities, tennis courts, a recreation center, and a pool. The school and some other facilities remained operational until at least 1983; however, Uravan was shut down by mid-1985, and no traces of its former buildings remain. Uravan is now an uninhabited, undeveloped Superfund site.

== Prehistory ==
There are several prehistoric sites near Uravan on the Colorado State Register of Historic Properties:

- Dolores Cave was inhabited from about 600 BC to AD 1400. A corn cob dated about AD 1500 was found in the site, which indicates that corn was grown in the area after the Ancient Pueblo People (Anasazi) abandoned their Colorado pueblos in the 13th century.
- Tabeguache Cave II is a large prehistoric rock shelter occupied from about AD 600 - 1500. There is also a Tabeguache Cave and two other rock shelters near Nucla, Colorado.

== History ==
=== Gold ===
In 1885, placer gold was discovered in a tributary of the San Miguel River, Mesa Creek, nine miles from Nucla, Colorado. The Montrose Placer Mining Company constructed the Hanging Flume on the east wall of Dolores River Canyon.

=== 20th century uranium mining ===
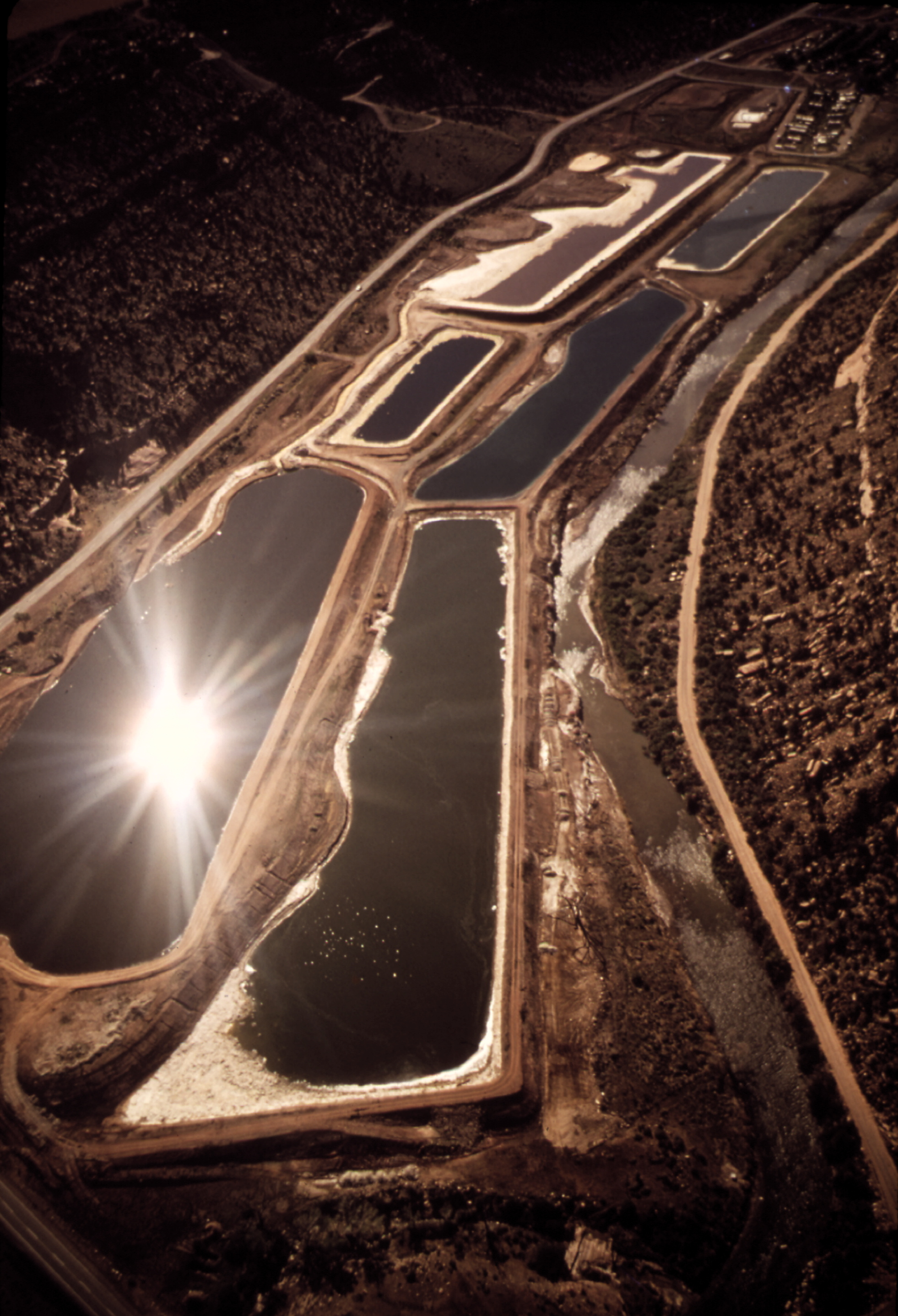
Holding ponds for uranium processing (1972)

During World War II, Uravan provided part of the uranium needed by the Manhattan Project for the first atomic bomb. Because of wartime secrecy the Manhattan Project would only publicly admit to purchasing the vanadium, and did not pay the uranium miners for the uranium ore (in a much later lawsuit, many miners were able to reclaim lost profits from the U.S. government).

In the beginning of the Cold War, to ensure adequate supplies of uranium for national defense, the United States Congress passed the U.S. Atomic Energy Act of 1946, creating the U.S. Atomic Energy Commission (AEC) which had the power to withdraw prospective uranium mining land from public purchase, and also to manipulate the price of uranium to meet national needs. By setting a high price for uranium ore, the AEC created a uranium "boom" in the early 1950s, which attracted many prospectors to the Four Corners region of the country. Uravan's fortunes grew as it became one of the major "yellowcake boomtowns" in the region.

American military requirements of uranium declined in the 1960s, and the government completed its uranium procurement program by the end of 1970. Simultaneously, a new market emerged: commercial nuclear power plants. However, the U.S. domestic uranium mining industry collapsed in the late 1970s and early 1980s, due to lack of new nuclear power plants, and to low-price uranium imported from Canada.

The town had been in decline for several years; the decision was made to close Uravan in 1985 and commence a large-scale clean-up of the entire site. Environmental cleanup of the site commenced in 1986 and was completed in 2008. All the buildings have been removed and the site regraded and replanted, about 800 inhabitants had to move. All that remains is a turnoff and interpretive sign along State Highway 141. Former residents of Uravan raised funds to preserve a boarding house and recreation center on the old town site, but Dow Chemical, which acquired Union Carbide, the owner of the Uravan mill, in 1999, burned them down in 2007 due to fears of radiative contamination.

== Future ==
On May 6, 2012, the Montrose County Board of County Commissioners signed the Omnibus Agreement with Dow Chemical, giving them three tracts of land: Ballpark Parcel #1, a 133-acre (54 ha) plot between Hwy. 141 and the San Miguel River; Ballpark Parcel #2, approximately ten acres (4.0 ha) northwest of the first parcel; and the townsite property, located between County Roads EE22 and Y11.

Montrose County agreed to accept this property on behalf of the Rimrocker Historical Society of Western Montrose County, which has worked since 1990 to preserve and interpret the history of Uravan. The Rimrocker Historical Society and Montrose County entered into a long-term lease on May 1, 2013 for a 17-acre (6.9 ha) section of Ballpark parcel #1, with the intention of building a museum and campground on the property.

The Rimrocker Historical Society of Western Montrose County hosts the annual Uranium History Celebration and Reunion Picnic at Historic Uravan, Colorado every August. Over 1,000 people attended the 100th anniversary of the original Joe Jr. Mill in 2012.

== See also ==
- List of ghost towns in Colorado
- Uranium mining in Colorado
