= Charles Steen =

American geologist and politician

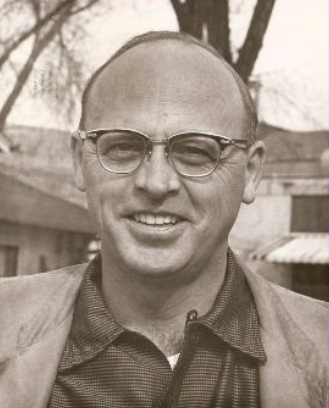
Charles A. Steen (1919-2006)

Charles Augustus Steen (December 1, 1919 – January 1, 2006) was a geologist who made and later lost a fortune after discovering a rich uranium deposit in Utah during the uranium boom of the early 1950s.

== Early years ==
Charlie Steen was born in 1919 in Caddo, Stephens County, Texas, the son of Charles A. and Rosalie Wilson Steen, and attended high school in Houston. As a teen Steen worked summers for a construction company that helped finance his education; this is the same company that his first stepfather Lisle had died working at. He went on to study at John Tarleton Agricultural College in Stephenville, Texas, where he met his wife Minnie Lee Holland, and in 1940 transferred to the College of Mines and Metallurgy of the University of Texas, receiving a Bachelor of Arts degree in geology in 1943.

Ineligible for the draft because of his poor eyesight, Steen spent World War II working as a petroleum geologist in the Amazon Basin of Bolivia and Peru. Returning to Texas in 1945, he married Minnie Lee ("M.L."). He started graduate school at the University of Chicago but after a year returned to Houston to take a job doing field work for the Standard Oil Company of Indiana. However, within two years he had been fired for insubordination and had trouble getting a job as a geologist anywhere in the oil industry.

== The uranium boom ==
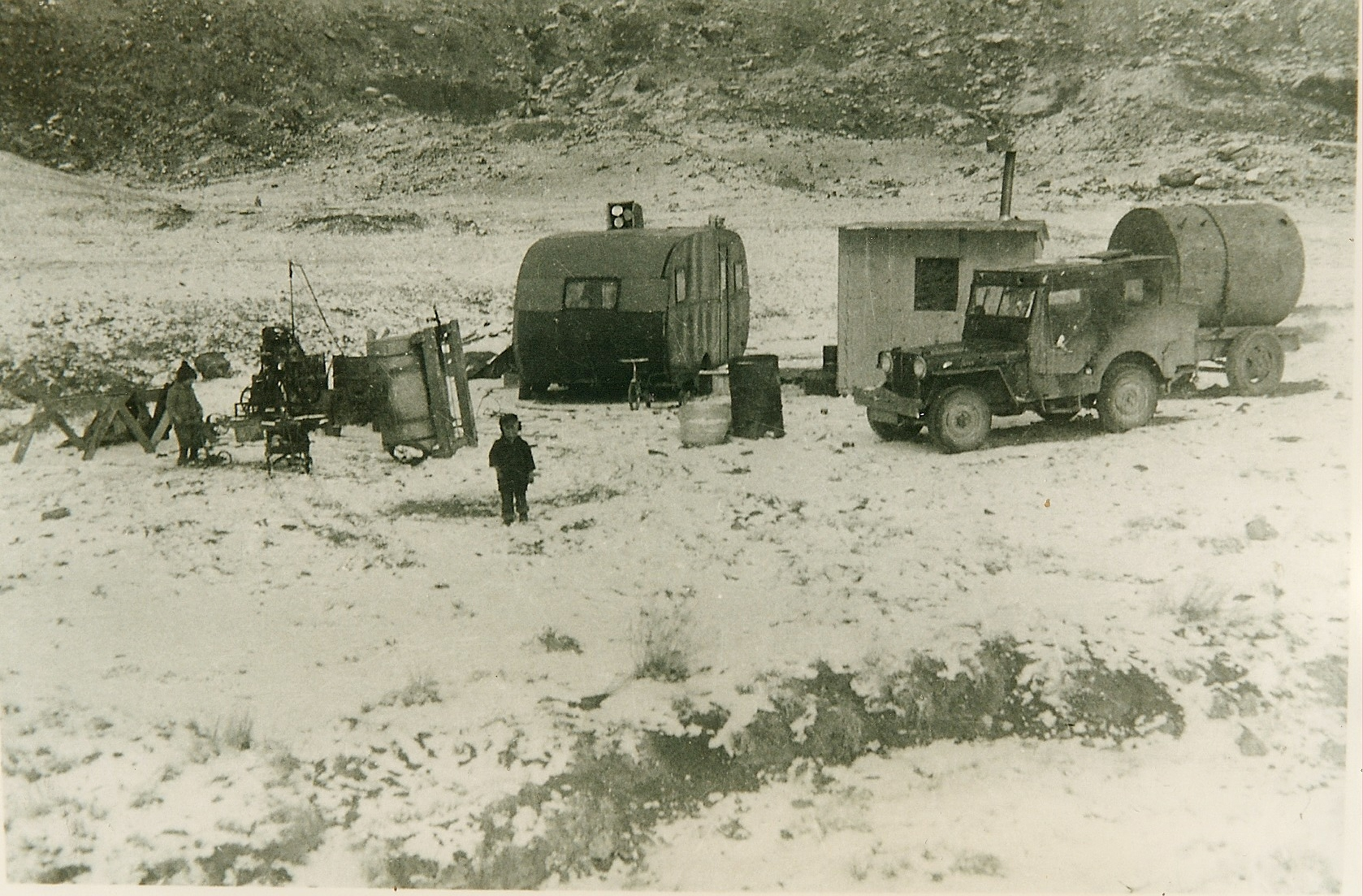
Steen's camp at Yellow Cat (near Cisco, Utah) in 1950

While unemployed, Steen read in the December 1949 issue of The Engineering and Mining Journal that the United States federal government had issued incentives for domestic uranium prospectors. Under the Atomic Energy Act of 1946, the U.S. Atomic Energy Commission had the authority to withdraw lands from the private sector in order to examine them as possible sites for uranium mining. During World War II, the Manhattan Project had received most of its uranium from foreign sources in Canada and the Belgian Congo. However, it had also received some from vanadium miners in the American Southwest, where uranium was often a by-product of mining (before the atomic bomb uranium was not a valuable metal). There was a concern that the United States would not have enough domestic supply of uranium for its nuclear weapons program.

In the late 1940s and early 1950s the Atomic Energy Commission established itself as the only legal buyer of uranium in the U.S. and artificially manipulated prices to reflect their current uranium needs. By raising the price of uranium, they created an incentive for prospectors in the Four Corners region.

Despite the fact that his three sons, Johnny, Andy and Charles Jr. were all less than four years old and his wife was expecting another child, Steen borrowed $1,000 from his mother and headed for the Colorado Plateau, determined to strike it rich. After being in Colorado for several months, the Steens moved into a tarpaper shack in Cisco, Utah. Steen and his family were struggling to get by and were often hungry so Charlie made the decision to move his family to Tucson, Arizona. Steen worked as a carpenter in Tucson for about a year before he returned to his claims in Utah. He and his family once again packed up and headed to their claims. This final trip back to Utah would be the most detrimental for the family because Steen's wife contracted pneumonia, and her medical bills consumed the $350 remaining from the sale of Steen's trailer.

Steen could not afford the standard radiation-detecting equipment used by uranium prospectors - the Geiger counter. Instead, he used a secondhand diamond drill rig and his geologic training for his prospecting. At the time, each prospector had his own idiosyncratic theory about where to find uranium. The uranium industry was composed primarily of individual prospectors and geologists who would attempt to find a large deposit and either mine it for themselves or mine it for a large company (such as Union Carbide) who would transport the ore from the mine to the uranium mill where it could be converted into yellowcake. Steen's theory on uranium deposits was that they would collect in anticlinal structures in the same manner as oil, which others on the Plateau dismissed as "Steen's Folly".

== Mi Vida uranium deposit ==
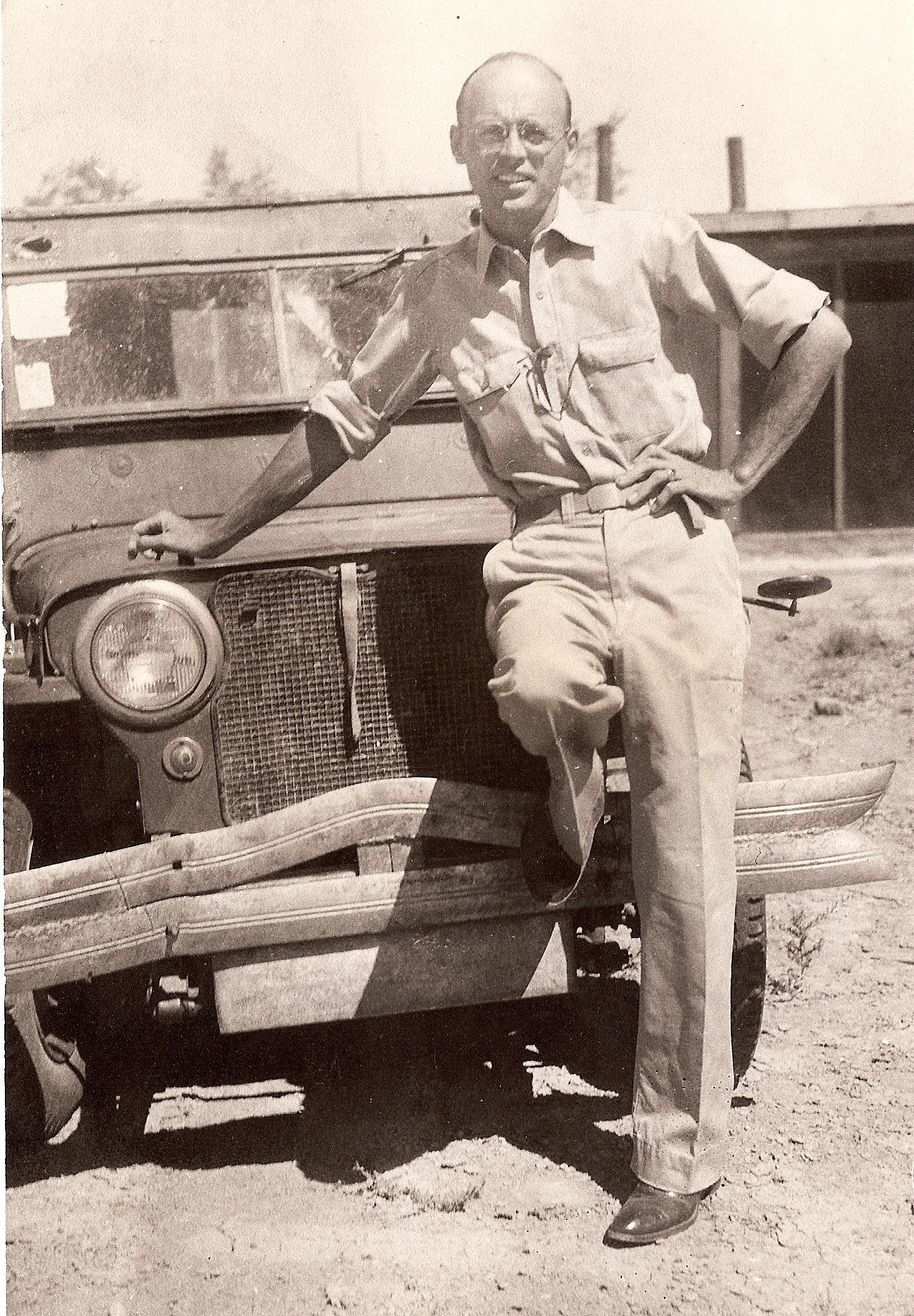
Steen the day after the discovery at "Mi Vida"

On July 6, 1952, Steen reached uranium, however he didn't realize until three weeks later. He was drilling down through the layers of sandstone when his drill bit broke off at a depth of 197 feet, just 3 feet short of his goal. Finding this massive deposit of uranium ore only became apparent when he took a piece of the blackish core he found while drilling weeks earlier back to Cisco. He stopped to fill up his jeep and decided to have the core tested by a friend with a Geiger counter and they found that the piece made the Geiger counter needle fluctuate wildly. The high grade uranium deposit was located at Big Indian Wash of Lisbon Valley, southeast of Moab, Utah (38.19000°N 109.26000°W). Sometimes recognized as one of the most important deposits of any kind found during the last century, the claim was named the "Mi Vida" mine (My Life) by Steen. The Mi Vida mine was one of the first big strikes of the uranium boom. Steen made millions off his claims, and provoked a "Uranium Rush" of prospectors into the Four Corners region, similar to the Gold Rush of the 1850s in California.

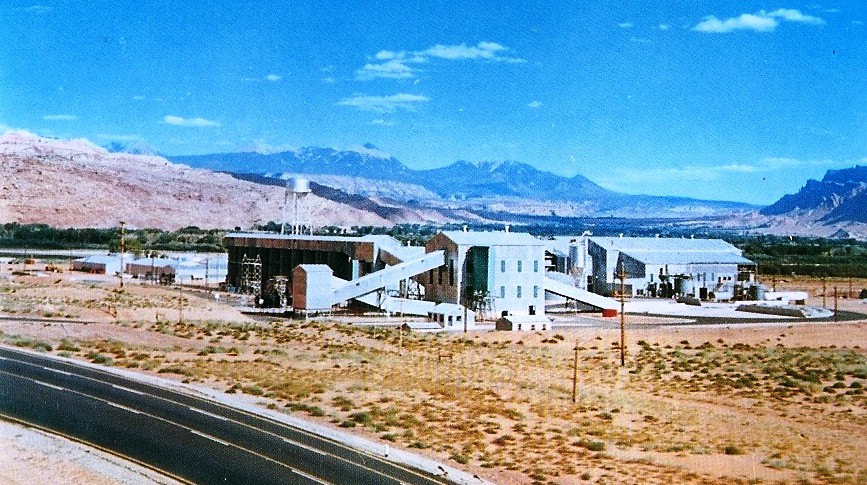
Steen's $11 million Uranium Reduction Co. (Atlas Mill), Moab, Utah

In Moab, Steen built a $250,000 hilltop mansion to replace his tarpaper shack, with a swimming pool, greenhouse, and servants' quarters. As of 2022 the home he built still stands and has been transformed into a restaurant called The Sunset Grill, named because the structure looks over the valley towards the sunset in the west. He also formed a number of companies to continue his uranium work, including the Utex Exploration Company, the Moab Drilling Company, the Mi Vida Company, Big Indian Mines, Inc., and later the Uranium Reduction Company. He made his money well-known, inviting the entire population of Moab to annual parties in a local airport hangar, having his original worn prospecting boots bronzed, and flying to Salt Lake City in his private plane for weekly rumba lessons. He donated $50,000 towards a new hospital in Moab and gave land for churches and schools.

== Political involvement ==
Steen was elected to the Utah State Senate in 1958 as a Republican, but quickly became disillusioned with politics. He resigned from office in 1961 and moved to a ranch near Reno, Nevada, building a 27,000 square foot (2,500 m^{2}) mansion near the residence of the Comstock millionaire miner, Sandy Bowers. He sold the Utex Exploration Company and the Uranium Reduction Company in 1962.

== After the uranium rush ==
By the late 1950s, the US government had enough uranium for its needs and had stopped supporting high prices of the ore, killing the market by 1960. Steen attempted to diversify his interests by investing in Arabian horse breeding, a marble quarry, an airplane factory, a pickle plant, and real estate. He met with financial losses and misfortune. In 1968 he filed for bankruptcy after the Internal Revenue Service seized his assets to pay back taxes. In 1971 he suffered a severe head injury working on a copper prospect.

== Death ==
Long-suffering from Alzheimer's disease, Steen died on January 1, 2006, in Loveland, Colorado. Minnie Lee died on July 14, 1997. Their ashes were scattered at the Mi Vida mine site.

== Legacy ==
Steen's legacy lives on through his four sons who were once the recipients of a $130 million fortune that their father lost after the decline of the uranium market in the late 1950s. Although Steen lost most of his fortune after the uranium crash due to poor money management and frivolous spending, he is still recognized for his Cold War contributions for supplying the United States with all of the uranium it needed for its weapons program. His story about finding the Mi Vida mine inspired two films and several books along with getting the small desert town of Moab, Utah, on the map as "The Uranium Capital of the World" and the "Richest Town in America". After Steen struck it rich, he requested that Congress allow him to build his own mill without government funding, resulting in the only major atomic facility to be privately funded.

On November 4, 2016, a historical marker commemorating the Lisbon Valley's uranium heritage and noting Charlie Steen's discovery was dedicated on the Anticline Overlook road off U.S. 191. The marker was funded entirely by private donations. Artist Michael Ford Dunton created an arch to frame the historical marker and the view to the location of the Mi Vida mine, seven miles east of the marker.

== See also ==
- Moab uranium mill tailings pile
- Uranium mining in Utah
