= Haul No =

American environmental activist organization

Haul No! is an environmental activist organization led by Navajo members in opposition of the transport of Uranium through Navajo and Havasupai land. The group targets its opposition against Energy Fuels which operates the Pinyon Plain uranium mine in the Grand Canyon and White Mesa Uranium Mill in Blanding, Utah.

== Background ==
The Havasupai have been resisting the operation of the Pinyon mine since the 1980s. In August 2024, Joe Biden banned uranium mining in the area, but Pinyon mine was granted an exception later in his term. Pinyon mine lies on Kaibab National Forest which is not part of the official Havasupai territory, but it is on their ancestral land.

== Protests ==
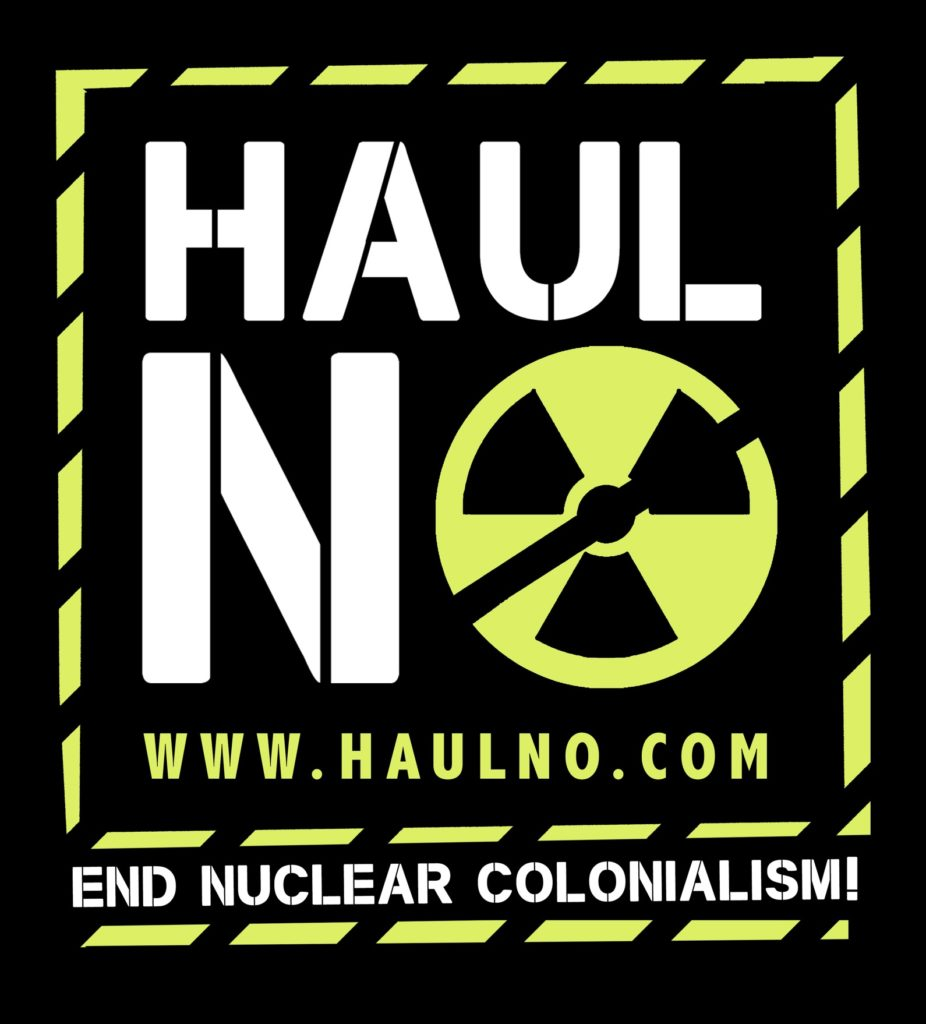
Haul No logo

Haul No organized protests featuring their slogan "Haul No" in Flagstaff, Arizona and along the haul route that Energy Fuels uses to transport uranium from their mine to their mill. At the protest, Buu Nygren, the Navajo Nation's president, stated that uranium mining was historically harmful to the Navajo and that their land has more than 500 abandoned uranium mines. During the protests, Havasupai stated that the mining operation threatened their drinking water which is supplied by an aquifer beneath the mine and the safety and peace of their sacred sites near the mine. The Center for Biological Diversity identified risks to drinking water and wildlife from the mine and regular flooding in the mine.

== Transportation Agreement ==
After the protests, Energy Fuels agreed to stop transporting uranium through Navajo land until they came to an agreement with the tribe. An agreement was reached in January 2025, in which Energy Fuels agreed to additional safety measures and agreed to transport uranium mine cleanup materials at their own cost to the Navajo nation to help address the abandoned mines. EF must also give the Navajo notice before transporting uranium, but the Havasupai were not included in the talks and are not required to be given notice.
