= Moab uranium mill tailings pile =

Radioactive waste site

Coordinates: 38.5997°N 109.5976°W

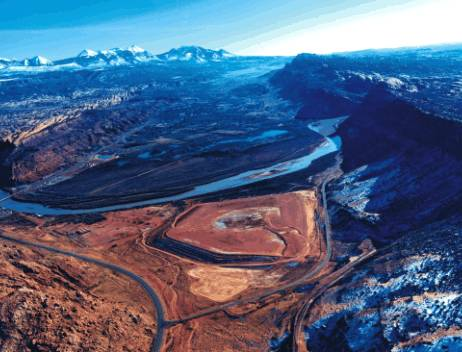
Aerial view of the Atlas Mill Site near Moab, Utah, prior to the removal of the tailings pile

The Moab uranium mill tailings pile is a uranium mill waste pond situated alongside the Colorado River, currently under the control of the U.S. Department of Energy. Locals refer to it as the Moab Tailings Pile. In 1952 U.S. geologist Charles Steen found the largest uranium deposit in the United States near Moab, Utah. The uranium was processed by the Uranium Reduction Company and the waste slurry was stored in an unlined pond adjacent to the river. The Uranium Reduction Company was sold in 1962 and renamed the Atlas Uranium Mill.

After the mill was closed in 1984 the pond was capped. There was also a pile of mine tailings that was over 90 ft (27 m) tall at its highest point. It was believed that pollutants from the waste tailings were leaching into the river, inferred from the lethal effect on fish, primarily from high concentrations of ammonia. The site was transferred to the United States Department of Energy for remediation under Title 1 of the Uranium Mill Tailings Radiation Control Act in 2001. In August 2005 the Department of Energy announced that 11.9 million short tons (10.8 million tonnes) of radioactive tailings would be moved, mostly by rail, and buried in a lined hole. The proposed holding site is public land at Crescent Junction, Utah, about 30 mi (48 km) from the Colorado River. In February 2006 a final Environmental Impact Statement met with United States Environmental Protection Agency approval. The cost of the relocation was originally estimated to be $300 million, but 2008 Department of Energy estimates were in excess of $720 million.

The contract for the first transfer of the tailings was awarded to North Wind Portage, Inc. and the first relocation took place in April of 2009.

== DOE plan for relocation ==
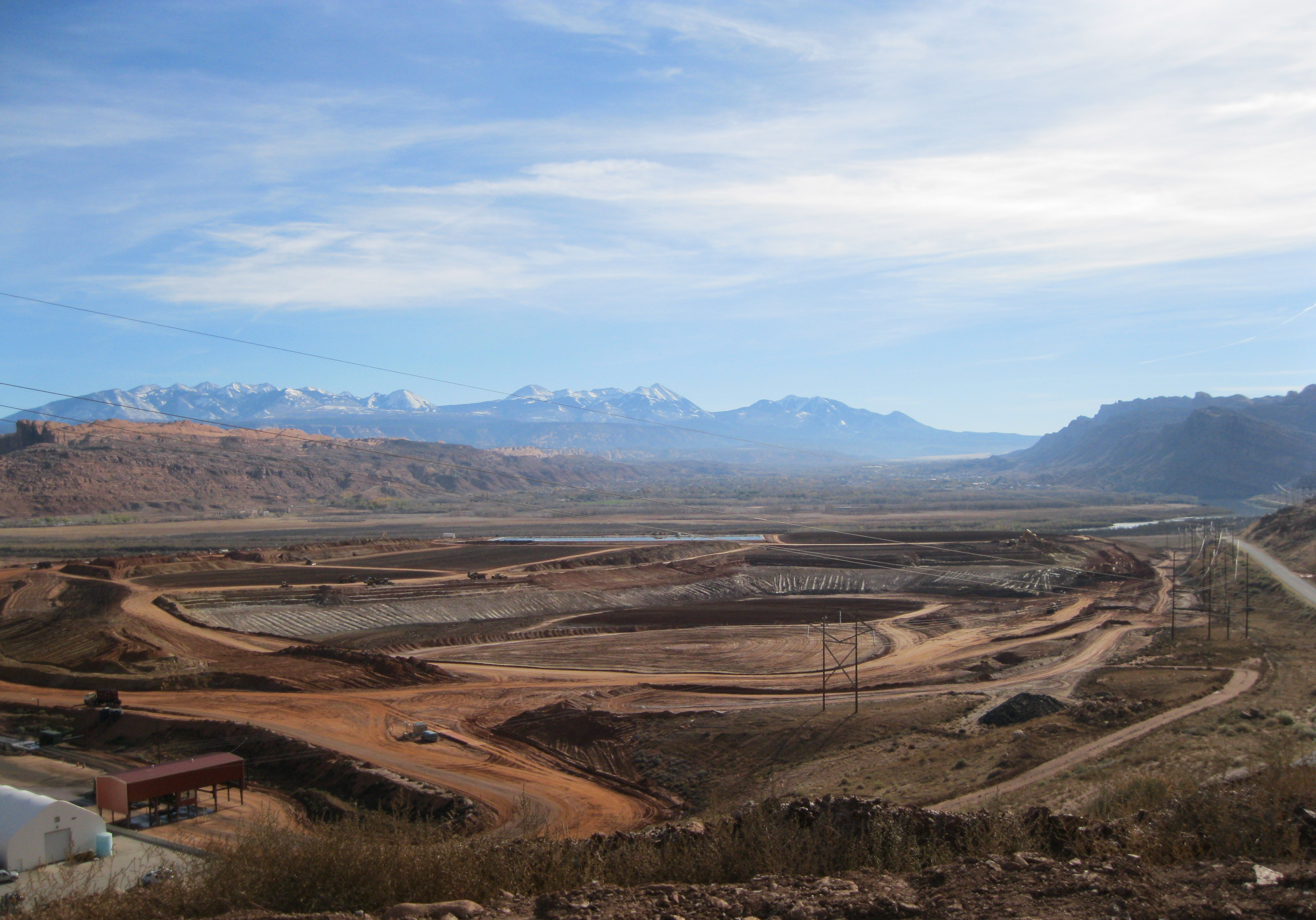
The tailings pile in November, 2010, during the DOE's excavation and cleanup

The Department of Energy contracted the relocation effort to North Wind Portage, Inc who has hauled over 16 million tons of the tailings from the current Atlas Uranium Mill site to a disposal cell near the town of Crescent Junction, Utah as of June 2026.

The "tailings are excavated and conditioned in drying beds to reach the optimal moisture content for disposal. The tailings are then placed in steel containers with locking lids for transport to Crescent Junction. A gantry crane is used to transfer containers to and from the train at Moab. The Moab Project is currently shipping four trains a week, each carrying up to 156 containers. The Project is currently estimated to be completed in 2029."

A well field is located between the tailing pile and the river, which extracts and purifies groundwater before it enters the Colorado river. As of February 2014 799,000 pounds (362,000 kg) of ammonia and 3,990 pounds (1,810 kg) of uranium had been extracted from the wells. During low water periods, fresh water is injected into the wells.

=== Planned cleanup scope 2021-2031 ===
"Over the next several years, DOE expects to ship nearly one million tons of uranium mill tailings annually to the Crescent Junction disposal site. As a result, DOE expects to complete the relocation and disposal of the pile by CY 2029. It will take an additional two years to complete the restoration of the Moab Site, dispose of potentially contaminated equipment and intermodal containers, and to install the cover on the disposal cell."

"DOE also plans to continue transportation and disposal of oversize debris from the Moab Site, including 14 autoclaves decommissioned by the Atlas Minerals Corporation. They are assumed to weigh at least 40 tons each and could be filled with asbestos. Transportation of oversize debris will continue through CY 2028."

== Disposal site ==
The tailings and other contaminated material are being buried in a specialized disposal cell near Crescent Junction, Utah, northeast of the junction of Interstate 70 and U.S. Route 191, about 30 miles from the tailing pile. Excavation occurs in phases. Each phase is about 45 acres (18 ha) and is excavated to about 25 feet (7.6 m). The contaminated material is first covered by a minimum one-foot (0.30 m) layer of interim fill, then by a four-foot (1.2 m) radon barrier composed of weathered mancos shale, a six-inch (150 mm) layer of sandy gravel as an infiltration and biointrusion layer, and 3 feet (0.91 m) of a frost protection layer composed of both soil and weathered shale. The cell is then topped with 6 inches (150 mm) of rock. Cover material is sourced locally and from Fremont Junction, Utah.

When finished, the cell will be about 5,200 feet (1,600 m) long and 2,400 feet (730 m) wide. It is estimated to be about 25 feet (7.6 m) above ground and will be fenced. Currently the DOE owns 500 acres (200 ha) of land and has another 936 acres (379 ha) in a 20-year withdrawal for the disposal cell, buffer space, support area, and access road.
