= Energy Fuels Inc. =

Canadian mining company

Energy Fuels Inc. is a Canadian-domiciled uranium mining and refining company headquartered in Colorado. It operates the Pinyon Plain uranium mine in the Grand Canyon, the La Sal mine near La Sal, Utah and White Mesa Uranium Mill in Blanding, Utah. From 2018 to 2023, the company contributed more than half the US uranium production.

In 2025, Energy Fuels commenced producing rare earth element oxides at its White Mesa Mill at pilot scale. It is currently partnered with North Carolina-based rare earth magnet manufacturer Vulcan Elements.

== History ==
Energy Fuels was established in 2006.

== Key people ==
Energy Fuels is governed by a board of directors and a number of executives.

The CEO is Mark S. Chalmers. Ross Bhappu is company president. David C. Frydenlund is the executive vice president, chief legal officer, and corporate secretary. Curtis H. Moore is senior vice president of marketing and development. Nathan Longenecker is senior vice president and general counsel. Nathan Bennett is chief financial officer.

The board of directors is chaired by Bruce D. Hansen, and its members include Mark Chalmers, J. Birks Bovaird, Benjamin Eshleman III, Barbara Filas, Jaqueline Herrera, Dennis Higgs, Alex Morrison, and Michael Stirzaker.

== White Mesa ==
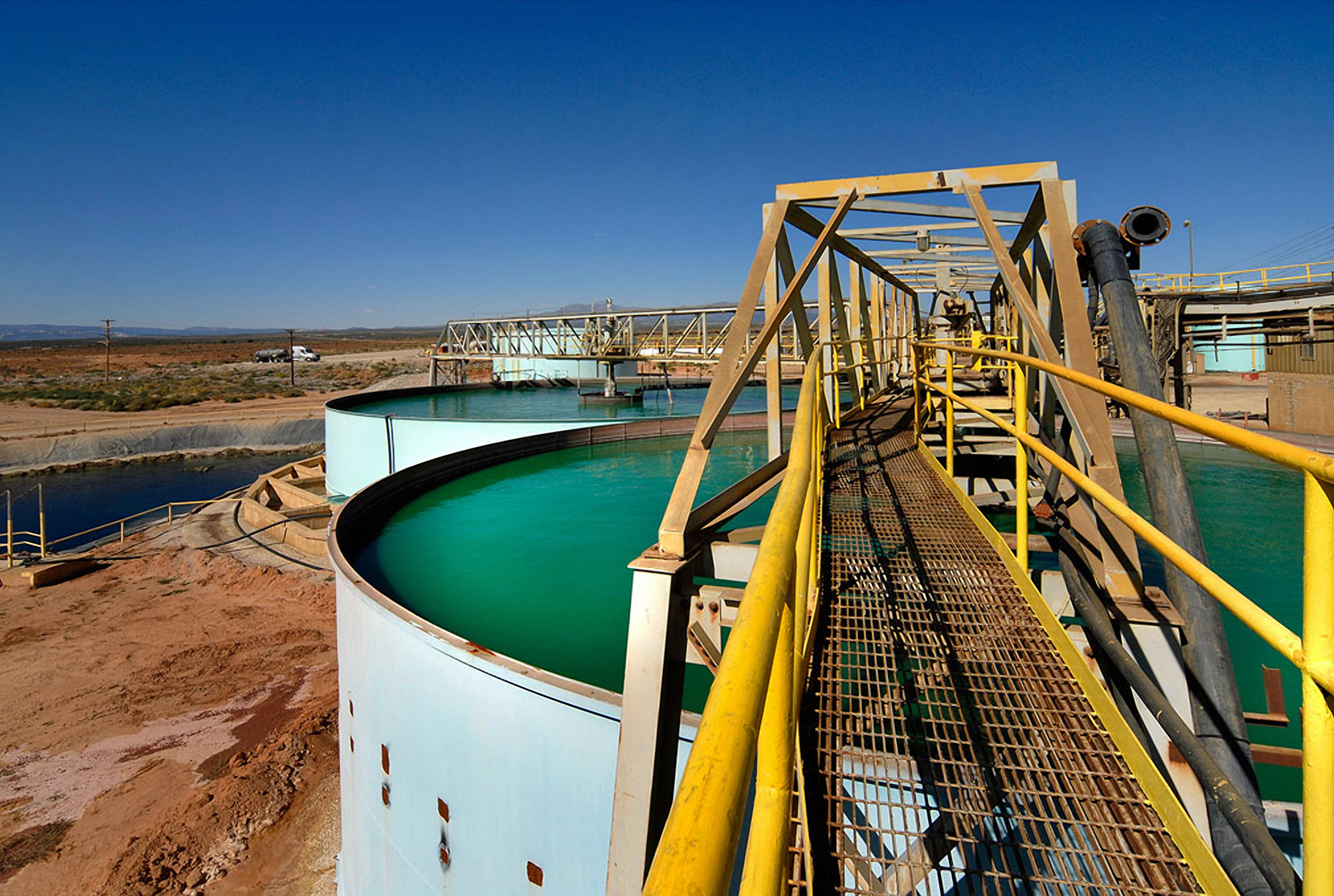
White Mesa uranium mill

The White Mesa mill was first opened in 1980. Uranium mills grind uranium ore and apply chemical processes to convert it to yellowcake uranium. The White Mesa mill receives uranium ore from the La Sal and Pinyon mines. A batch processing of uranium ore to yellowcake takes about seven days. The chemical process uses water from on-site wells and sulfuric acid. The radioactive waste from this process is stored on-site in containment ponds. When the ponds are full, they are covered with dirt.

== Pinyon Plain ==
Energy Fuels owns and operates the Pinyon Plain Uranium Mine in the Kaibab National Forest. The mine was formerly known as Canyon mine due to being 10 miles south of the Grand Canyon. The Havasupai, Grand Canyon Trust, and Sierra Club engaged in a multi decade legal battle which ended in favor of Energy Fuels in 2022. In August 2024, Joe Biden banned uranium mining in the area, but Pinyon mine was granted an exception later in his term.

== Navajo Transportation Agreement ==
In 2024, Energy Fuels responded to 'Haul No' protests against their operations and a Navajo policy against uranium shipment in their territory by halting transports until they came to an agreement with the tribe. The agreement reached in January 2025, holds Energy Fuels responsible for additional safety measures and transport of uranium mine cleanup materials at their own cost to the Navajo nation to help address abandoned mines from previous decades of mining on Navajo land. EF must also give the Navajo notice before transporting uranium.
