= Pine Nut mine =

Uranium mine in Arizona

- Location within Arizona
- Location: Arizona, United States; 36°30′10.7″N 112°43′57.6″W
- Products: uranium
- Opened: 1986
- Company: Energy Fuels Nuclear Inc.

The Pine Nut mine is a large uranium mine located in the southern part of the United States in Mohave County, Arizona. It is located just north of the Colorado River outside the Grand Canyon National Park. Pine Nut represents one of the largest uranium reserves in the United States having estimated reserves of 24.8 million tonnes of ore grading 0.68% uranium.
