= Roc Creek =

Stream in Montrose County, Colorado, US

Coordinates: 38°27′8″N 108°51′41″W

Roc Creek, also known as Taylor Creek, is a stream in Montrose County, Colorado, Grand County, Utah, and San Juan County, Utah. The mouth of the stream is in Red Canyon, Colorado, where it flows into Dolores River.

In 2013, a report by the Dolores River Dialogue stated that the stream has been impaired due to levels of iron, copper, and e. coli in the water which may compromise the native fish population in the Dolores River.
