= Carnotite =

Radioactive mineral

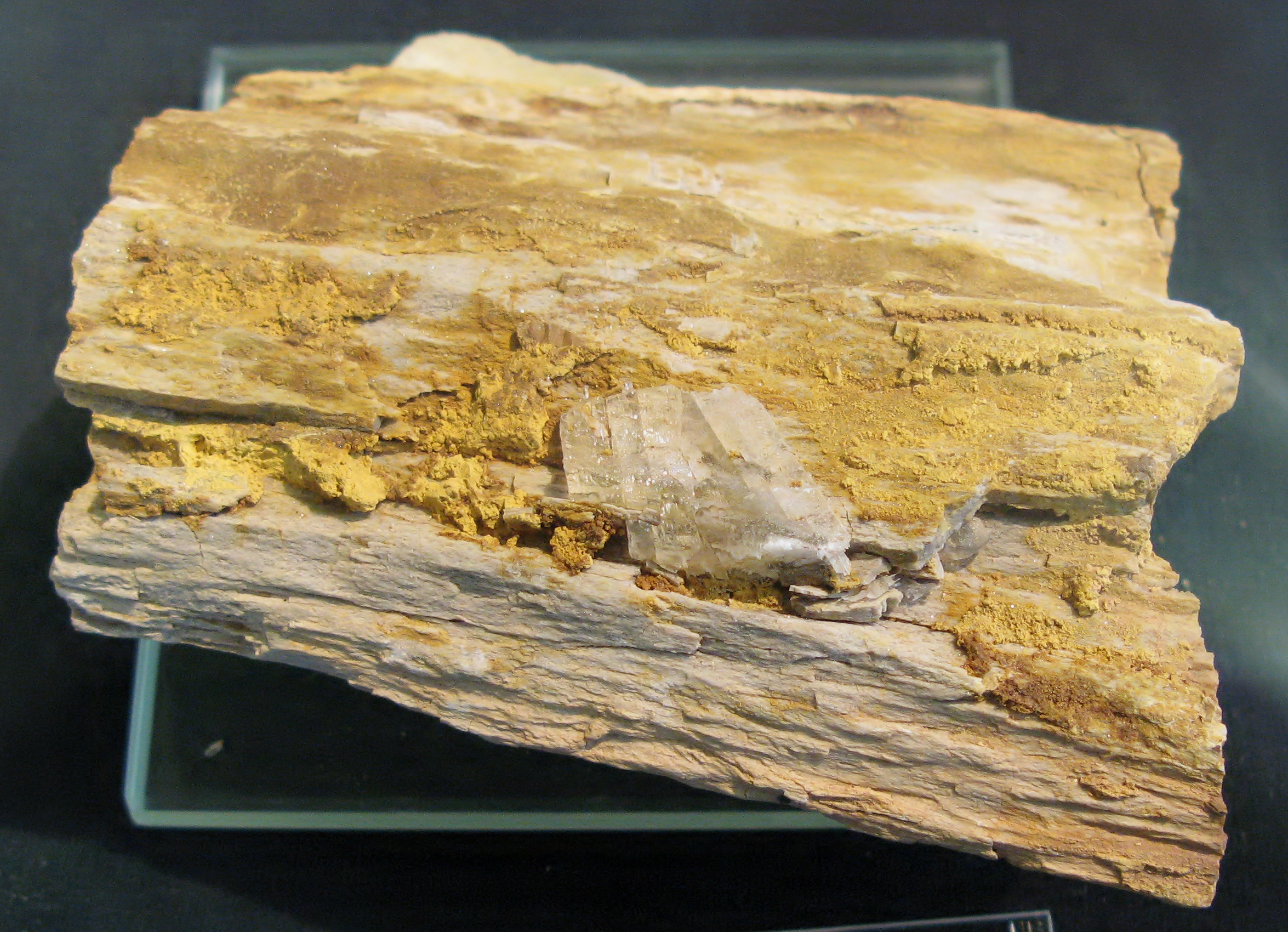
- Carnotite in fossilized wood from St. George, Utah

General
- Category: Vanadate mineral
- Formula: K_{2}(UO_{2})_{2} (VO_{4})_{2}·3H_{2}O
- IMA symbol: Cnt
- Strunz classification: 4.HB.05
- Crystal system: Monoclinic
- Crystal class: Prismatic (2/m) (same H-M symbol)
- Space group: P2_{1}/a
- Unit cell: a = 10.47 Å, b = 8.41 Å, c = 6.91 Å; β = 103.83°; Z = 2

Identification
- Color: Bright yellow to lemon-yellow, may be greenish yellow.
- Crystal habit: Crusts, earthy masses, foliated and granular aggregates.
- Twinning: On {001} as both twin and composition plane
- Cleavage: Perfect on {001}, micaceous
- Fracture: uneven
- Mohs scale hardness: 2
- Luster: Dull, earthy; silky when crystalline
- Streak: yellow
- Diaphaneity: Semitransparent
- Specific gravity: 4.70
- Optical properties: Biaxial (−)
- Refractive index: n_{α}=1.750 – 1.780, n_{β}=1.901 – 2.060, n_{γ}=1.920 – 2.080
- Birefringence: δ = 0.200
- 2V angle: Measured: 43° to 60°, Calculated: 26° to 36°
- Other characteristics: Radioactive, not fluorescent

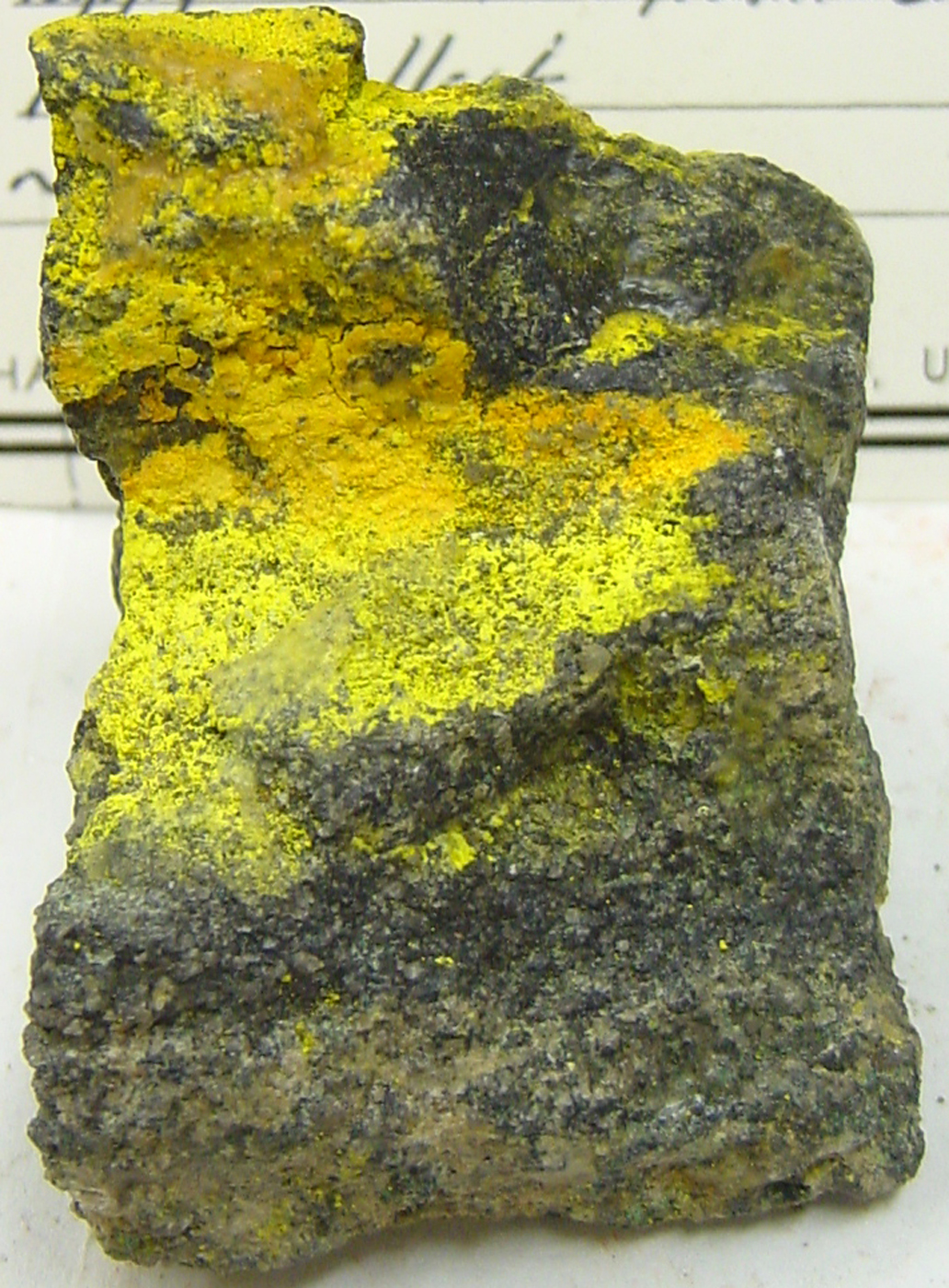
Carnotite from the Happy Jack Mine, Moab, Utah

Carnotite is a potassium uranium vanadate mineral with chemical formula K_{2}(UO_{2})_{2}(VO_{4})_{2}·3H_{2}O. The water content can vary and small amounts of calcium, barium, magnesium, iron, and sodium are often present. It is a major ore of uranium. It is slightly radioactive.

== Occurrence ==
Carnotite is a bright greenish-yellow mineral that occurs typically as crusts and flakes in sandstones. Amounts as low as one percent will color the sandstone a bright yellow. The high uranium content makes carnotite an important uranium ore. It is a secondary vanadium and uranium mineral usually found in sedimentary rocks in arid climates.

In the United States it is an important ore of uranium in the Colorado Plateau region of the United States where it occurs as disseminations in sandstone and concentrations around petrified logs. It also occurs in the U.S. states of Wyoming, Colorado, South Dakota, Nevada, Arizona, and Utah. It also occurs incidentally in Grants, New Mexico, and Carbon County, Pennsylvania.

Carnotite is reported in Congo (Kinshasa), Morocco, Australia (Radium Hill) and Kazakhstan. In Pakistan carnotite occurs in the Upper Miocene middle Siwaliks sandstone (Dhokpathan Formation), in the vicinity of Takhat Nasrati, Karak District.

== Name and discovery ==
The mineral was first described in 1899 by French scientists M. M. C. Freidel and E. Cumenge, who identified it in specimens from Roc Creek in Montrose County, Colorado, United States. It is named for Marie Adolphe Carnot (1839–1920), French mining engineer and chemist.

== Uses ==
Carnotite is an ore of uranium. Before the nuclear reactor was invented in 1942 it was mined primarily for radium or vanadium.

The mineral was used to produce quack devices involving radioactive substances.

== Related mineral species ==
Several related mineral species exist, including: margaritasite ((Cs,K,H_{3}O)_{2}(UO_{2})(VO_{4})_{2}·H_{2}O) and tyuyamunite, (Ca(UO_{2})_{2}(VO_{4})_{2}·5-8H_{2}O).

== See also ==
- List of minerals
- List of minerals named after people
