= Metarauchite =

Autunite mineral

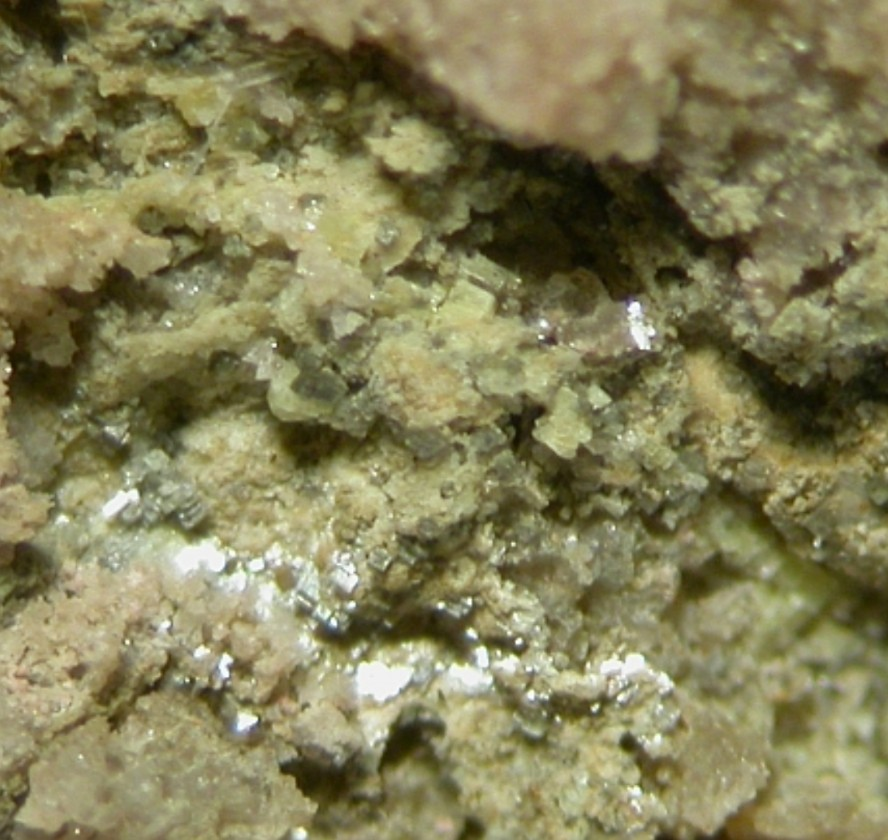
- Metarauchite

General
- Category: Uranyl Arsenates
- Formula: Ni(UO_{2})_{2}(AsO_{4})_{2}·8H_{2}O
- IMA symbol: Mrau
- Strunz classification: 08.EB.05
- Dana classification: 40.02a.17.02
- Crystal system: Triclinic
- Crystal class: Pinacoidal; H-M symbol: 1̅
- Space group: P1̅
- Unit cell: a = 7.194(4) b = 9.713(5) c = 13.201(9) α = 75.79(5)° β = 83.92(3)° γ = 81.59(4)°

Identification
- Color: Yellow to light greenish yellow
- Crystal habit: Tabular crystals
- Twinning: Multiply twinned along {011}
- Cleavage: Perfect on (011)
- Fracture: Uneven
- Tenacity: Very brittle
- Mohs scale hardness: 2
- Luster: Vitreous – pearly
- Streak: Light green to pale yellow
- Diaphaneity: Transparent to translucent
- Density: 3.81 gm/cc
- Optical properties: Biaxial (−)
- Birefringence: δ = 0.024
- Pleochroism: Non-pleochroic
- 2V angle: Measured: 23–52°
- Ultraviolet fluorescence: None
- Solubility: Cold 10% HCl

Metarauchite is a member of the autunite group, found at the Jáchymov ore district (type locality), Czech Republic and in Schneeberg, Germany. The autunite group is a group of structured uranyl phosphates and arsenates; the other members of the group are autunite, bassetite, heinrichite, kahlerite, nováčekite-I, nováčekite-II, rauchite, sabugalite, saléeite, torbernite, uranocircite, uranospinite, and zeunerite. The mineral is named after Czech mineral collector Luděk Rauch, who died in the Jáchymov mines during mineral prospecting.

== Occurrence ==
Metarauchite occurs as a secondary mineral in strongly oxidized polymetallic vein material. Metarauchite is found primarily in two localities, the northern part of the Jáchymov ore district, northwestern Bohemia, Czech Republic and the Heber mine, Neustädtel, Germany. It is commonly associated with metazeunerite, erythrite, and gypsum (Jáchymov) and Ni-bearing metanováčekite, metazeunerite, pharmacosiderite (Schneeberg). Both localities have a surface containing strongly altered aggregates of primary ore with relics of uraninite, arsenopyrite and nickelskutterudite and traces of native bismuth at the Schweitzer vein in the Eduard mine.

== Physical properties ==
Metarauchite exhibits yellow to light greenish-yellow crystals, up to 0.8 mm in size, these crystals are transparent to translucent and display vitreous to pearly luster. It exhibits a hardness of 2 on the Moh's Hardness Scale. Displays thick tabular crystals, with a prevalent pinacoid (011). Metarauchite is very brittle and shows perfect cleavage along the {011} plane. Metarauchite does not exhibit fluorescence either in short- and long-wavelength ultraviolet radiation. The density of metarauchite is not easily measured because of the relatively small size of most of its crystals; hence only the calculated density from the unit cell parameters and empirical formula was obtained, giving the value 3.81 g/cm^{3} .

== Optical properties ==
Metarachite is biaxial negative, it exhibits its 2V is calculated at 52°. Metarauchite is non-pleochroic and displays no observable dispersion and a Gladstone-Dale index of 0.03.

== Chemical properties ==
Metarauchite is a Ni- and As-dominant member of the group of hydrated uranyl arsenates and phosphates with the autunite-type sheet containing divalent cations in their inter-layer. It is only isostructural with synthetic metakirchheimerite. Metarauchite displays prominent substitution for Mg with Co, but magnesium is more commonly substituted with Ni in species found at the Schneeberg locality. The empirical formula for metarauchite is (Ni0_{0.82}Co_{0.12}Mg_{0.02})_{Σ0.96}(UO_{2})_{2.01}[(AsO_{4})_{1.88}(PO_{4})_{0.03}(SiO_{4})_{0.02}]_{Σ1.93}•8.21H_{2}O (on the basis of 20 O,OH atoms). Simplified, the formula is Ni(UO_{2})_{2}(AsO_{2})_{2}•8H_{2}O.

== Chemical composition (Jáchymov) ==
Oxide	wt%	Range
NiO	6.05	5.58–7.10
CoO	0.91	0.7–1.13
MgO	0.09	0.00–0.24
UO_{3}	56.72	55.65–60.97
As_{2}O_{5}	21.31	19.87–23.22
P_{2}O_{5}	0.22	17.14–17.69
SiO_{2}	0.09	3.43–5.18
H_{2}O	14.61	1.37–1.43
Total	100%	-

== Chemical composition (Schneeberg) ==
Oxide	wt%	Range
NiO	5.48	4.81–6.86
CoO	0.81	0.57–1.09
ZnO	0.14	0.00–0.42
MgO	0.50	0.17–0.88
UO_{3}	58.42	59.64–64.49
As_{2}O_{5}	18.34	14.03–23.61
P_{2}O_{5}	0.22	0.64–3.83
SiO_{2}	0.09	0.00–0.42
H_{2}O	14.19	-
Total	100%	

== Crystallography ==
Metarauchite is in the triclinic crystal system, with a space group of P1 and is classed as a pinacoidal. The cell parameters are a = 7.194(2) Å, b = 9.759(5) Å, c = 13.231(7) Å, α = 75.53(3)°, β = 84.01(3)°, γ = 81.59(3)°, which shows an a:b:c ratio of 0.737:1:1.356. The unit cell volume is 887.53 Å^{3} (Calculated from Unit Cell). Metarauchite crystals show characteristic multiply twinned along {011}.

== Powder X-ray diffraction ==
d-spacing intensity
8.625	(100)
5.078	(25)
5.044	(29)
4.277	(29)
3.568	(50)
3.492	(28)
3.424	(26)
2.990	(21)

== See also ==
List of minerals
