= Gustav Zeuner =

German physicist and engineer (1828–1907)

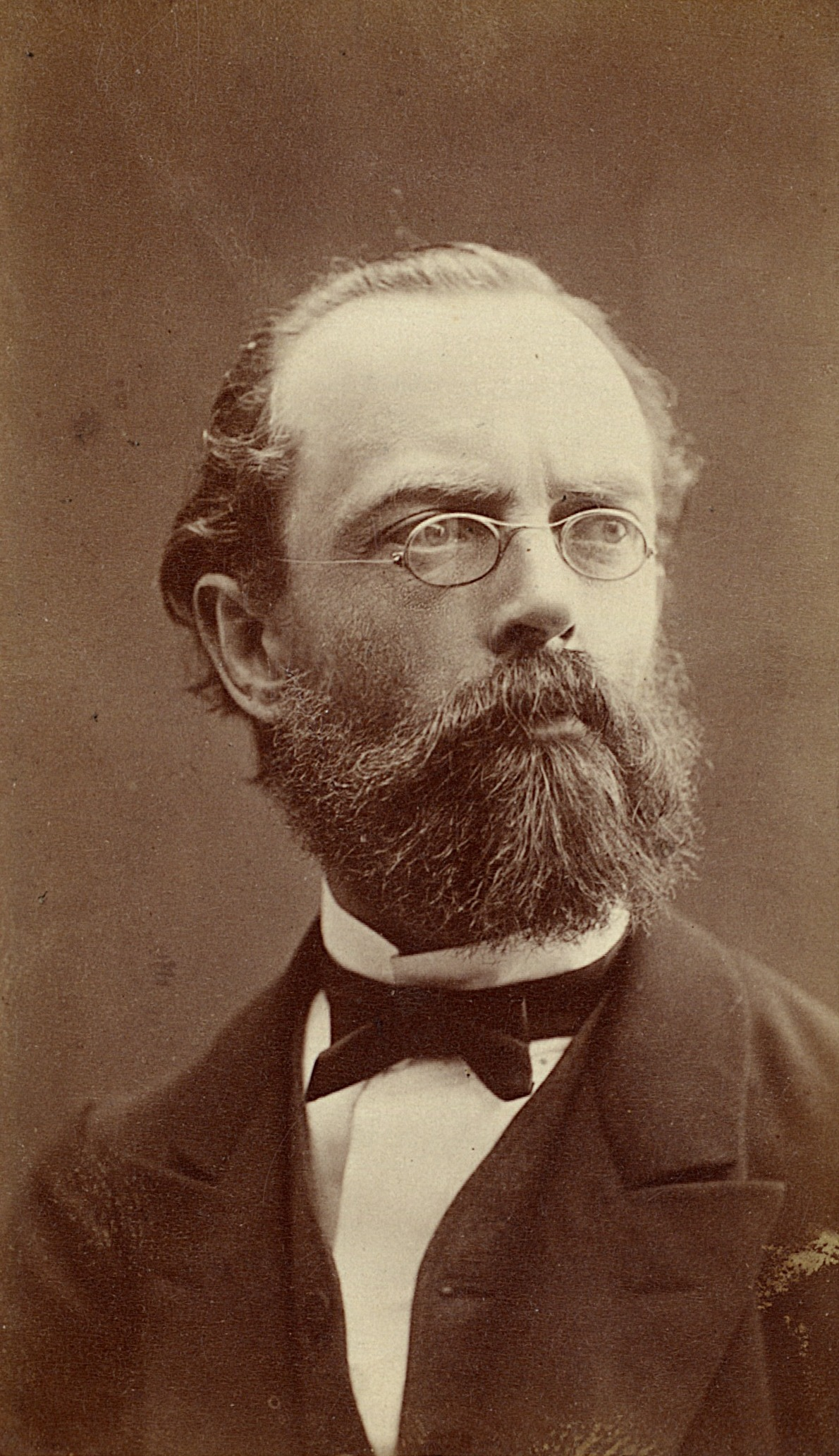
- Zeuner, 1875–1885
- Born: Gustav Anton Zeuner; 30 November 1828; Chemnitz, Kingdom of Saxony
- Died: 17 October 1907 (aged 78); Dresden, Kingdom of Saxony, German Empire
- Education: Bergakademie Freiberg
- Scientific career
- Workplaces: Federal Polytechnic School (1855–97)
- Academic advisors: Julius Weisbach
- Doctoral students: Wilhelm Röntgen (1869)

Gustav Anton Zeuner (German: [ˈɡʊstaːf ˈʔantoːn ˈtsɔʏnɐ]; 30 November 1828 – 17 October 1907) was a German physicist, engineer, and epistemologist, considered the founder of technical thermodynamics and of the Dresden School of Thermodynamics.

== Education ==
Gustav Anton Zeuner was born on 30 November 1828 in Chemnitz, Saxony. His first training in the subject of engineering was at the Königliche Gewerbeschule in Chimnitz (now the Chemnitz University of Technology), where he studied from 1843 to 1848.

In 1848, Zeuner moved the short distance to the Bergakademie (Mining Academy) in Freiberg, today also a university of technology, where he studied mining and metallurgy. He developed close links with one of his professors, the famous mineralogist Julius Weisbach, with whom he worked on several projects.

The university course was disrupted, however, during the revolutions which took place all over Germany. Large popular assemblies and mass demonstrations took place, primarily demanding freedom of the press, freedom of assembly, arming of the people, and a national German parliament. He joined the revolutionaries on the barricades in Dresden during the May Uprising in 1849. Unlike many of his compatriots, some of whom were sentenced to death or sent to the workhouse; Zeuner was pardoned. He was able to complete his course, and even completed his PhD at the University of Leipzig in 1853, but was banned from ever teaching at any Saxon university.

== Career ==
In 1853, Zeuner took over as the editor of the engineering magazine Der Civilenginieur. Zeitschrift für das Ingenieurwesen, the first German magazine specializing in mechanics, which ran until 1896. He continued in this position until 1857, even after moving to Zurich in 1855 to work as a professor for technical mechanics at the newly established Federal Polytechnic School (now the ETH Zurich). There, he worked alongside famous engineers such as Franz Reuleaux. Other Dresden revolutionaries had fled their home country for Zurich (Richard Wagner, Gottfried Semper, Theodor Mommsen).

It was in Zurich that Zeuner made his model of a locomotive front end in 1858; he recognized its potential for creating momentum but was only interested in the theory and did not develop the design any further. In 1869, he invented the three-dimensional population graph now sometimes known as a Zeuner diagram, but more often as a Lexis diagram, named after Wilhelm Lexis who modified the idea slightly.

From 1859, Zeuner worked the stand-in director of the polytechnic, and in May 1865, he took over the position officially. His former professor, Julius Weisbach, commemorated his friend's acquisition of the post by naming a mineral after him - the transparent green crystal zeunerite.

=== Return to Germany ===
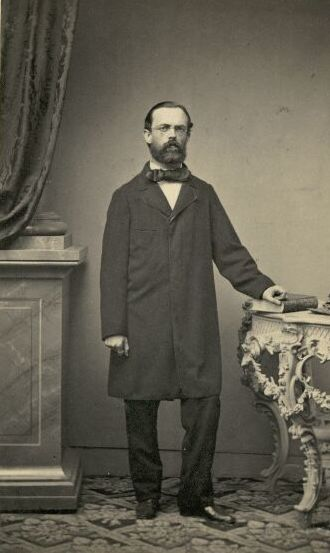
Zeuner, c. 1886

In 1871, Zeuner returned to Germany and was once again able to work with Weisbach when he succeeded his old friend as director of the Freiberg Mining Academy. He also taught there until 1875 as a professor of mechanics and the study of mining machinery. This was now possible, despite the teaching ban which had been placed on him, because of the amnesty granted to all the revolutionaries in 1862.

In 1873, while still director of Freiberg Mining Academy, Zeuner also took on the post of director at the Royal Saxon Polytechnicum in Dresden (now Technische Universität Dresden). His efforts there led to the introduction of the humanities; the extension of the range of subjects taught resulted in the polytechnic's rise to a full-scale polytechnic university in 1890.

In 1889, Zeuner gave up his position as director of the polytechnic to work as a lecturer until his retirement in 1897.

Zeuner died on 17 October 1907 in Dresden at the age of 78.

== Gustav Zeuner Award ==
Since 1993, the German Association of Engineers (Verein Deutscher Ingenieure or VDI) has presented students with the Gustav Zeuner Award for the best engineering thesis in Germany; Zeuner supported the Dresden branch of the VDI at its foundation in 1897.

== Publications ==
- Die Schiebersteuerungen mit besonderer Berücksichtigung der Lokomotivsteuerungen (Slide-valve controls with particular emphasis on locomotive controls) Freiberg 1858
- Grundzüge der mechanischen Wärmetheorie (Basics of mechanical heat theory) 1860
- Technische Thermodynamik (Technical Thermodynamics) 1887; translated in English in 1907 as Technical Thermodynamics

== See also ==
- Piston valve (steam engine)
- Zeuner water turbine
