= Metatorbernite =

Uranyl phosphate mineral

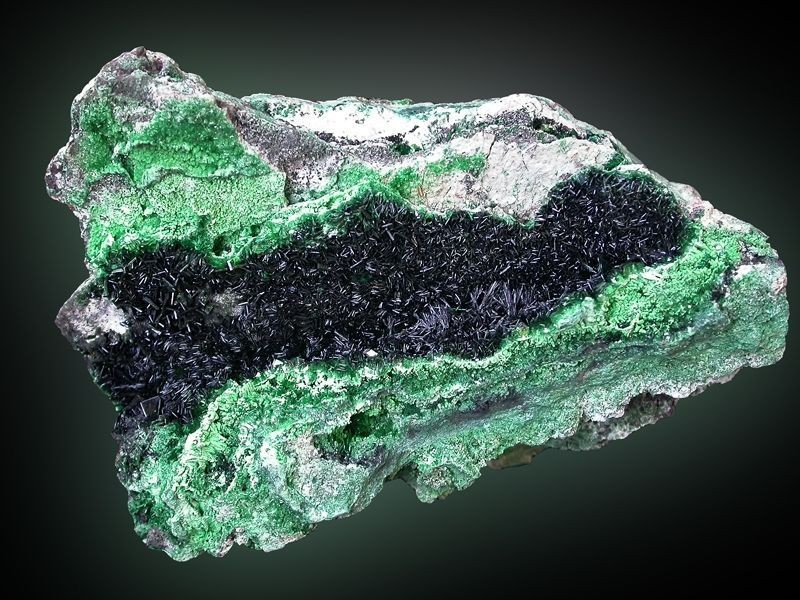
- The lighter green crystals are Metatorbernite

General
- Category: Phosphate minerals
- Formula: Cu(UO_{2})_{2}(PO_{4})_{2}·8(H_{2}O)
- IMA symbol: Mtor
- Strunz classification: 8.EB.10
- Crystal system: Tetragonal
- Crystal class: Dipyramidal (4/m) (same H-M symbol)
- Space group: P4/n

Identification
- Colour: Light to dark green
- Crystal habit: Flat plates
- Cleavage: Perfect
- Fracture: Brittle
- Mohs scale hardness: 2.5
- Lustre: Vitreous, adamantine
- Streak: Light green
- Specific gravity: 3.7–3.8
- Refractive index: 1.624–1.626
- Other characteristics: Radioactive

Metatorbernite (or meta-torbernite) is a radioactive phosphate mineral, and is a dehydration pseudomorph of torbernite. Chemically, it is a copper uranyl phosphate and usually occurs in the form of green platy deposits. It can form by direct deposition from a supersaturated solution, which produces true crystalline metatorbernite, with a dark green colour, translucent diaphaneity, and vitreous lustre. However, more commonly, it is formed by the dehydration of torbernite, which causes internal stress and breakage within the crystal lattice, resulting in crystals composed of microscopic powder held together using electrostatic force, and having a lighter green colour, opaque diaphaneity, and a relatively dull lustre. As with torbernite, it is named after the Swedish chemist Torbern Bergman. It is especially closely associated with torbernite, but is also found amongside autunite, meta-autunite and uraninite.

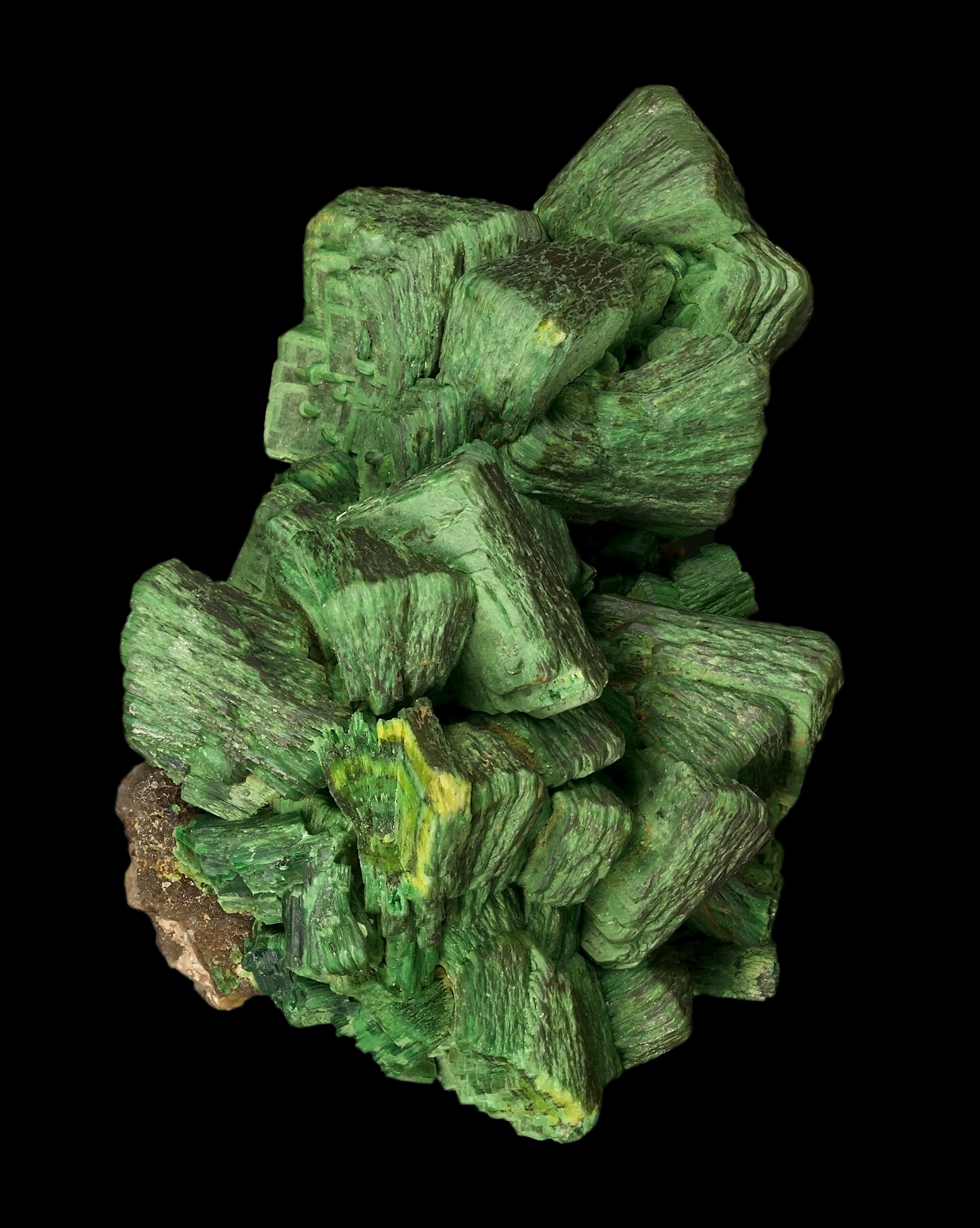
Metatorbernite from the Margabal Mine, Entraygues-sur-Truyère, France. Size: 4 x 3 x 1.8 cm.
