= Torbernite =

Copper uranyl phosphate mineral

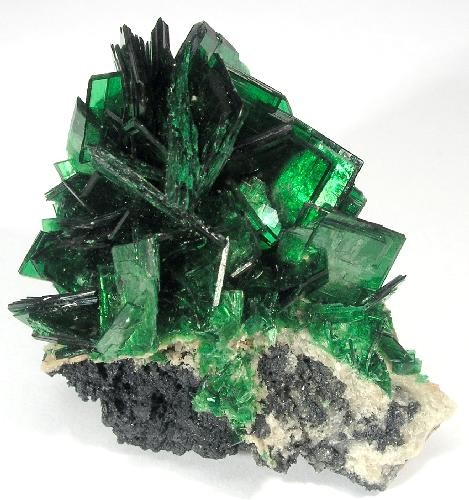
- Torbernite crystals from Mashamba West Mine, Kolwezi, Katanga Province, Democratic Republic of the Congo

General
- Category: Phosphate minerals
- Formula: Cu[(UO_{2})(PO_{4})]_{2}(H_{2}O)_{12}
- IMA symbol: Tor
- Strunz classification: 8.EB.05
- Crystal system: Tetragonal
- Crystal class: Ditetragonal dipyramidal (4/mmm); H-M symbol: (4/m 2/m 2/m)
- Space group: I4/mmm

Identification
- Formula mass: 641 – 713 g/mol, depending the degree of water loss
- Color: Emerald green to apple green
- Crystal habit: Tabular crystals; Foliated to earthy masses and encrustations
- Twinning: Rare on [110]
- Cleavage: [001] Perfect; [100] Distinct
- Fracture: Brittle
- Mohs scale hardness: 2–2.5
- Luster: Vitreous; pearly
- Streak: Pale green
- Diaphaneity: Transparent to subtranslucent
- Density: measured: 3.22; calculated: 3.264(1)
- Optical properties: Uniaxial (−)
- Refractive index: nω = 1.590 – 1.592 nε = 1.581 – 1.582
- Birefringence: δ = 0.009 – 0.010
- Pleochroism: Visible
- Melting point: Decomposes before
- Fusibility: Decomposes before
- Other characteristics: Radioactive and Poisonous

Torbernite, also known as chalcolite, is a relatively common mineral with the chemical formula Cu[(UO_{2})(PO_{4})]_{2}·12H_{2}O. It is a radioactive, hydrated green copper uranyl phosphate, found in granites and other uranium-bearing deposits as a secondary mineral. The chemical formula of torbernite is similar to that of autunite in which a Cu^{2+} cation replaces a Ca^{2+} cation. Torbernite tends to dehydrate to metatorbernite with the sum formula Cu[(UO_{2})(PO_{4})]_{2}·8H_{2}O.

== Etymology and history ==
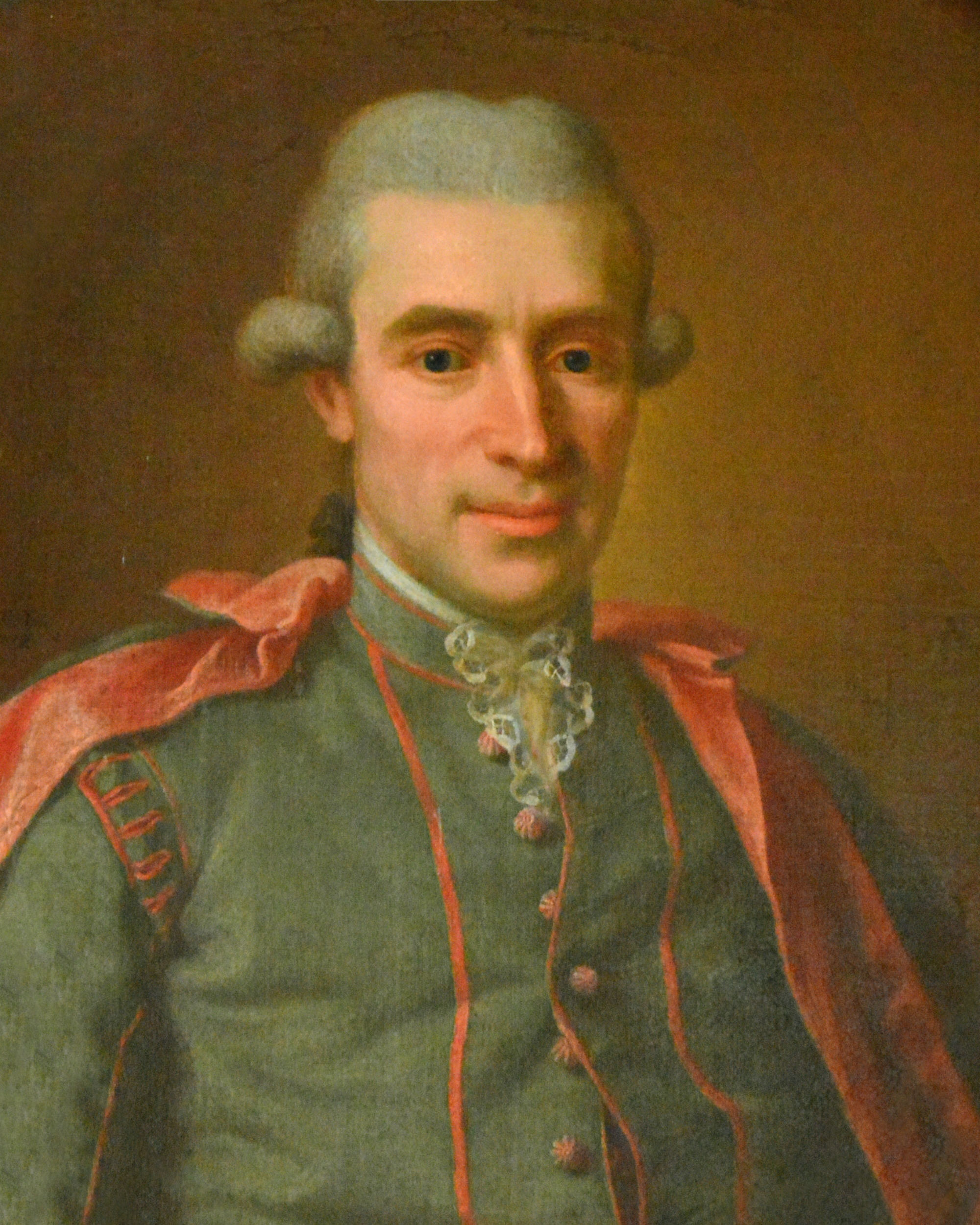
Torbern Olof Bergman

Torbernite was found for the first time at Georg Wagsfort Mine near Johanngeorgenstadt in the Ore Mountains in Saxony. It was first mentioned in 1772 by Ignaz von Born in his work Lythophylacium Bornianum, calling it "mica viridis crystallina, ibid." (green crystalline mica from Johanngeorgenstadt, Sax.; ibid. = "as the item above"). In 1780 Abraham Gottlob Werner uses Born's work and describes the mineral in more detail, calling it at first "grüner Glimmer" (green mica), later naming it "torbernite" in honour of the Swedish mineralogist and chemist Torbern Olof Bergman (1735–1784).

== Classification ==
According to the International Mineralogical Association (IMA), which last updated its list in 2009, the Nickel-Strunz system lists torbernite in the section of "uranyl phosphates and arsenates". There it is part of the sub-section "UO_{2} : RO_{4} = 1 : 1", forming the autunite group along with autunite, heinrichite, kahlerite, kirchheimerite, metarauchite, nováčekite-I, nováčekite-II, saléeite, uranocircite I, uranocircite II, uranospinite, xiangjiangite and zeunerite with system number 8.EB.05.

Dana groups the mineral into the class "phosphates, arsenates and vanadates", into the section "hydrated phosphates etc." into an unnamed group with metatorbernite, number 40.02a.13.

== Crystal structure ==
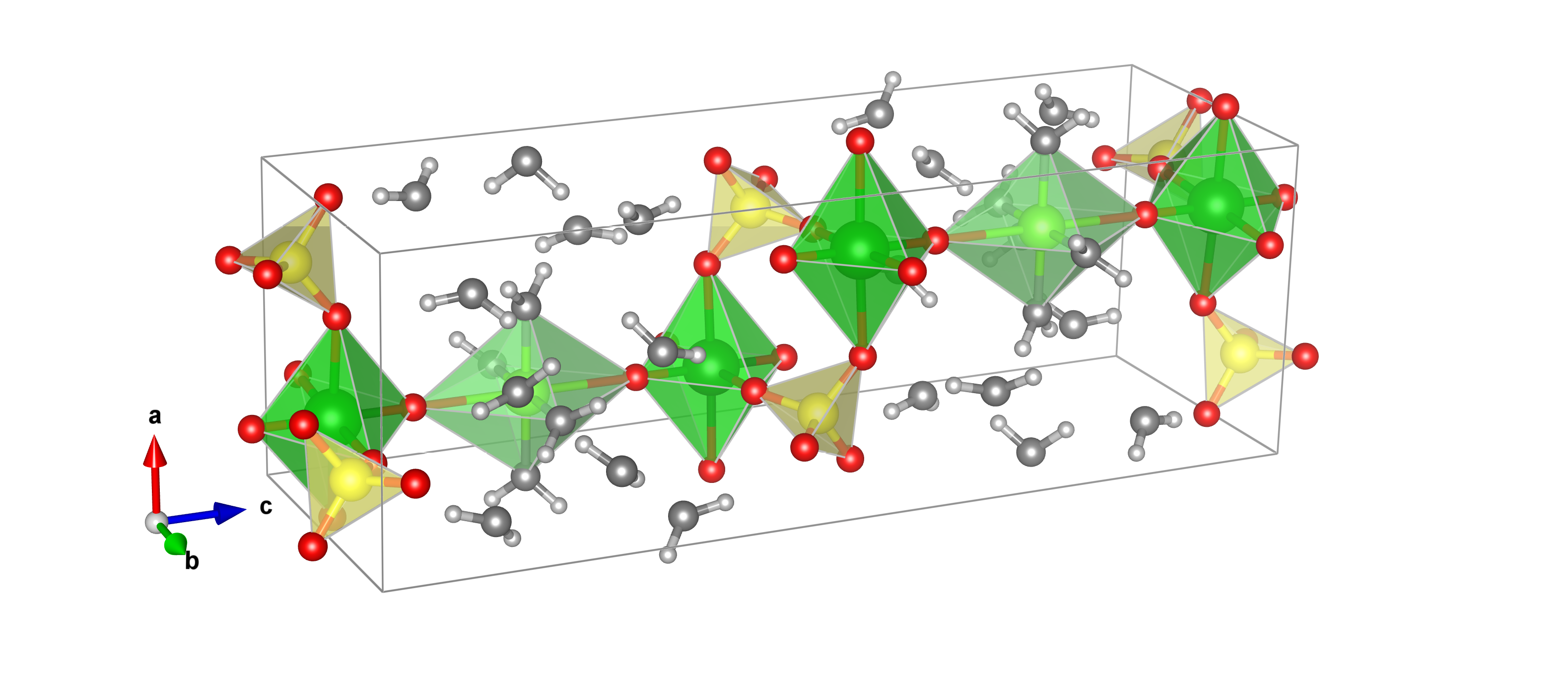
Packing of torbernite. Colour code: uranium, copper, phosphorus, oxygen, water, hydrogen

Torbernite crystallises in the tetragonal space group I4/mmm with the lattice parameters a = 7.0267(4) Å und c = 20.807(2) Å and 2 formula units per unit cell.

In a study in 2003, using fresh, synthetic crystals, Locock and Burns have compared the crystal structures of the copper uranyl phosphates torbernite, Cu[(UO_{2})(PO_{4})]_{2}(H_{2}O)_{12} and metatorbernite, Cu[(UO_{2})(PO_{4})]_{2}(H_{2}O)_{8} with those of the copper uranyl arsenates zeunerite, Cu[(UO_{2})(AsO_{4})]_{2}(H_{2}O)_{12}, and metazeunerite, Cu[(UO_{2})(AsO_{4})]_{2}(H_{2}O)_{8}. In these studies they were able to finally analyse the crystal structure of torbernite for the very first time, and to get a significantly more precise analysis for the structure of metatorbernite, compared with previous studies (Makarov and Tobelko R1 = 25%, Ross et al. R1 = 9.7%, Stergiou et al. R1 = 5.6%, Calos and Kennard R1 = 9.2% vs. Locock und Burns R1 = 2.3%).

The study shows that torbernite is isostructural to zeunerite, and metatorbernite is isostructural to metazeunerite. All four compounds are of the layered autunite type with the [(UO_{2})(XO_{4})]^{−} structural motif (with X = P or As). The Cu^{2+} ions are coordinated in a square-planar fashion by water molecules in all these compounds, and further coordinate to the uranyl oxygen atoms, forming octahedra with Jahn-Teller distortion. The additional water molecules are held in the crystal structure only by hydrogen bridges.

== Metatorbernite ==
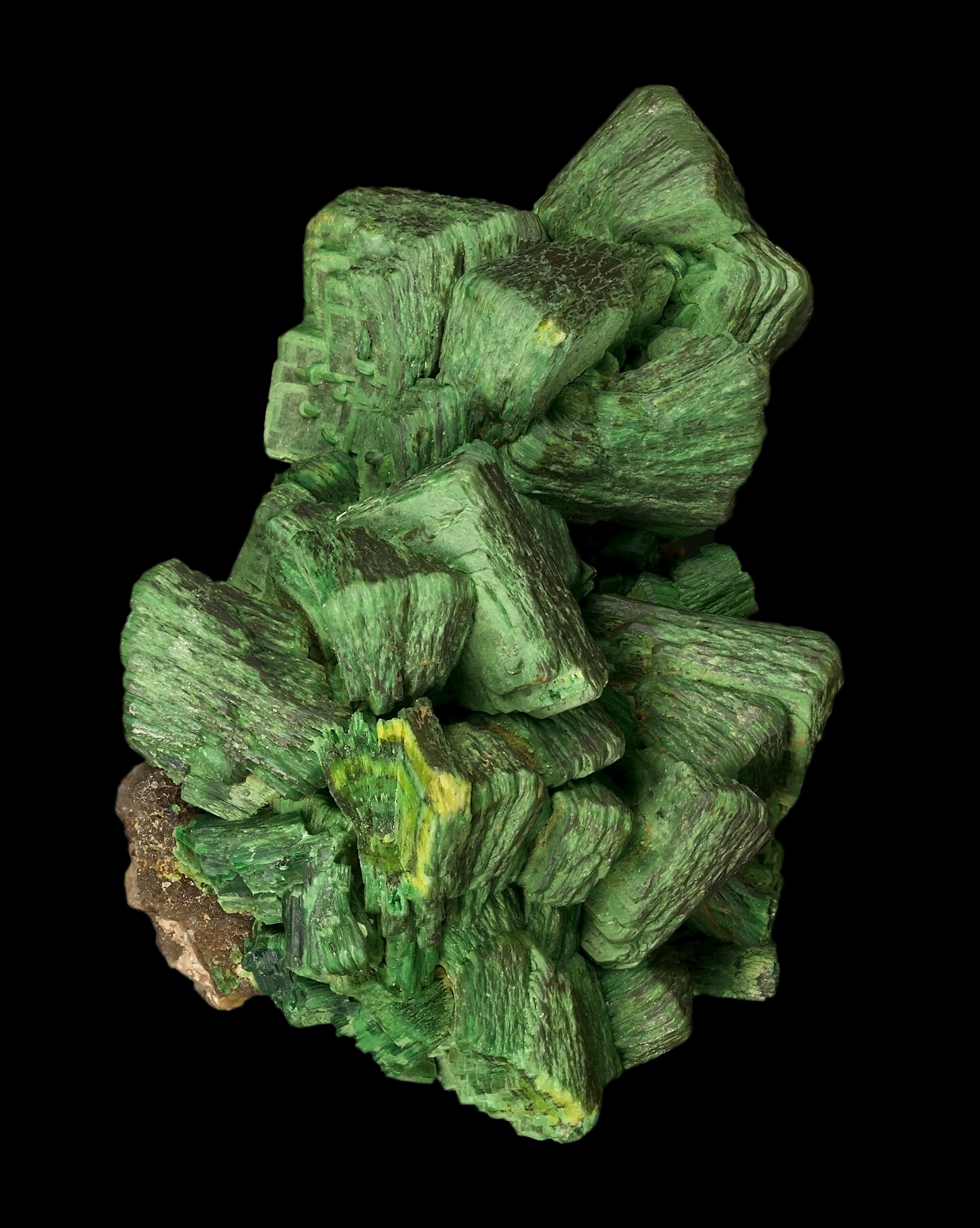
Metatorbernite from Margabal Mine, Entraygues-sur-Truyère, France (Size: 4 cm × 3 cm × 1.8 cm)

Torbernite dehydrates readily to metatorbernite with the sum formula Cu[(UO_{2})(PO_{4})]_{2}(H_{2}O)_{8}. It forms as torbernite withers, and can also be obtained by artificially heating torbernite above 75 °C. The crystals are rather opaque and only weakly translucent with a glassy lustre.

Metatorbernite crystallises tetragonally-dipyramidally in space group P4/n with the lattice parameters a = 6.9756(5) Å and c = 17.349(2) Å and 2 formula units per unit cell.

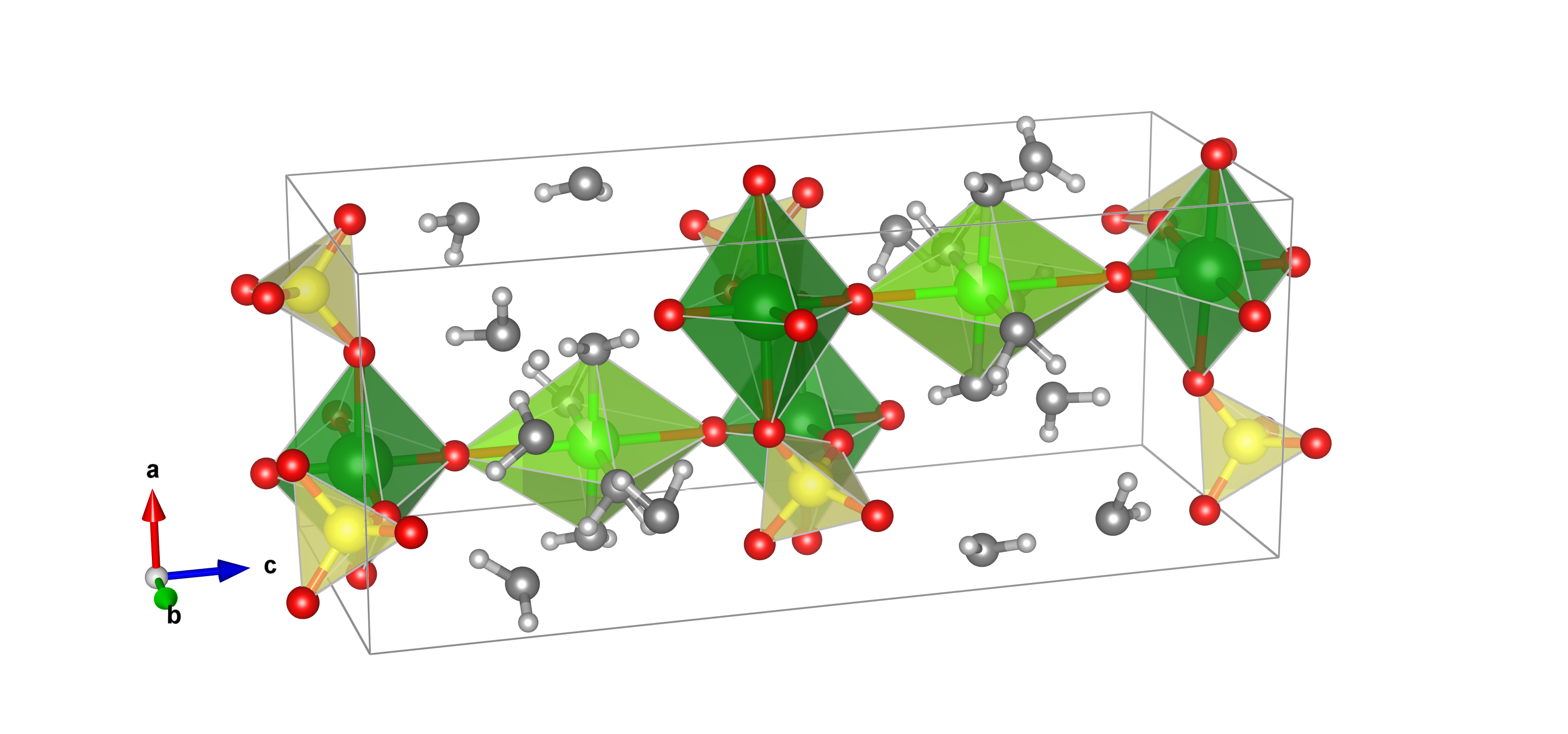
Packing of metatorbernite. Colour code: uranium, copper, phosphorus, oxygen, water, hydrogen

The crystal structure of metatorbernite is different from torbernite as every second uranyl phosphate layer is moved about one half of the length of the crystallographic a-axis in the directions [100] and [010]. The analysis by Locock and Burns confirms the finding by Stergiou et al., that the Cu^{2+} ions only have an 88% crystallographic occupancy. The authors assume that by protonation of some of the water molecules there is a charge compensation for electronic neutrality, as it is discussed with the mineral chernikovite. The same is postulated by the same authors for autunite. Due to the limitations of X-ray diffraction this postulate is practically not verifiable with this method.

The analysis by Locock and Burns shows eight molecules of water per formula unit in metatorbernite. This is in accord with the works by Arthur Francis Hallimons and Kurt Walenta, who show that the different steps of hydration between torbernite and metatorbernite have clear boundaries, and the water content of each compound remains constant and does not vary, in contrast for instance, as seen in minerals of the zeolite group. Therefore, sum formulae indicating varying degrees of water for torbernite and metatorbernite must not be used.

== Properties ==
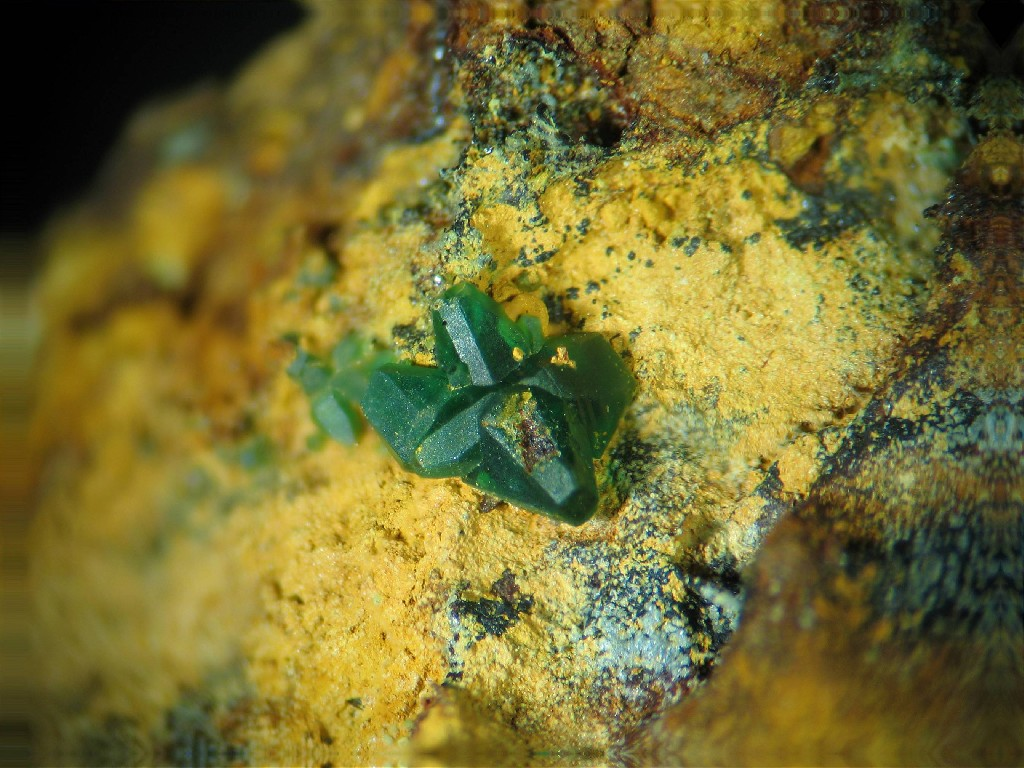
A pyramidal torbernite crystal from Brest, France (Field of view: 7 mm × 5 mm)

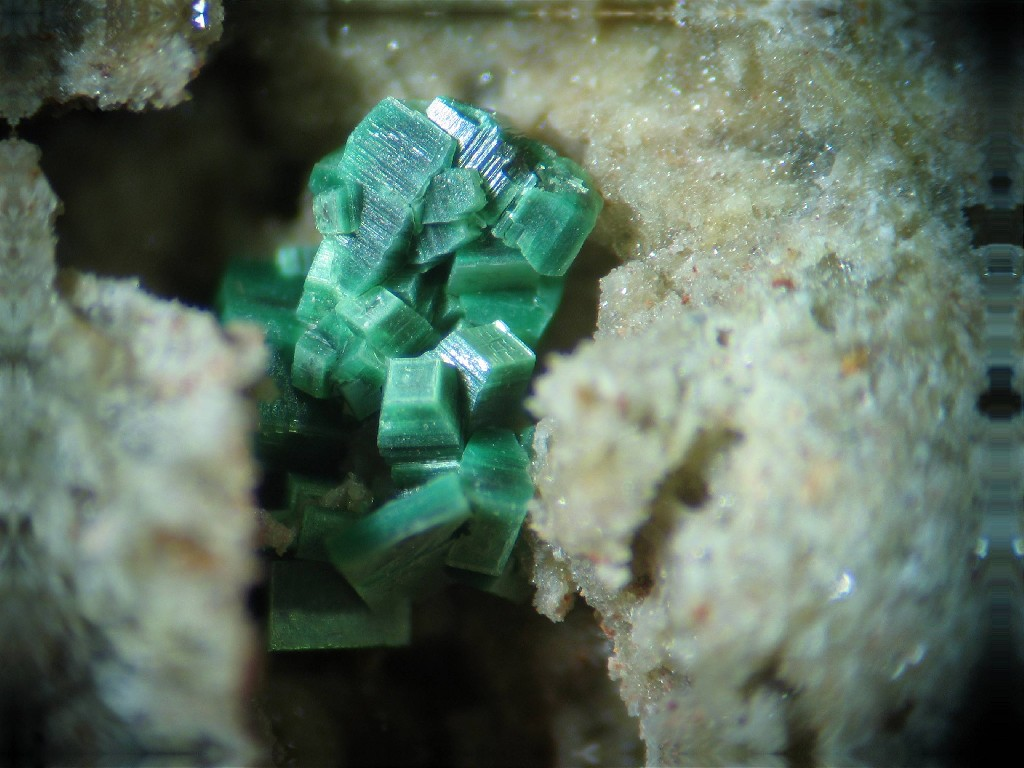
Intergrowth of dipyramidal crystals of metatorbernite in a geode from Les Montmins Mine (Ste Barbe Ader), Échassières, Kanton Ébreuil, Département Allier, Auvergne, France (Field of view: 1 mm × 1 mm)

=== Morphology ===
The mineral is often encountered as small thin tabular crystals, but may also be flaky or powdery. More rare are thicker plates, resembling a stacked deck of cards. More frequent than these are dipyramidal forms.

=== Physical and chemical properties ===
Because of its uranium content of about 48% the material is strongly radioactive. According to the sum formula a specific activity of 85.9 kBq/g can be given (for comparison: natural potassium: 0.0312 kBq/g).

Contrary to its calcium analogue autunite the mineral does not fluoresce. The mineral is very brittle. Its hardness (Mohs) is between 2 and 2.5.

== Occurrence and localities ==
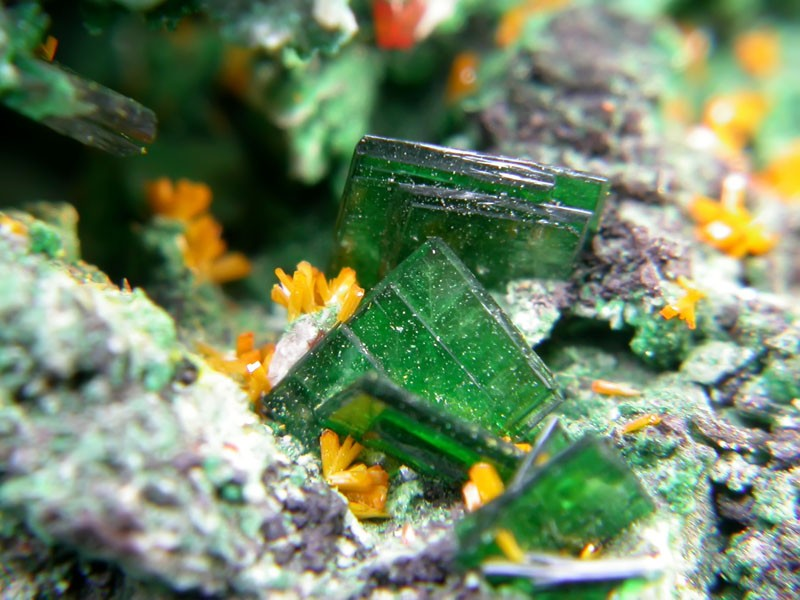
Paragenesis of kasolite (yellow, acicular) with torbernite (green, platy)

Torbernite forms as a secondary mineral on the oxidation zone of uranium ores. It is often found in paragenesis with autunite, metatorbernite, uraninite, zeunerite and, very rarely, with gauthierite.

Torbernite is relatively common, and world-wide there are more than 1100 documented localities known by 2022. In Germany it is known not only from its type locality Johanngeorgenstadt, but also from other areas in the Ore Mountains, as well as from the Black Forest, Fichtel Mountains, Bavarian Forest, Thuringian Forest. Further localities are in Argentina, Australia, Austria, Belgium, Bolivia, Brazil, Canada, Chile, China, Czech Republic, Democratic Republic of the Congo, France, Gabon, Ireland, Italy, Japan, Madagascar, Mexico, Namibia, Norway, Poland, Portugal, Romania, Slovakia, Slovenia, Spain, South Africa, Switzerland, Tajikistan, Uzbekistan, the United Kingdom and the United States.

== Precautions ==
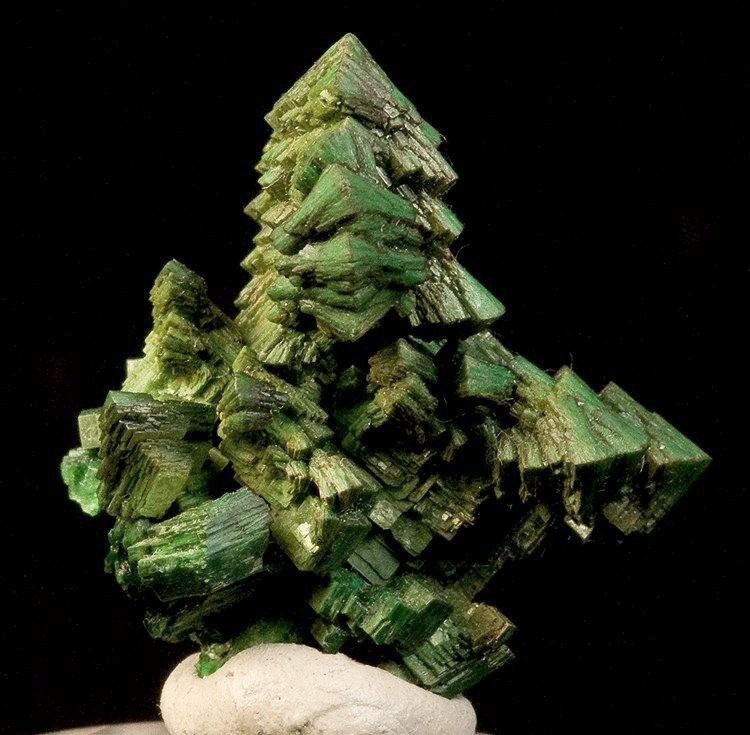
A torbernite specimen from the Margabal Mine in the Midi-Pyrénées, France

Because of the inherent toxicity of uranium compounds, samples of this mineral should be kept in air tight glass jars.

== See also ==
- List of minerals
- List of minerals named after people
