= Metazeunerite =

Arsenate mineral

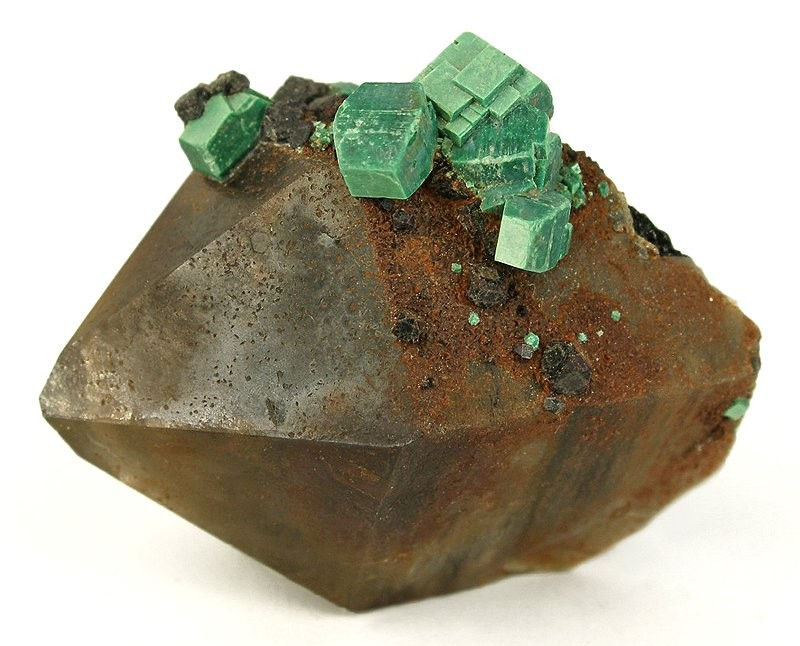
- Metazeunerite crystals to 7 mm on smoky quartz, Erongo Region, Namibia

General
- Category: Phosphate minerals
- Formula: Cu(UO_{2})_{2}(AsO_{4})_{2}·8H_{2}O
- IMA symbol: Mzeu
- Strunz classification: 8.EB.10
- Crystal system: Tetragonal
- Crystal class: Dipyramidal (4/m) (same H-M symbol)
- Space group: P4/n
- Unit cell: a = 7.1094 Å, c = 17.416 Å; Z = 2

Identification
- Color: Varies from pale to green
- Crystal habit: Tabular rectangular crystals with two pinacoid faces; foliated or micaceous aggregates
- Twinning: Merohedrally twinned
- Cleavage: Perfect on {001}; distinct on {010}
- Fracture: Uneven
- Tenacity: Brittle
- Mohs scale hardness: 2–2.5
- Luster: Vitreous to dull
- Streak: Pale green
- Diaphaneity: Transparent to translucent
- Specific gravity: 3.87
- Optical properties: Uniaxial (−)
- Refractive index: n_{w} = 1.643–1.651 n_{ε} = 1.623–1.635
- Birefringence: .020
- Pleochroism: Weak
- Solubility: Soluble in acids
- Other characteristics: Radioactive, Relief: moderate

Metazeunerite is an arsenate mineral with a chemical formula of Cu(UO_{2})_{2}(AsO_{4})_{2}·8H_{2}O. The origin of this mineral is almost always from the natural dehydration process of zeunerite.

It is named for civil engineer Gustav A. Zeuner, who worked at the School of Mines in Freiberg and its lowered hydration state.

== Properties ==
Its crystal system is tetragonal and its crystal class is 4/m, which is also called the tetragonal-dipyramidal class because it only has a vertical four-fold rotation axis that is perpendicular to the symmetry plane. When looking at a thin section, metzeunerite is anisotropic, meaning that it has pleochroism. When a mineral is anisotropic, one can see whether it is uniaxial or biaxial, depending on how fast the rays of light are moving through the mineral. This mineral is uniaxial negative due to the ordinary ray being slower than the extraordinary ray.

== Occurrence ==
Metazeunerite is an uncommon radioactive secondary mineral found in "arsenic bearing hydrothermal uranium deposits" across the world. This widespread mineral occurs specifically in Europe, western North America, Australia, Brazil and Chile, Namibia, and Kazakhstan. It is currently studied through thermal decomposition by calculating the different levels of dehydration, as zeunerite is transformed into metazeunerite. Metazeunerite was shown to be an important solubility limiting phase controlling uranium migration in the soils of the UK's only, and now abandoned, uranium mine, South Terras, located near St Stephen-in-Brannel.

== Bibliography ==
- Palache, P.; Berman H.; Frondel, C. (1960). "Dana's System of Mineralogy, Volume II: Halides, Nitrates, Borates, Carbonates, Sulfates, Phosphates, Arsenates, Tungstates, Molybdates, Etc. (Seventh Edition)" John Wiley and Sons, Inc., New York, pp. 993–994.
