= Lexis diagram =

Diagram used in demographics

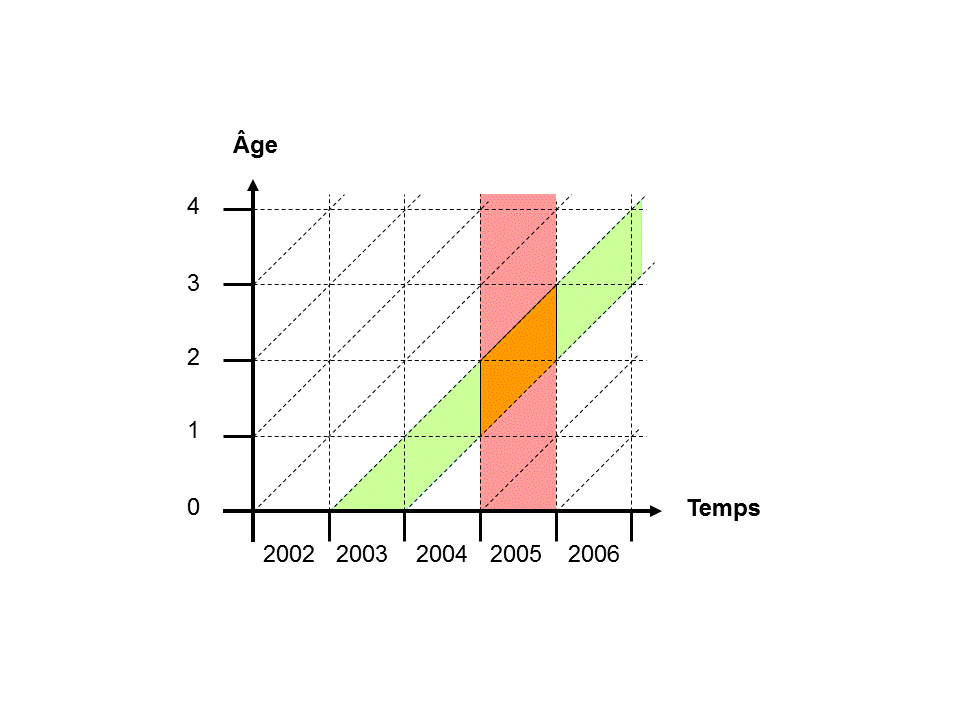
Lexis diagram showing the cohort of 2003-born persons in green, and the year 2005 in red.

In demography, a Lexis diagram (named after economist and social scientist Wilhelm Lexis) is a two-dimensional diagram that represents events (such as births or deaths) that occur to individuals belonging to different cohorts. Calendar time is usually represented on the horizontal axis, while age is represented on the vertical axis. In some cases, the y-axis is plotted backwards, with age 0 at the top of the page and increasing downwards. Other arrangements of the axes are also seen, and some go back to Lexis himself. As an example the death of an individual in 2009 at age 80 is represented by the point (2009,80); the cohort of all persons born in 1929 is represented by a diagonal line starting at (1929,0) and continuing through (1930,1), (1931, 2), and so on.
