= Zeunerite =

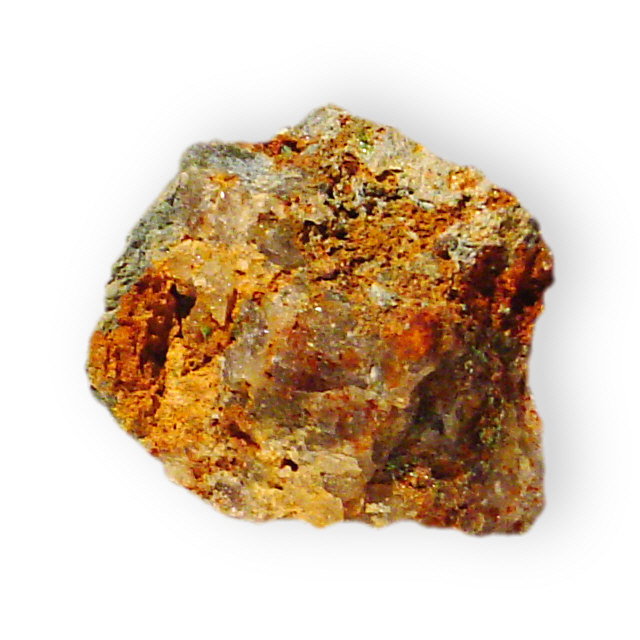

General
- Category: Arsenate mineral
- Formula: Cu(UO_{2})_{2}(AsO_{4})_{2}·(10-16)H_{2}O
- IMA symbol: Zeu
- Strunz classification: 8.EB.05
- Dana classification: 40.02a.14.01
- Crystal system: Tetragonal
- Crystal class: Ditetragonal dipyramidal (4/mmm); H-M symbol: (4/m 2/m 2/m)
- Space group: P4/nnc

Identification
- Color: Yellow-green, emerald-green
- Crystal habit: Crystals flat tabular on {001}, commonly subparallel to micaceous
- Cleavage: {001} perfect, {100}, distinct
- Mohs scale hardness: 2.5
- Luster: Vitreous
- Streak: pale green
- Diaphaneity: Transparent, becoming translucent on dehydration
- Specific gravity: 3.2–3.4
- Optical properties: Uniaxial (−)
- Refractive index: nω = 1.610 – 1.613 nε = 1.582 – 1.585
- Birefringence: δ = 0.028
- Pleochroism: Visible
- Other characteristics: Radioactive

Zeunerite is a green copper uranium arsenate mineral with formula Cu(UO_{2})_{2}(AsO_{4})_{2}·(10-16)H_{2}O. It is a member of the autunite group. The associated mineral metazeunerite is a dehydration product of zeunerite.

Zeunerite occurs as a secondary mineral in the oxidized weathering zone of hydrothermal uranium ore deposits which contain arsenic. Olivenite, mansfieldite, scorodite, azurite and malachite are found in association with zeunerite.

It was first described in 1872 for an occurrence in the Schneeberg District, Ore Mountains, Saxony, Germany. It was named for Gustav Anton Zeuner (1828–1907).
