= Wilhelm Lexis =

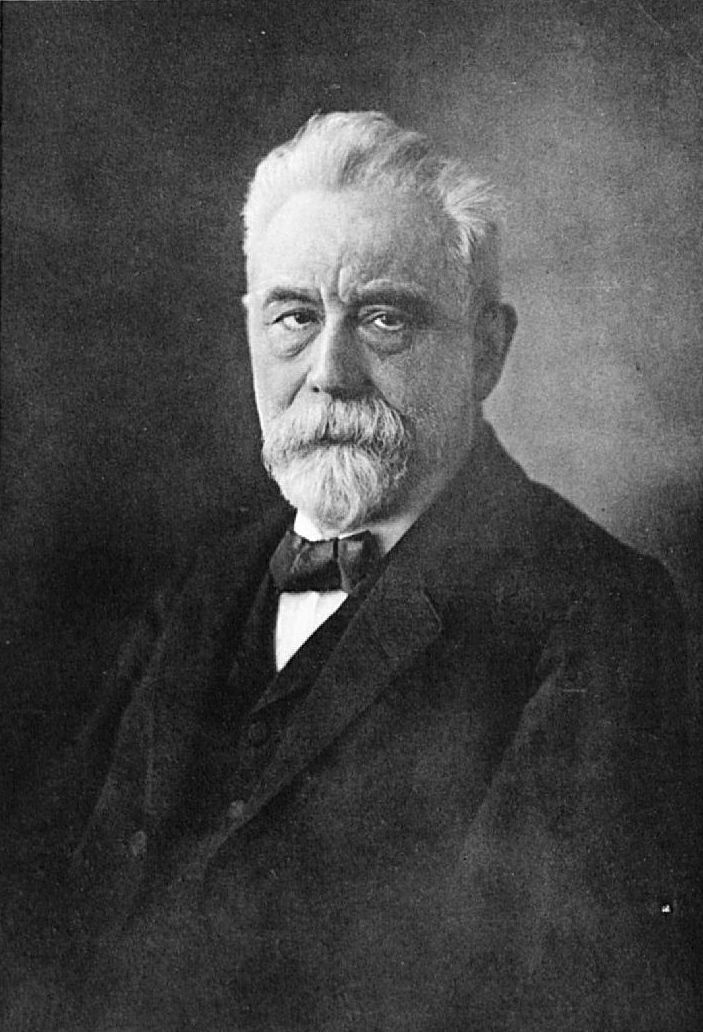
- Born: Wilhelm Hector Richard Albrecht Lexis; 17 July 1837; Eschweiler
- Died: 24 August 1914 (aged 77); Göttingen
- Citizenship: German
- Scientific career
- Fields: Social scientist
- Doctoral advisor: August Beer
- Doctoral students: Ladislaus Bortkiewicz

Wilhelm Lexis (17 July 1837, Eschweiler, Germany – 24 August 1914, Göttingen, Germany), full name Wilhelm Hector Richard Albrecht Lexis, was a German statistician, economist, and social scientist. The Oxford Dictionary of Statistics cites him as a "pioneer of the analysis of demographic time series". Lexis is largely remembered for two items that bear his name—the Lexis ratio and the Lexis diagram.

== Life ==
Lexis graduated in 1859 from the University of Bonn, where he studied science and mathematics. He spent some time afterwards in various occupations and, in 1861, went to Paris to study social science. It was there that Lexis became acquainted with the work of Adolphe Quetelet, whose quantitative approach to the social sciences was to guide much of Lexis' work. He spent about ten years in Paris, after which he took a teaching position in Strasbourg (France). At some point during this period, Lexis wrote his first book (Introduction to the Theory of Population Statistics) and had it published in 1875, by which time he was teaching at the Imperial University of Dorpat (today the University of Tartu) in what is today Tartu, Estonia.

Starting in 1876, Lexis was the chair of the Economics Department at the University of Freiburg. The various papers written by him during his eight-year tenure at Freiburg were, in the eyes of statistics historian Stephen Stigler, "his most important statistical work". Foremost among them was the 1879 paper "On the Theory of the Stability of Statistical Series", which introduced the quantity now often called the Lexis ratio.

Lexis moved on from Freiburg to the University of Breslau but stayed there only a few years (from 1884 to 1887). He then settled in Göttingen, taking a position at that city's University. In 1895, he established a course in actuarial science at the university, the first ever in Germany. In 1901, Lexis became a member of the Insurance Advisory Council for Germany's Federal Insurance Supervisory Office. He remained a member of the Council until his death in 1914. During this final period of his life, Lexis published two more books: Treatises on Population and Social Statistics (Jena: Gustav Fischer, 1903) and General Economics (Leipzig: Teubner, 1910). He was also the editor of a book on the German education system.

== Work ==
Throughout his professional career, Lexis published books and articles on a wide variety of topics, including demography, economics and mathematical statistics. However, little of that work proved to have lasting significance. Today, Lexis is largely remembered for two items that bear his name—the Lexis ratio and the Lexis diagram. His theory of mortality has also enjoyed a recent revival of interest.

=== Lexis ratio ===
To Lexis, a time series was "stable" if the underlying probability giving rise to the observed rates remained constant from year to year (or, more generally, from one measurement period to the next). Using modern terminology, such a time series would be called a zero-order moving-average series (also known as a white noise process). Lexis was aware that many series were not stable. For non-stable series, he imagined that the underlying probabilities varied over time, being affected by what he called "physical" forces (as opposed to the random "non-essential" forces that would cause an observed rate to be different than the underlying probability). In his 1879 paper "On the Theory of the Stability of Statistical Series", Lexis set himself the task of devising a method for distinguishing between stable and non-stable time series.

To this end, Lexis created a test statistic equal to the ratio between (i) the probable error of the observed rates and (ii) the probable error that would be expected if the underlying probabilities for each of the observed rates were all equal to the average rate observed across all of the observations. He called this ratio Q. Lexis then reasoned that if Q was sufficiently close to 1, then the time series was exhibiting what he called "normal dispersion" and one could assume that it was stable. If Q was substantially greater than 1, then the series was exhibiting "supernomal dispersion" and one must conclude that physical forces were having a discernible effect on the variability of the observations. Lexis used a Q value of 1.41 (i.e., the square root of 2) as the dividing line between "normal" and "supernormal" dispersion.

"Stability of Statistical Series" is the only one of Lexis' works cited in his entry in the Oxford Dictionary of Statistics. It is also the only one that receives an extended discussion in Stigler's A History of Statistics. And yet, Stigler ends his discussion by labeling the work a failure. To Stigler, its chief value was the discussion that it generated from other researchers in the field. It was those other researchers, and not Lexis, who created the modern science of time-series analysis.

=== Lexis diagram ===
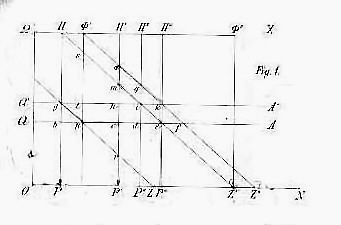
Original Lexis diagram (1875)

Although it can take various forms, the typical Lexis diagram is a graphical illustration of the lifetime of either an individual or a cohort of same-aged individuals. On the diagram, each such lifetime appears as a straight line in a two-dimensional plane, with one dimension representing time and the other representing age. The use of Lexis diagrams is very common amongst demographers, so much so that they often are used without being identified as Lexis diagrams.

Lexis introduced his diagram in his first book, Introduction to the Theory of Population Statistics (Strasbourg: Trubner, 1875). However, the notion of using a time vs. age diagram appears to have been developed more or less simultaneously by other authors. See the paper by Vandeschrick (2001) for more detail.

=== Theory of mortality ===
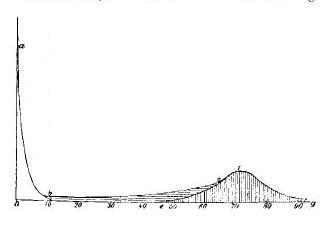
Lexis' mortality graph (1903)

In his 1877 book On the Theory of Mass Phenomena in Human Society (Freiburg: Wagnersche Buchhandlung), Lexis proposed that all human deaths could be classified into one of three types: (i) normal deaths, (ii) infant deaths and (iii) premature adult deaths. He also proposed that the normal deaths were subject to random forces such that, if all infant and other premature deaths were eliminated, the ages at which people died would exhibit a normal (i.e., Gaussian) distribution. Furthermore, the average of those ages would be equal to the age at which most adults are actually observed to die (i.e., the modal age at death), even though the actual observations are taking place in the presence of infant and other premature deaths.

In the adjacent diagram, the normal deaths are represented by the vertically-shaded bell-shaped area centered slightly above age 70; the infant deaths are represented by the unshaded area starting at age 0; the premature deaths are represented by the horizontally-shaded area bridging the infant and normal deaths.

Although Lexis' theory did generate some contemporaneous discussion, it never supplanted the traditional demographic measures of life expectancy and age-adjusted mortality rates. However, recent research suggests that the modal age at death might be a useful statistic for tracking changes in the lifespans of the elderly. For a survey of the contemporaneous response to Lexis' theory, see section IV ("Reception of Lexis' hypothesis in the late 19th century") of Véron and Rohrbasser (2003). For a discussion of the modern-day use of the modal age at death, see Horiuchi et al. (2013).
