= Autunite =

Type of phosphate mineral

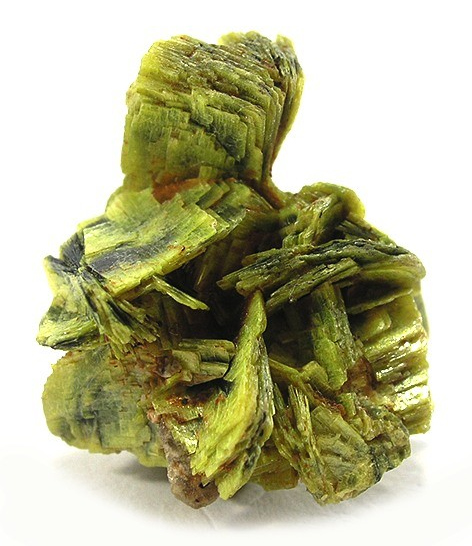
- Autunite from Daybreak Mine, Washington

General
- Category: Phosphate minerals
- Formula: Ca(UO_{2})_{2}(PO_{4})_{2}·10–12H_{2}O
- IMA symbol: Aut
- Strunz classification: 8.EB.05
- Crystal system: Orthorhombic
- Crystal class: Dipyramidal (mmm); H-M symbol: (2/m 2/m 2/m)
- Space group: Pnma
- Unit cell: a = 14.0135(6), b = 20.7121(8), c = 6.9959(3) [Å]; Z = 4

Identification
- Formula mass: 986.26 g/mol
- Color: Lemon-yellow to sulfur-yellow, greenish yellow to pale green; may be dark green to greenish black
- Crystal habit: Tabular crystals, foliated or scaly aggregates, and in crusts
- Twinning: Rare on {110}
- Cleavage: {001} perfect, {100} and {010} poor
- Fracture: uneven
- Mohs scale hardness: 2–2.5
- Luster: Vitreous – pearly
- Streak: Pale yellow
- Diaphaneity: Transparent to translucent
- Specific gravity: 3.1–3.2
- Density: 3.15
- Optical properties: Biaxial (−)
- Refractive index: n_{α} = 1.553 – 1.555 n_{β} = 1.575 n_{γ} = 1.577 – 1.578
- Birefringence: δ = 0.003
- Pleochroism: X = colorless to pale yellow; Y = Z = yellow to dark yellow
- 2V angle: Measured: 10° to 53°
- Ultraviolet fluorescence: Strong yellow-green fluorescence in UV; Radioactive
- Solubility: Soluble in acids
- Alters to: Dehydrates in air
- Other characteristics: Pseudotetragonal for synthetic material, Radioactive

Autunite (hydrated calcium uranyl phosphate), with formula Ca(UO_{2})_{2}(PO_{4})_{2}·10–12H_{2}O, is a yellow-greenish fluorescent phosphate mineral with a hardness of 2–2 1/2. Autunite crystallizes in the orthorhombic system and often occurs as tabular square crystals, commonly in small crusts or in fan-like masses. Due to the moderate uranium content of 48.27% it is radioactive and also used as uranium ore. Autunite fluoresces bright green to lime green under UV light. The mineral is also called calco-uranite, but this name is rarely used and effectively outdated.

Autunite was discovered in 1852 near Autun, France, which is also autunite's namesake. It occurs as an oxidation product of uranium minerals in granite pegmatites and hydrothermal deposits. Associate minerals include metaautunite, torbernite, phosphuranylite, saleeite, uranophane and sabugalite.

== Etymology ==
Autunite was named after the town of Autun, France, where the mineral was initially found. The mineral was named by Henry J. Brooke and William H. Miller in 1854. The archaic name "calco-uranite" pairs with the similarly composed mineral, torbernite, which was named "cupro-uranite". Both minerals are named due to their uranium content, with autunite's name referring to its calcium (calco), and torbernite's copper (cupro) quantity.

== Locations and mining ==
=== Mount Kit Carson, Washington ===
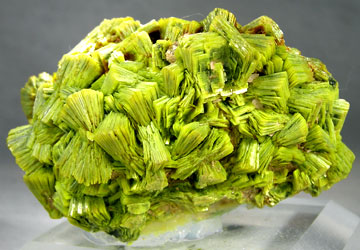
Autunite from Mount Kit Carson, Washington

Researchers found autunite inside the Daybreak Mine on Mount Kit Carson, Spokane, Washington (or sometimes referred to as "near Mount Spokane"), in "vugs, fractures, and shear zones in granitic rock". These areas showed signs of another phosphate, apatite, which may have helped lead to the formation of autunite, by providing a source of phosphate and lime. The formation may have occurred with the interaction of uranium leached from a separate deposit.

90,000 lbs of U_{3}O_{8} were produced from nine properties, although most of the ore came from the Daybreak Mine.

=== Other locations ===
One of the other locations of autunite includes Autun, France, the type locality and namesake of the mineral. The mineral was formed there as an alteration of uraninite and other uranium bearing minerals. Autunite is also found in Cornwall, Saxony, and North and South Dakota.

== Meta-autunite ==
If the mineral dries out, it can lose its water content and convert to meta-autunite-I, which can turn into meta-autunite-II after heating. These two subsequent minerals are very rare in nature. For scientific studies it is recommended to store the mineral in a sealed container to minimize the water loss. Museums are known to have covered the mineral with lacquer to avoid drying of the mineral.

== Gallery ==
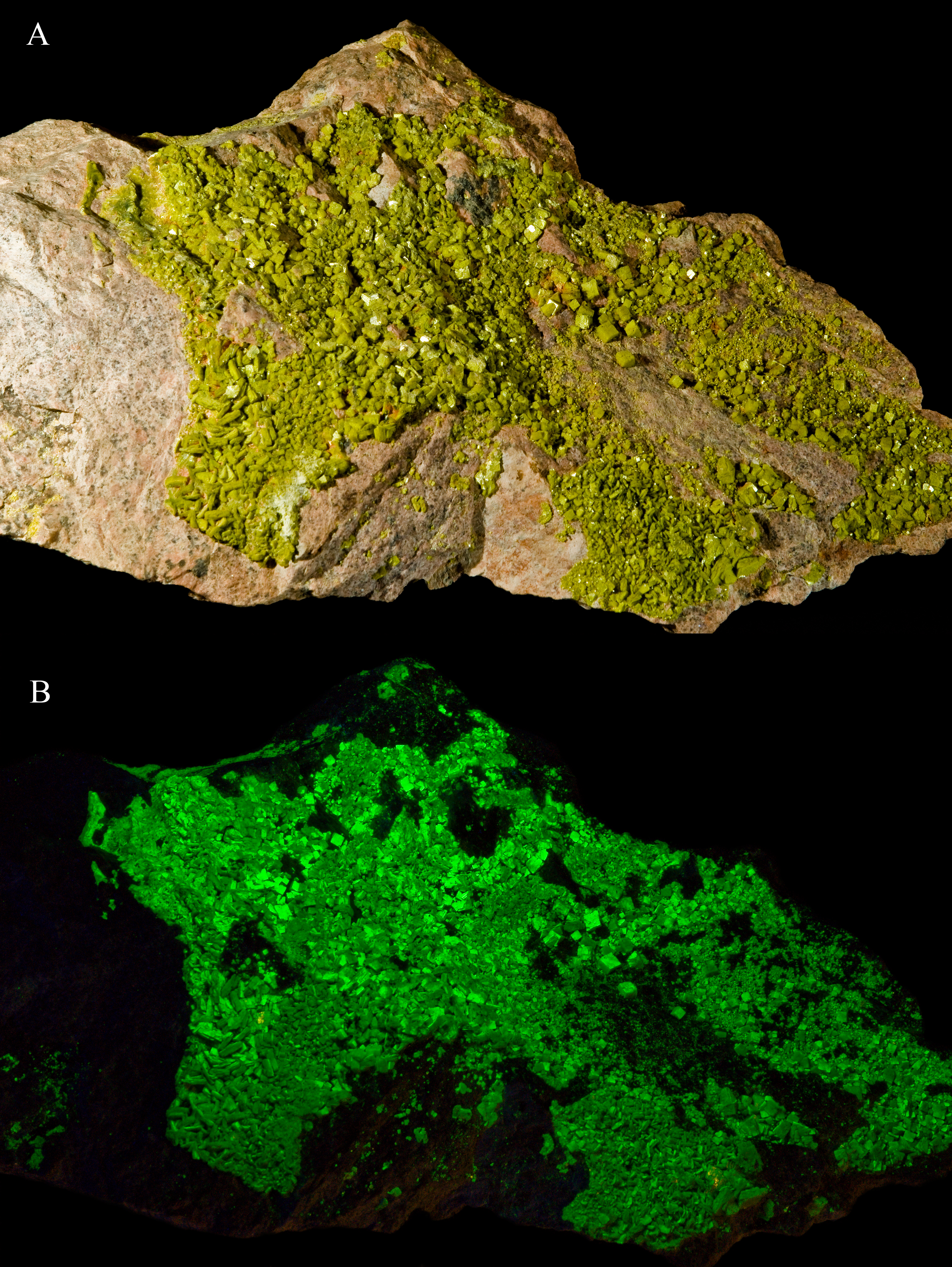
Autunite under UV light

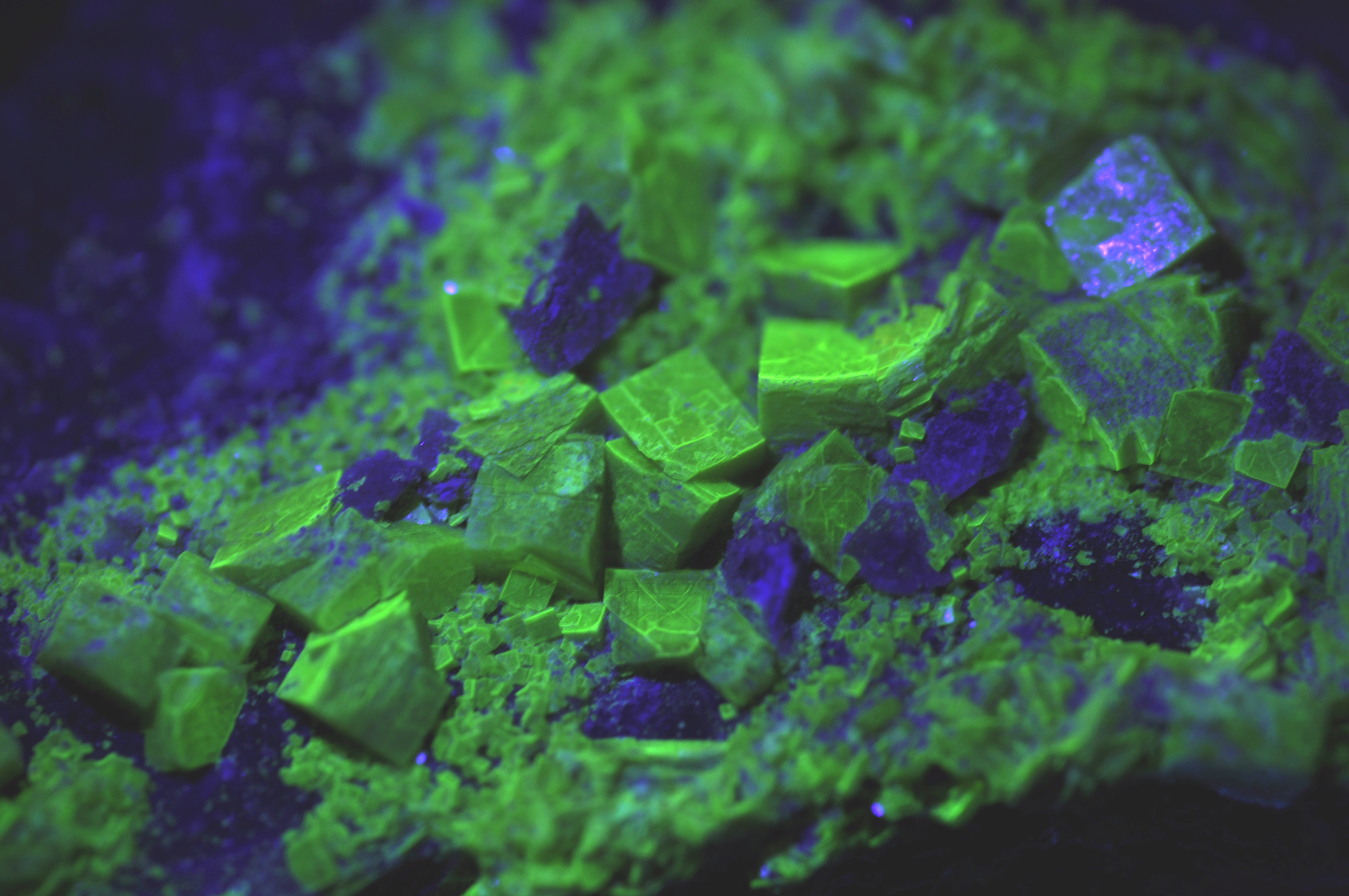
More crystals under UV light

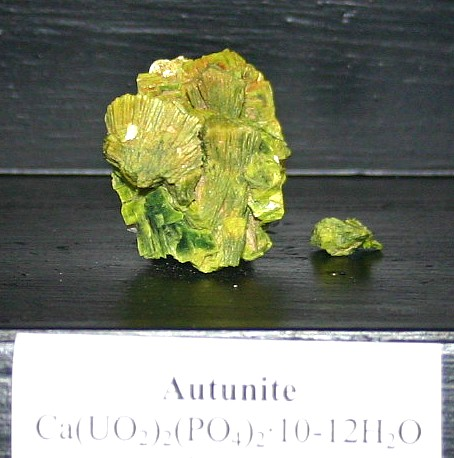
Scaly crystals of autunite

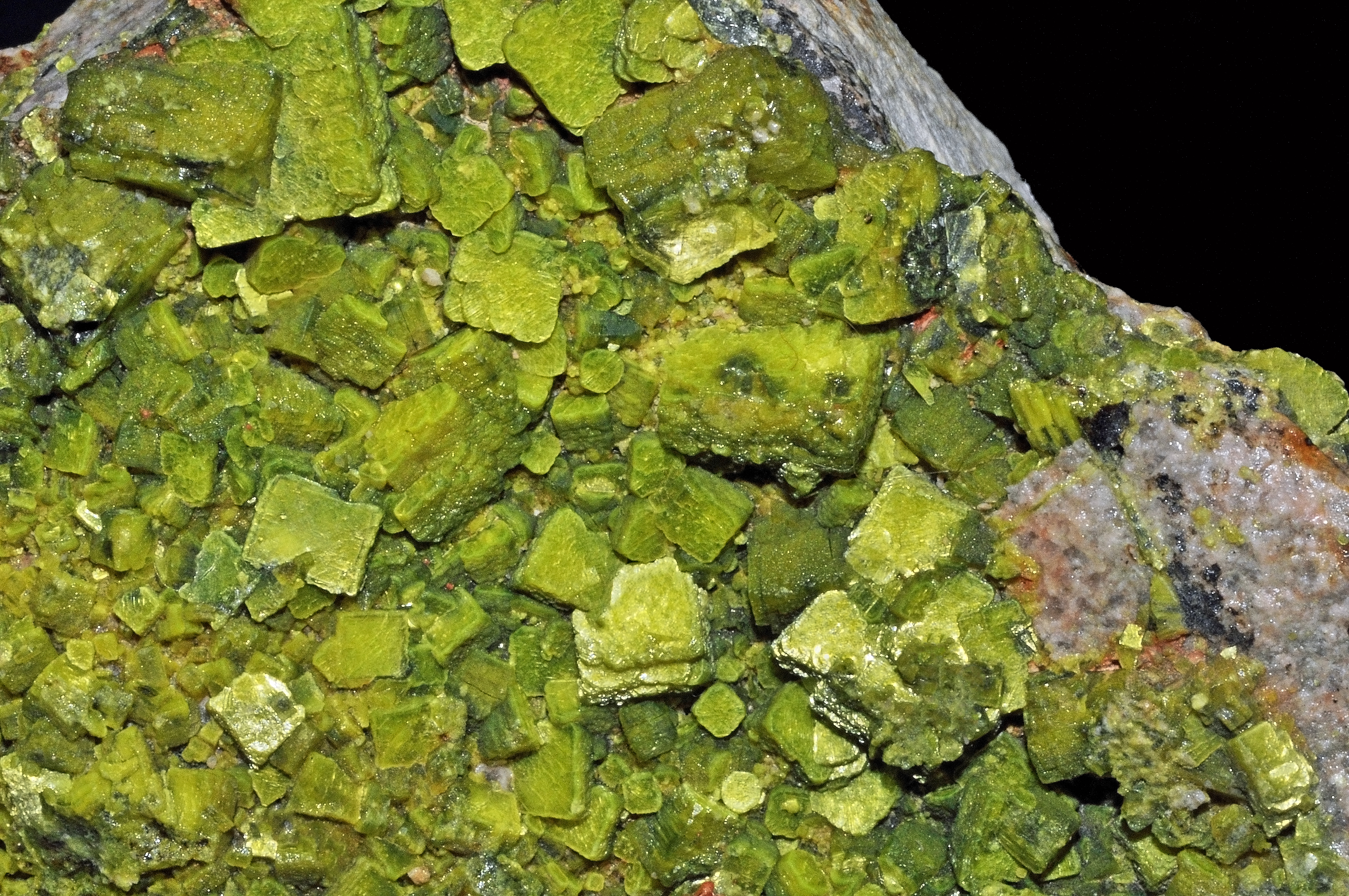
Autunite from France

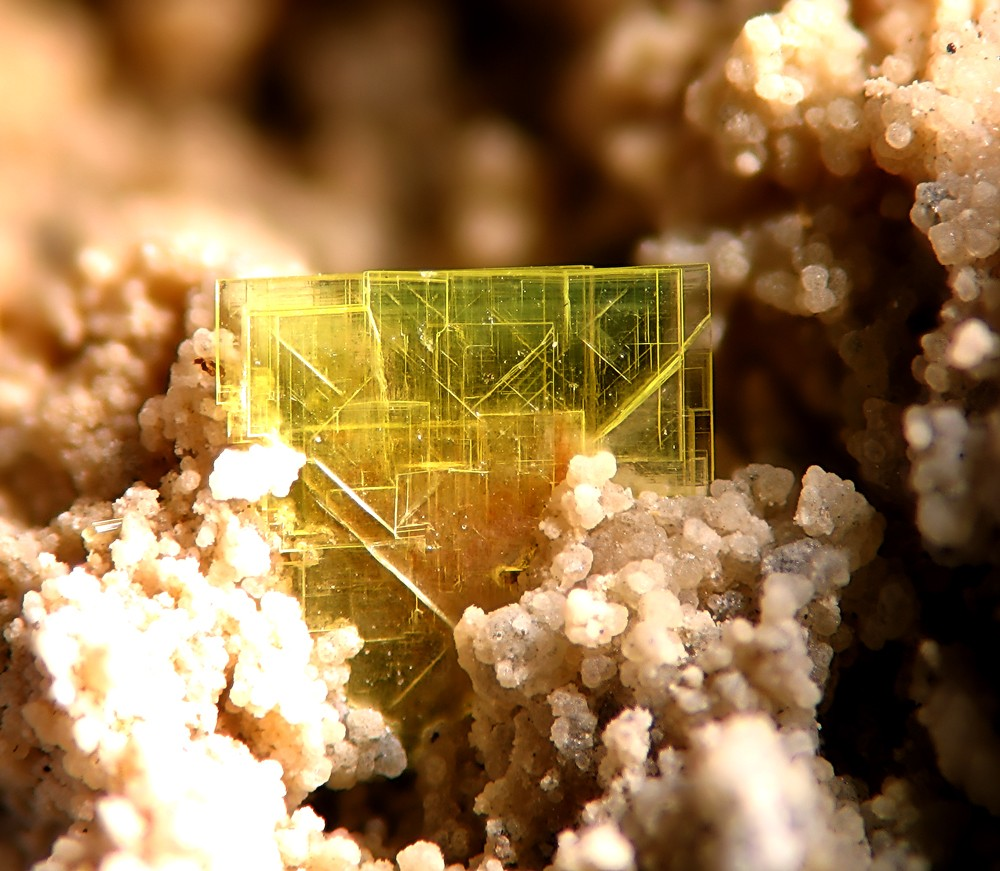
Close-up of an autunite crystal
