= Saleeite =

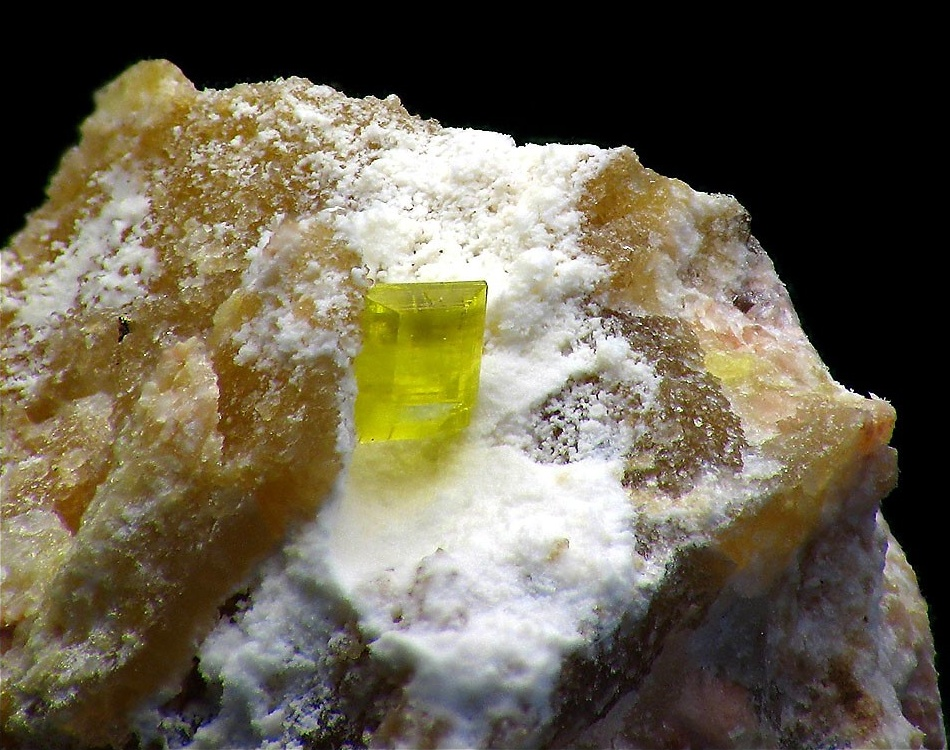

General
- Category: Phosphate minerals
- Formula: Mg(UO_{2})_{2}(PO_{4})_{2}·10(H_{2}O)
- Strunz classification: 08.EB.05
- Crystal system: Monoclinic
- Space group: Monoclinic 2/m
- Unit cell: a = 6.951(3) Å, b = 19.947(8) Å, c = 9.896(4) Å, β = 135.17(2)°; Z = 2

Identification
- Color: Lemon-yellow, straw-yellow, greenish yellow
- Crystal habit: Crystals are square plates, composite, flattened on {001}, with {001}, {100}, {120}, {012} (pseudotetragonal indices), to 2.5 cm; commonly in subparallel lamellar aggregates.
- Cleavage: On {001}, perfect; on {010}, {110}, indistinct
- Luster: Adamantine to waxy
- Diaphaneity: Transparent to opaque
- Specific gravity: 3.27
- Optical properties: Biaxial (−) typically nearly uniaxial
- Refractive index: nα = 1.554 – 1.559 nβ = 1.570 – 1.582 nγ = 1.571 – 1.585
- Birefringence: δ = 0.027
- Pleochroism: X = colorless; Z = pale greenish yellow
- 2V angle: 2V(meas.) = 0–61°
- Ultraviolet fluorescence: Fluoresces bright lemon-yellow under LW UV, pale yellow under SW UV
- Other characteristics: Radioactive

Saleeite is a secondary uranium mineral occurring in the oxidized zones of uranium deposits, or as disseminations in carnotite-bearing sandstones. Its chemical formula is Mg(UO_{2})_{2}(PO_{4})_{2}·10(H_{2}O).

It was discovered in 1932 at Shinkolobwe, Katanga Province, Democratic Republic of the Congo, and is named for Belgian mineralogist Achille Salée (1883–1932), Professor at Université catholique de Louvain, Belgium. It was later determined that the Katanga mineral was meta-saleeite Mg(UO_{2})_{2}(PO_{4})_{2}·8(H_{2}O) and the type locality was assigned to the Weißer Hirsch Mine, Neustädtel, Schneeberg District, Ore Mountains, Saxony, Germany.
