= Tutton =

Tutton may refer to:

- Tutton (surname)
- Tutton Point in Antarctica
- Tutton's salts, a family of complex sulfate or selenate salts
- R v Tutton, a decision by the Canadian Supreme Court
