= Langbeinites =

Class of chemical compounds

Langbeinites are a family of crystalline substances based on the structure of langbeinite with general formula M_{2}M'_{2}(SO_{4})_{3}, where M is a large univalent cation (such as potassium, rubidium, caesium, or ammonium), and M' is a small divalent cation (for example, magnesium, calcium, manganese, iron, cobalt, nickel, copper, zinc or cadmium). The sulfate group, SO^{2−}_{4}, can be substituted by other tetrahedral anions with a double negative charge such as tetrafluoroberyllate (BeF^{2−}_{4}), selenate (SeO^{2−}_{4}), chromate (CrO^{2−}_{4}), molybdate (MoO^{2−}_{4}), or tungstates. Although monofluorophosphates are predicted, they have not been described. By redistributing charges other anions with the same shape such as phosphate also form langbeinite structures. In these the M' atom must have a greater charge to balance the extra three negative charges.

At higher temperatures the crystal structure is cubic P2_{1}3. However, the crystal structure may change to lower symmetries at lower temperatures, for example, P2_{1}, P1, or P2_{1}2_{1}2_{1}. Usually this temperature is well below room temperature, but in a few cases the substance must be heated to acquire the cubic structure.

== Crystal structure ==
The crystal structures of langbeinites consist of a network of oxygen vertex-connected tetrahedral polyanions (such as sulfate) and distorted metal ion-oxygen octahedra. The unit cell contains four formula units. In the cubic form the tetrahedral anions are slightly rotated from the main crystal axes. When cooled, this rotation disappears and the tetrahedra align, resulting in lower energy as well as lower crystal symmetry.

== Examples ==
Sulfates include dithallium dicadmium sulfate, dirubidium dicadmium sulfate, dipotassium dicadmium sulfate, dithallium manganese sulfate, and dirubidium dicalcium trisulfate. Dipotassium dinickel sulfate can also be synthesized.

Selenates include diammonium dimanganese selenate. A diammonium dicadmium selenate langbeinite could not be crystallised from water, but a trihydrate exists.

Chromate based langbeinites include dicaesium dimanganese chromate.

Molybdates include Rb_{2}Co_{2}(MoO_{4})_{3}. Potassium members are absent, as are zinc and copper containing solids, which all crystallize in different forms. Manganese, magnesium, cadmium and some nickel double molybdates exist as langbeinites.

Double tungstates of the form A_{2}B_{2}(WO_{4})_{3} are predicted to exist in the langbeinite form.

An examples with tetrafluroberyllate is dipotassium dimanganese tetrafluoroberyllate (K_{2}Mn_{2}(BeF_{4})_{3}). Other tetrafluoroberyllates may include: Rb_{2}Mg_{2}(BeF_{4})_{3}; Tl_{2}Mg_{2}(BeF_{4})_{3}; Rb_{2}Mn_{2}(BeF_{4})_{3}; Tl_{2}Mn_{2}(BeF_{4})_{3}; Rb_{2}Ni_{2}(BeF_{4})_{3}; Tl_{2}Ni_{2}(BeF_{4})_{3}; Rb_{2}Zn_{2}(BeF_{4})_{3}; Tl_{2}Zn_{2}(BeF_{4})_{3}; Cs_{2}Ca_{2}(BeF_{4})_{3}; Rb_{2}Ca_{2}(BeF_{4})_{3}; RbCsMnCd(BeF_{4})_{3}; Cs_{2}MnCd(BeF_{4})_{3}; RbCsCd_{2}(BeF_{4})_{3}; Cs_{2}Cd_{2}(BeF_{4})_{3}; Tl_{2}Cd_{2}(BeF_{4})_{3}; (NH_{4})_{2}Cd_{2}(BeF_{4})_{3}; KRbMnCd(BeF_{4})_{3}; K_{2}MnCd(BeF_{4})_{3}; Rb_{2}MnCd(BeF_{4})_{3}; Rb_{2}Cd_{2}(BeF_{4})_{3}; RbCsCo_{2}(BeF_{4})_{3}; (NH_{4})_{2}Co_{2}(BeF_{4})_{3}; K_{2}Co_{2}(BeF_{4})_{3}; Rb_{2}Co_{2}(BeF_{4})_{3}; Tl_{2}Co_{2}(BeF_{4})_{3}; RbCsMn_{2}(BeF_{4})_{3}; Cs_{2}Mn_{2}(BeF_{4})_{3}; RbCsZn_{2}(BeF_{4})_{3}; (NH_{4})_{2}Mg_{2}(BeF_{4})_{3}; (NH_{4})_{2}Mn_{2}(BeF_{4})_{3}; (NH_{4})_{2}Ni_{2}(BeF_{4})_{3}; (NH_{4})_{2}Zn_{2}(BeF_{4})_{3};KRbMg_{2}(BeF_{4})_{3}; K_{2}Mg_{2}(BeF_{4})_{3}; KRbMn_{2}(BeF_{4})_{3}; K_{2}Ni_{2}(BeF_{4})_{3}; K_{2}Zn_{2}(BeF_{4})_{3}.

The phosphate containing langbeinites were found in 1972 with the discovery of KTi_{2}(PO_{4})_{3}, and since then a few more phosphates that also contain titanium have been found such as Na_{2}FeTi(PO_{4})_{3} and Na_{2}CrTi(PO_{4})_{3}. By substituting metals in A_{2}MTi(PO_{4})_{3}, A from (K, Rb, Cs), and M from (Cr, Fe, V), other langbeinites are made. The NASICON-type structure competes for these kinds of phosphates, so not all possibilities are langbeinites. Other phosphate based substances include K_{2}YTi(PO_{4})_{3}, K_{2}ErTi(PO_{4})_{3}, K_{2}YbTi(PO_{4})_{3}, K_{2}CrTi(PO_{4})_{3}, K_{2}AlSn(PO_{4})_{3}, KRbYbTi(PO_{4})_{3}. Sodium barium diiron tris-(phosphate) (NaBaFe_{2}(PO_{4})_{3}) is yet another variation with the same structure but differently charged ions. Most phosphates of this kind of formula do not form langbeinites, instead crystallise in the NASICON structure with archetype Na_{3}Zr_{2}(PO_{4})(SiO_{4})_{2}.

A langbeinite with arsenate is known to exist by way of K_{2}ScSn(AsO_{4})_{3}.

== Properties ==
=== Physical properties ===
Langbeinite-family crystals can show ferroelectric or ferroelastic properties. Diammonium dicadmium sulfate identified by Jona and Pepinsky with a unit cell size of 10.35 Å becomes ferroelectric when the temperature drops below 95 K. The phase transition temperature is not fixed, and can vary depending on the crystal or history of temperature change. So for example the phase transition in diammonium dicadmium sulfate can occur between 89 and 95 K. Under pressure the highest phase transition temperature increases. ∂T/∂P = 0.0035 degrees/bar. At 824 bars there is a triple point with yet another transition diverging at a slope of ∂T/∂P = 0.103 degrees/bar. For dipotassium dimanganese sulfate pressure causes the transition to rise at the rate of 6.86 °C/kbar. The latent heat of the transition is 456 cal/mol.

Dithallium dicadmium sulfate was shown to be ferroelectric in 1972.

Dipotassium dicadmium sulfate is thermoluminescent with stronger outputs of light at 350 and 475 K. This light output can be boosted forty times with a trace amount of samarium. Dipotassium dimagnesium sulfate doped with dysprosium develops thermoluminescence and mechanoluminescence after being irradiated with gamma rays. Since gamma rays occur naturally, this radiation induced thermoluminescence can be used to date evaporites in which langbeinite can be a constituent.

At higher temperatures the crystals take on cubic form, whereas at the lowest temperatures they can transform to an orthorhombic crystal group. For some types there are two more phases, and as the crystal is cooled it goes from cubic, to monoclinic, to triclinic to orthorhombic. This change to higher symmetry on cooling is very unusual in solids. For some langbeinites only the cubic form is known, but that may be because it has not been studied at low enough temperatures yet. Those that have three phase transitions go through these crystallographic point groups: P2_{1}3 – P2_{1} – P1 – P2_{1}2_{1}2_{1}, whereas the single phase change crystals only have P2_{1}3 – P2_{1}2_{1}2_{1}.

K_{2}Cd_{2}(SO_{4})_{3} has a transition temperature above room temperature, so that it is ferroelectric in standard conditions. The orthorhombic cell size is a=10.2082 Å, b=10.2837 Å, c=10.1661 Å.

Where the crystals change phase there is a discontinuity in the heat capacity. The transitions may show thermal hysteresis.

Different cations can be substituted so that for example K_{2}Cd_{2}(SO_{4})_{3} and Tl_{2}Cd_{2}(SO_{4})_{3} can form solid solutions for all ratios of thallium and potassium. Properties such as the phase transition temperature and unit cell sizes vary smoothly with the composition.

Langbeinites containing transition metals can be coloured. For example, cobalt langbeinite shows a broad absorption around 555 nm due to the cobalt ^{4}T_{1g}(F)→^{4}T_{1g}(P) electronic transition.

The enthalpy of formation (ΔfHm) for solid (NH_{4})_{2}Cd_{2}(SO_{4})_{3} at 298.2 K is −3031.74±0.08 kJ/mol, and for K_{2}Cd_{2}(SO_{4})_{3} it is −3305.52±0.17 kJ/mol.

=== Sulfates ===
Properties of langbeinites with sulfate anions
Formula	Weight (g/mol)	Comment / Symmetries	Transition temperature (K)			Density	Cell size (Å)	Refractive index
Formula	Weight (g/mol)	Comment / Symmetries	1	2	3	Density	Cell size (Å)	Refractive index
Na_{2}Mg_{2}(SO_{4})_{3}	382.78	3 phases, 1–2, >3	250	350	575			
K_{2}Mg_{2}(SO_{4})_{3}	414.99	4 phases langbeinite	51	54.9	63.8	2.832	9.9211	1.536
Rb_{2}Mg_{2}(SO_{4})_{3}	507.73	made				3.367	10.0051	1.556
Cs_{2}Mg_{2}(SO_{4})_{3}	602.61	no compound						
(NH_{4})_{2}Mg_{2}(SO_{4})_{3}	372.87	Efremovite	241	220		2.49	9.979	
Tl_{2}Mg_{2}(SO_{4})_{3}	745.56	≥3 phase		227.8	330.8			
K_{2}CaMg(SO_{4})_{3}	430.77	made				2.723	10.1662	1.525
K_{2}Ca_{2}(SO_{4})_{3}	446.54	4 phases calciolangbeinite	457			2.69 2.683	10.429Å a=10.334 b=10.501 c=10.186	Nα=1.522 Nβ=1.526 Nγ=1.527
Rb_{2}Ca_{2}(SO_{4})_{3}	539.28	2 phases	183			3.034	10.5687	1.520
Cs_{2}Ca_{2}(SO_{4})_{3}	634.15					3.417	10.7213	1.549
Tl_{2}Ca_{2}(SO_{4})_{3}		no compound						
(NH_{4})_{2}Ca_{2}(SO_{4})_{3}	404.42	made	158			2.297	10.5360	1.532
(NH_{4})_{2}V_{2}(SO_{4})_{3}	colour clear green					2.76	10.089	
K_{2}Mn_{2}(SO_{4})_{3}	476.26	manganolangbeinite 2 phases pale pink	191			3.02	10.014 (orthorhombic) a=10.081, b=10.108, c=10.048 Å	1.576
Rb_{2}Mn_{2}(SO_{4})_{3}	569	made				3.546	10.2147	1.590
Cs_{2}Mn_{2}(SO_{4})_{3}	663.87	predicted						
(NH_{4})_{2}Mn_{2}(SO_{4})_{2}	434.14	made				2.72	10.1908	
Tl_{2}Mn_{2}(SO_{4})_{3}	806.83	made				5.015	10.2236	1.722
K_{2}Fe_{2}(SO_{4})_{3}	478.07	made	?130					
Rb_{2}Fe_{2}(SO_{4})_{3}		predicted						
Tl_{2}Fe_{2}(SO_{4})_{3}	808.64	exists						
(NH_{4})_{2}Fe_{2}(SO_{4})_{3}	435.95	mineral ferroefremovite				2.84	10.068	1.574
K_{2}Co_{2}(SO_{4})_{3}	484.25	2 phases deep purple	126			3.280	9.9313	1.608
Rb_{2}Co_{2}(SO_{4})_{3}	576.99	made				3.807	10.0204	1.602
Cs_{2}Co_{2}(SO_{4})_{3}	671.87							
(NH_{4})_{2}Co_{2}(SO_{4})_{3}	442.13	made				2.94	9.997	
Tl_{2}Co_{2}(SO_{4})_{3}	813.82	made				5.361	10.0312	1.775
K_{2}Ni_{2}(SO_{4})_{3}	483.77	made light greenish yellow	0.74	1.14		3.369	9.8436	1.620
Rb_{2}Ni_{2}(SO_{4})_{3}	576.51	made				3.921	9.9217	1.636
Cs_{2}Ni_{2}(SO_{4})_{3}	671.39	predicted						
(NH_{4})_{2}Ni_{2}(SO_{4})_{3}	441.65	made	160			3.02	9.904	
Tl_{2}Ni_{2}(SO_{4})_{3}	814.34	predicted						
Rb_{2}Cu_{2}(S_{04})_{3}		predicted						
Cs_{2}Cu_{2}(S_{04})_{3}		predict not						
Tl_{2}Cu_{2}(S_{04})_{3}		predicted						
K_{2}Zn_{2}(SO_{4})_{3}	497.1	4 phases	75	138		3.376	9.9247	1.592
Rb_{2}Zn_{2}(S_{04})_{3}		predicted						
Cs_{2}Zn_{2}(S_{04})_{3}		predict not						
Tl_{2}Zn_{2}(S_{04})_{3}		predicted						
K_{2}Cd_{2}(SO_{4})_{3}	591.21	2 phases	432			2.615 3.677	a=10.212 b=10.280 c=10.171	Nα=1.588 Nγ=1.592
Rb_{2}Cd_{2}(SO_{4})_{3}	683.95	4 phases	66	103	129	4.060	10.3810	1.590
(NH_{4})_{2}Cd_{2}(SO_{4})_{3}	549.09	4 phases			95	3.288	10.3511	
Tl_{2}Cd_{2}(SO_{4})_{3}	921.78	4 phases	92	120	132	5.467	10.3841	1.730

== Fluoroberyllates ==
Properties of langbeinites with fluoroberyllate (BeF^{2−}_{4}) anion
Formula	Weight (g/mol)	Cell size (Å)	Volume	Density	Comment
K_{2}Mn_{2}(BeF_{4})_{3}					4 phases transition at 213
K_{2}Mg_{2}(BeF_{4})_{3}		9.875	962.8	1.59	
(NH_{4})_{2}Mg_{2}(BeF_{4})_{3}		9.968		1.37	
KRbMg_{2}(BeF_{4})_{3}		9.933		1.72	
Rb_{2}Mg_{2}(BeF_{4})_{3}		9.971		1.91	
Tl_{2}Mg_{2}(BeF_{4})_{3}		9.997		2.85	
K_{2}Ni_{2}(BeF_{4})_{3}		9.888		1.86	
Rb_{2}Ni_{2}(BeF_{4})_{3}		9.974		2.19	
Tl_{2}Ni_{2}(BeF_{4})_{3}		9.993		3.13	
K_{2}Co_{2}(BeF_{4})_{3}		9.963	988	1.82	
(NH_{4})_{2}Co_{2}(BeF_{4})_{3}		10.052		1.61	
Rb_{2}Co_{2}(BeF_{4})_{3}		10.061		2.14	
Tl_{2}Co_{2}(BeF_{4})_{3}		10.078		3.05	
RbCsCo_{2}(BeF_{4})_{3}		10.115		2.28	
K_{2}Zn_{2}(BeF_{4})_{3}		9.932		1.89	
(NH_{4})Zn_{2}(BeF_{4})_{3}		10.036		1.67	
Rb_{2}Zn_{2}(BeF_{4})_{3}		10.035		2.20	
Tl_{2}Zn_{2}(BeF_{4})_{3}		10.060		3.14	
RbCsZn_{2}(BeF_{4})_{3}		10.102		2.36	
K_{2}Mn_{2}(BeF_{4})_{3}		10.102		1.72	
KRbMn_{2}(BeF_{4})_{3}		10.187		1.82	
(NH_{4})_{2}Mn_{2}(BeF_{4})_{3}		10.217		1.50	
Rb_{2}Mn_{2}(BeF_{4})_{3}		10.243		2.00	
Tl_{2}Mn_{2}(BeF_{4})_{3}		10.255		2.87	
RbCsMn_{2}(BeF_{4})_{3}		10.327		2.12	
Cs_{2}Mn_{2}(BeF_{4})_{3}		10.376		2.26	
K_{2}MnCd(BeF_{4})_{3}		10.133		1.92	
KRbMnCd(BeF_{4})_{3}		10.220		2.04	
Rb_{2}MnCd(BeF_{4})_{3}		10.133		1.92	
RbCsMnCd(BeF_{4})_{3}		10.380		2.28	
Cs_{2}MnCd(BeF_{4})_{3}		10.451		2.41	
(NH_{4})_{2}Cd_{2}(BeF_{4})_{3}		10.342		1.87	
Rb_{2}Cd_{2}(BeF_{4})_{3}		10.385		2.32	
Tl_{2}Cd_{2}(BeF_{4})_{3}		10.402		3.16	
RbCsCd_{2}(BeF_{4})_{3}		10.474		2.43	
Cs_{2}Cd_{2}(BeF_{4})_{3}		10.558		2.53	
RbCsCdCa(BeF_{4})_{3}		10.501		2.15	
Rb_{2}Ca_{2}(BeF_{4})_{3}		10.480		1.74	
RbCsCa_{2}(BeF_{4})_{3}		10.583		1.86	
Cs_{2}Ca_{2}(BeF_{4})_{3}		10.672		1.98	
Cs_{2}Mg_{2}(BeF_{4})_{3}					does not exist

== Phosphates ==
Properties of langbeinites with phosphate (PO^{2−}_{4}) anion
Formula	Weight (g/mol)	Cell size (Å)	Density	Comment	ref
LiCs_{2}Y_{2}(PO_{4})_{3}	735.48	10.5945	4.108		
LiRb_{2}Y_{2}(PO_{4})_{3}				non-linear optical	
K_{2}YTi(PO_{4})_{3}	578.25	10.1053	3.192		
K_{2}ErTi(PO_{4})_{3}	584.03	10.094	3.722		
K_{2}YbTi(PO_{4})_{3}	499.89	10.1318	3.772		
K_{2}CrTi(PO_{4})_{3}	462.98	9.8001	3.267		
(NH_{4})(H_{3}O)Ti^{III}Ti^{IV}(PO_{4})_{3}	417.71	9.9384			
K_{2}Ti_{2}(PO_{4})_{3}	458.84	9.8688		Also K_{2−x}; dark blue, purplish	
Rb_{2}Ti_{2}(PO_{4})_{3}	551.58	9.9115			
Tl_{2}Ti_{2}(PO_{4})_{3}	789.41	9.9386			
Na_{2}FeTi(PO_{4})_{3}		9.837			
Na_{2}CrTi(PO_{4})_{3}		9.775			
K_{2}Mn_{0.5}Ti_{1.5}(PO_{4})_{3}		9.903	3.162	dark brown	
K_{2}Co_{0.5}Ti_{1.5}(PO_{4})_{3}		9.844	3.233	dark brown	
Rb_{4}NiTi_{3}(PO_{4})_{6}	1113.99÷2	9.9386			
K_{2}AlTi(PO_{4})_{3}	437.96	9.7641	3.125	colourless	
K_{2}TiYb(PO_{4})_{3}					
Li_{2}Zr_{2}(PO_{4})_{3}	481.24				
NaZr_{2}(PO_{4})_{3}	980,71	10.2088	3.06125	negative thermal expansion 25-500 °C	
K_{2}(Ce, ..., Lu)Zr(PO_{4})_{3}	594.45...629.3	10.29668			
Rb_{2}FeZr(PO_{4})_{3}	602.92	10.1199			
K_{2}FeZr(PO_{4})_{3}	510.18	10.0554		dark grey Note Na_{2}FeZr(PO_{4})_{3} is not a langbeinite.	
K_{2}YZr(PO_{4})_{3}	543.24	10.3346		random Y and Zr	
K_{2}GdZr(PO_{4})_{3}	611.58	10.3457		random Gd and Zr	
K_{2}GdHf(PO_{4})_{3}	698.85	10.3179	4.226		
K_{2}YHf(PO_{4})_{3}	630.51	10.3075	3.824		
Li(H_{2}O)_{2}Hf_{2}(PO_{4})_{3}	684.87	10.1993			
K_{2}BiHf(PO_{4})_{3}	750.58				
Li(H_{2}O)_{2}Zr_{2}(PO_{4})_{3}	510.33	10.2417			
K_{2}AlSn(PO_{4})_{3}	508.78	9.798			
K_{2}CrSn(PO_{4})_{3}		9.8741			
K_{2}InSn(PO_{4})_{3}		10.0460			
K_{2}FeSn(PO_{4})_{3}		9.921			
K_{2}YbSn(PO_{4})_{3}		10.150			
K_{4}Al_{3}Ta(PO_{4})_{6}	988.11	9.7262			
K_{4}Cr_{3}Ta(PO_{4})_{6}	1063.16	9.8315			
K_{4}Fe_{3}Ta(PO_{4})_{6}	1074.70	9.9092			
K_{4}Tb_{3}Ta(PO_{4})_{6}		10.3262			
K_{4}Ga_{3}Ta(PO_{4})_{6}					
K_{4}Gd_{3}Ta(PO_{4})_{6}					
K_{4}Dy_{3}Ta(PO_{4})_{6}					
K_{4}Ho_{3}Ta(PO_{4})_{6}					
K_{4}Er_{3}Ta(PO_{4})_{6}					
K_{4}Yb_{3}Ta(PO_{4})_{6}					
Rb_{4}Ga_{3}Ta(PO_{4})_{6}					
Rb_{4}Gd_{3}Ta(PO_{4})_{6}					
Rb_{4}Dy_{3}Ta(PO_{4})_{6}					
Rb_{4}Ho_{3}Ta(PO_{4})_{6}					
Rb_{4}Er_{3}Ta(PO_{4})_{6}					
Rb_{4}Yb_{3}Ta(PO_{4})_{6}					
K_{4}Fe_{3}Nb(PO_{4})_{6}	986.66	9.9092			
KBaEr_{2}(PO_{4})_{3}	795.857				
RbBaEr_{2}(PO_{4})_{3}	842.227				
CsBaEr_{2}(PO_{4})_{3}	889.665				
(Rb,Cs)_{2}(Pr,Er)Zr(PO_{4})_{3}					
KCsFeZrP_{3}O_{12}	603.99	10.103			
CaFe_{3}O(PO_{4})_{3}	508.53				
SrFe_{3}O(PO_{4})_{3}	556.1				
PbFe_{3}O(PO_{4})_{3}	675.6				
KSrFe_{2}(PO_{4})_{3}	523.32	9.809	3.68	yellowish	
Pb_{1.5}V^{IV}_{2}(PO_{4})_{3}	697.6	9.7818	4.912		
K_{2}TiV(PO_{4})_{3}		9.855		green	
BaTiV(PO_{4})_{3}		9.922	3.54	at high temperature > 950 °C dark grey	
KBaV_{2}(PO_{4})_{3}		9.873		greenish yellow	
Ba_{1.5}V_{2}(PO_{4})_{3}		9.884		grey	
Ba_{1.5}Fe^{3+}_{2}(PO_{4})_{3}	602.59				
KSrSc_{2}(PO_{4})_{3}	501.54				
Rb_{0.743}K_{0.845}Co_{0.293}Ti_{1.707}(PO_{4})_{3}		9.8527			
K_{2}BiZr(PO_{4})_{6}	663.32	10.3036			
KBaSc_{2}(PO_{4})_{3}	503.25				
KBaIn_{2}(PO_{4})_{3}					
KBaRZrP_{2}SiO_{12}				R = La, Nd, Sm, Eu, Gd, Dy, Y	
KBaYSnP_{2}SiO_{12}	666.07				
KBaFe_{2}(PO_{4})_{3}	525.03	9.8732 (at 4 K)			
KBaCr_{2}(PO_{4})_{3}	517.33	9.7890			
Rb_{2}FeTi(PO_{4})_{3}	511.56	9.8892		Na_{2}FeTi(PO_{4})_{3} has NZP structure	
K_{5/3}MgTi_{4/3}(PO_{4})_{3}		9.836			
KBaMgTi(PO_{4})_{3}	485.51	9.914		KSrMgTi crystallises in kosnarite form	
KPbMgTi(PO_{4})_{3}	555.39	9.8540		KSrMgTi in kosnarite form	
RbBaMgTi(PO_{4})_{3}		9.954		CsBa does not form	
RbPbMgTi(PO_{4})_{3}	601.76	9.9090		CsPb does not form	
K_{5/3}MgZr_{4/3}(PO_{4})_{3}		10.176			
KSrMgZr(PO_{4})_{3}	479.16	10.165			
KPbMgZr(PO_{4})_{3}	598.74	10.111			
KBaMgZr(PO_{4})_{3}	528.87	10.106			
RbSrMgZr(PO_{4})_{3}	525.53	10.218			
RbPbMgZr(PO_{4})_{3}	645.11	10.178			
RbBaMgZr(PO_{4})_{3}	575.24	10.178			
CsSrMgZr(PO_{4})_{3}	572.97	10.561		over 1250 °C forms kosnarite phase	
Ba_{3}In_{4}(PO_{4})_{6}		10.1129			
Ba_{3}V_{4}(PO_{4})_{6}	1185.58	9.8825	4.08	yellow-green	
KPbCr_{2}(PO_{4})_{3}		9.7332			
KPbFe_{2}(PO_{4})_{3}		9.8325		beige	
K_{4}NiZr_{3}(PO_{4})_{6}	529.29 (half)	10.1572		light yellow	
K_{4}NiHf_{3}(PO_{4})_{6}	660.192 (half)	10.12201	4.228	yellow	
NaBaBi_{2}(PO_{3})_{3}					
K_{2}ScTi(PO_{4})_{3}				lilac	
Pb_{2}CoFe(PO_{4})_{3}		9.7933			
Ba_{2}FeCo(PO_{4})_{3}		9.9081		orange	
RbSrSc_{2}(PO_{4})_{3}		10.02879			
Cs_{2}U^{IV}Ce(PO_{4})_{3}	928.89	10.8588	4.819		
Cs_{2}U^{IV}Pr(PO_{4})_{3}	929.67	10.8392	4.849		
Cs_{2}U^{IV}Nd(PO_{4})_{3}	933.01	10.8287	4.88		
Cs_{2}U^{IV}Sm(PO_{4})_{3}	939.11	10.8069	4.942		
Cs_{2}U^{IV}Eu(PO_{4})_{3}	940.73	10.7822	4.985		
Cs_{2}U^{IV}Gd(PO_{4})_{3}	946.02	10.7728	5.026		
Cs_{2}U^{IV}Tb(PO_{4})_{3}	947.69	10.7591	5.054		
Cs_{2}U^{IV}Dy(PO_{4})_{3}	951.26	10.7428	5.096		
Cs_{2}U^{IV}Ho(PO_{4})_{3}	953.70	10.7276	5.131		
Cs_{2}U^{IV}Er(PO_{4})_{3}	956.03	10.7127	5.165		
Cs_{2}U^{IV}Tm(PO_{4})_{3}	957.69	10.6888	5.209		
Cs_{2}U^{IV}Yb(PO_{4})_{3}	961.81	10.6787	5.246		
Cs_{2}U^{IV}Lu(PO_{4})_{3}	963.74	10.6619	5.282		

== Phosphate silicates ==
substance	formula weight	unit cell edge Å	density	comment	ref
K_{2}Sn_{2}(PO_{4})_{2}SiO_{4}				Stable to 650 °C	
K_{2}Zr_{2}(PO_{4})_{2}SiO_{4}				Stable to 1000 °C	
Rb_{2}Zr_{2}(PO_{4})_{2}SiO_{4}					
Cs_{2}Zr_{2}(PO_{4})_{2}SiO_{4}					
CsKZr_{2}(PO_{4})_{2}SiO_{4}					
KBaZrY(PO_{4})_{2}SiO_{4}					
KBaZrLa(PO_{4})_{2}SiO_{4}					
KBaZrNd(PO_{4})_{2}SiO_{4}					
KBaZrSm(PO_{4})_{2}SiO_{4}					
KBaZrEu(PO_{4})_{2}SiO_{4}					

== Mixed anion phosphates ==
substance	formula weight	unit cell edge Å	density	comment	ref
K_{2}MgTi(SO_{4})(PO_{4})_{2}					
K_{2}Fe_{2}(MoO_{4})(PO_{4})_{2}					
K_{2}Sc_{2}(MoO_{4})(PO_{4})_{2}					
K_{2}Sc_{2}(WO_{4})(PO_{4})_{2}					

== Vanadates ==
The orthovanadates have four formula per cell, with a slightly distorted cell that has orthorhombic symmetry.

	formula weight	comment	Cell dimensions Å			Volume	density	refractive
Formula	g/mol	symmetries	a	b	c			index
LiBaCr_{2}(VO_{4})_{3}	593.08	Orthorhombic	9.98	10.52	9.51	998	4.02	
NaBaCr_{2}(VO_{4})_{3}	609.13	Orthorhombic	9.99	10.52	9.53	1002	4.09	
AgBaCr_{2}(VO_{4})_{3}	694.00	Orthorhombic	10.02	10.53	9.53	1005	4.62	

== Arsenates ==
substance	formula weight	unit cell edge Å	density
K_{2}ScSn(AsO_{4})_{3}	658.62	10.3927	
Zr_{2}NH_{4}(AsO_{4})_{3}·H_{2}O	632.558	10.532	3.379

== Selenates ==
Langbeinite structured double selenates are difficult to make, perhaps because selenate ions arranged around the dication leave space for water, so hydrates crystallise from double selenate solutions. For example, when ammonia selenate and cadmium selenate solution is crystallized it forms diammonium dicadmium selenate trihydrate: (NH_{4})_{2}Cd_{2}(SeO_{4})_{3}·3H_{2}O and when heated it loses both water and ammonia to form a pyroselenate rather than a langbeinite.

substance	formula weight	unit cell edge Å	density	note
(NH_{4})_{2}Mn_{2}(SeO_{4})_{3}	574.83	10.53	3.26	forms continuous series with SO_{4} too

== Molybdates ==
substance	formula weight	unit cell edge Å	density	ref
Cs_{2}Cd_{2}(MoO_{4})_{3}	970.5	11.239		
Rb_{2}Co_{2}(MoO_{4})_{3}	768.7			
Cs_{2}Co_{2}(MoO_{4})_{3}				
Cs_{2}Fe_{2}(MoO_{4})_{3}		10.9112		
Cs_{2}Ni_{2}(MoO_{4})_{3}	863.01	10.7538		
(H_{3}O)_{2}Mn_{2}(MoO_{4})_{3}	627.75	10.8713		
K_{2}Mn_{2}(MoO_{4})_{3}				
KMn_{0.25}Mg_{0.25}Co_{0.25}Zn_{0.25}InMo_{3}O_{12}				
Tl_{1.85}K_{0.15}Mg_{2}(MoO_{4})_{3}		10.6851		
Tl_{1.85}Rb_{0.15}Mg_{2}(MoO_{4})_{3}		10.69463		

== Tungstates ==
substance	formula weight	unit cell edge Å	density
Rb_{2}Mg_{2}(WO_{4})_{3}	963.06	10.766	
Cs_{2}Mg_{2}(WO_{4})_{3}	1057.93	10.878	

== Preparation ==
Diammonium dicadmium sulfate can be made by evaporating a solution of ammonium sulfate and cadmium sulfate. Dithallium dicadmium sulfate can be made by evaporating a water solution at 85 °C. Other substances may be formed during crystallisation from water such as Tutton's salts or competing compounds like Rb_{2}Cd_{3}(SO_{4})_{4}·5H_{2}O.

Potassium and ammonium nickel langbeinite can be made from nickel sulfate and the other sulfates by evaporating a water solution at 85 °C.

Dipotassium dizinc sulfate can be formed into large crystals by melting zinc sulfate and potassium sulfate together at 753 K. A crystal can be slowly drawn out of the melt from a rotating crucible at about 1.2 mm every hour.

Li(H_{2}O)_{2}Hf_{2}(PO_{4})_{3} can be made by heating HfCl_{4}, Li_{2}B_{4}O_{7}, H_{3}PO_{4}, water and hydrochloric acid to 180 °C for eight days under pressure. Li(H_{2}O)_{2}Hf_{2}(PO_{4})_{3} converts to Li_{2}Hf_{2}(PO_{4})_{3} on heating to 200 °C.

The sol-gel method produces a gel from a solution mixture, which is then heated. Rb_{2}FeZr(PO_{4})_{3} can be made by mixing solutions of FeCl_{3}, RbCl, ZrOCl_{2}, and dripping in H_{3}PO_{4}. The gel produced was dried out at 95 °C and then baked at various temperatures from 400 to 1100 °C.

Langbeinites crystals can be made by the Bridgman technique, Czochralski process or flux technique.

A Tutton's salt may be heat treated and dehydrate, e.g. (NH_{4})_{2}Mn_{2}(SeO_{4})_{3} can be made from (NH_{4})_{2}Mn(SeO_{4})_{3}·6(H_{2}O) heated to 100 °C, forming (NH_{4})_{2}(SeO_{4}) as a side product. Similarly the ammonium vanadium Tutton's salt, (NH_{4})_{2}V(SO_{4})_{2}, heated to 160 °C in a closed tube produces (NH_{4})_{2}V_{2}(SO_{4})_{3}. At lower temperatures a hydroxy compound is formed.

== Use ==
Few uses have been made of these substances. Langbeinite itself can be used as an "organic" fertiliser with potassium, magnesium and sulfur, all needed for plant growth. Electrooptic devices could be made from some of these crystals, particularly those that have cubic transition temperatures as temperatures above room temperature. Research continues into this. Ferroelectric crystals could store information in the location of domain walls.

The phosphate langbeinites are insoluble, stable against heat, and can accommodate a large number of different ions, and have been considered for immobilizing unwanted radioactive waste.

Zirconium phosphate langbeinites containing rare earth metals have been investigated for use in white LEDs and plasma displays. Langbeinites that contain bismuth are photoluminescent. In case of iron-containing ones complex magnetic behavior may be found.

Some members of the sulphate and the phosphate langbeinites are potential quantum spin liquid materials. Research is ongoing.
