= Tutton (surname) =

Tutton is a British surname that may refer to:

- Aden Tutton (born 1984), Australian volleyball player
- Alan Tutton (born 1973), English football player
- Alexander P. Tutton (1823–1893), Supervisor of Internal Revenue under President Ulysses S. Grant during the Whiskey Ring scandal
- Alfred Edwin Howard Tutton (1864–1938), British mineralogist; identifier of Tutton's salts; namesake of Tutton Point in Antarctica
- Chloe Tutton (born 1996), Welsh swimmer
- Chris Tutton, English poet, musician, songwriter, playwright, and performer
- Diana Tutton (1915–1991), British novelist
