= Iron(III) selenate =

Names
- Other names Ferric selenate

Identifiers
CAS Number	anhydrous: 13718-77-9; nonahydrate: 166547-62-2
3D model (JSmol)	anhydrous: Interactive image; nonahydrate: Interactive image
PubChem CID	anhydrous: 173006955
- InChI: anhydrous: InChI=1S/2Fe.3H2O4Se/c;;3*1-5(2,3)4/h;;3*(H2,1,2,3,4)/q2*+3;;;/p-6 Key: PFTVEPALUVHDAU-UHFFFAOYSA-H; nonahydrate: InChI=1S/2Fe.3H2O4Se.9H2O/c;;3*1-5(2,3)4;;;;;;;;;/h;;3*(H2,1,2,3,4);9*1H2/q2*+3;;;;;;;;;;;;/p-6 Key: HXMHGUVXPLYSAA-UHFFFAOYSA-H
- SMILES: anhydrous: [O-][Se](=O)(=O)[O-].[O-][Se](=O)(=O)[O-].[O-][Se](=O)(=O)[O-].[Fe+3].[Fe+3]; nonahydrate: [O-][Se](=O)(=O)[O-].[O-][Se](=O)(=O)[O-].[O-][Se](=O)(=O)[O-].[Fe+3].[Fe+3].O.O.O.O.O.O.O.O.O

Properties
Chemical formula	Fe_{2}(SeO_{4})_{3}
Molar mass	540.60 g/mol
Appearance	Dark yellow solid (anhydrous); Colorless crystals (nonahydrate)
Density	3.96 g/cm^{3} (anhydrous); 2.46 g/cm^{3} (nonahydrate)
Solubility in water	Soluble in water

Structure
Crystal structure	Monoclinic (anhydrous)
Space group	P2_{1}/n, No. 14
Lattice constant	a = 0.8530 nm, b = 0.8888 nm, c = 1.1952 nm α = 90°, β = 91.13°, γ = 90°
Formula units (Z)	4
- Except where otherwise noted, data are given for materials in their standard state (at 25 °C [77 °F], 100 kPa). Infobox references

Iron(III) selenate is an inorganic compound of iron and the selenate ion, with the chemical formula Fe_{2}(SeO_{4})_{3}. Both anhydrous and hydrated forms are known, including a well-characterized nonahydrate, Fe_{2}(SeO_{4})_{3}·9H_{2}O.

== Structure ==
Anhydrous Fe_{2}(SeO_{4})_{3} crystallizes in the monoclinic crystal system, in space group P2_{1}/n (No. 14). Its lattice parameters are a = 8.530(2) Å, b = 8.888(2) Å, c = 11.952(2) Å and β = 91.13(1)°, with four formula units per unit cell.

The structure is built from FeO_{6} octahedra and SeO_{4} tetrahedra linked by shared oxygen atoms.

The nonahydrate is isostructural with the sulfate mineral coquimbite. It crystallizes in the trigonal space group P3̅1c and contains Fe-centred octahedra, SeO_{4} tetrahedra and both coordinated and interstitial water molecules linked by an extensive hydrogen-bonding network. The hydrogen positions in Fe_{2}(SeO_{4})_{3}·9H_{2}O have been used as a structural model for the corresponding coquimbite sulfate structure.

== Preparation ==
Anhydrous iron(III) selenate can be prepared hydrothermally by reaction of iron(II) oxalate with selenic acid at about 450 K (177 °C).

The nonahydrate can be crystallized at room temperature from aqueous solutions acidified with selenic acid.

Iron(III) selenate can also be obtained by reaction of iron(III) oxide or hydroxide with selenic acid.

== Thermal decomposition ==
Iron(III) selenate is less thermally stable than the corresponding iron(III) sulfate.

On heating, the nonahydrate loses water between approximately 45 and 200 °C, passing through lower hydrates including the tetrahydrate, dihydrate and monohydrate. Near 230 °C, anhydrous Fe_{2}(SeO_{4})_{3} is formed, accompanied by partial reduction of Se(VI) to Se(IV).

Further heating decomposes the anhydrous selenate. Intermediate mixed selenite–selenate phases form before iron(III) oxide becomes the final iron-containing product at higher temperature.

== Double salts ==
Iron(III) selenate forms double salts with alkali metal selenates. One example is the alum-like compound CsFe(SeO_{4})_{2}·12H_{2}O, whose structure has been determined by low-temperature neutron diffraction.

The caesium iron selenate double salt crystallizes in the cubic space group Pa3̅ and adopts the α-alum structure.
