= Ammonium magnesium sulfate =

Names
- IUPAC name magnesium;azane;hydrogen sulfate
- Other names Diammonium magnesium bis(sulfate)

Identifiers
CAS Number	7785-18-4
3D model (JSmol)	Interactive image
ChemSpider	21160313
ECHA InfoCard	100.035.242
EC Number	238-782-2
PubChem CID	118856368
- InChI: InChI=1S/Mg.2H3N.2H2O4S/c;;;2*1-5(2,3)4/h;2*1H3;2*(H2,1,2,3,4)/q+2;;;;/p-2 Key: DCNGHDHEMTUKNP-UHFFFAOYSA-L
- SMILES: N.N.OS(=O)(=O)[O-].OS(=O)(=O)[O-].[Mg+2]

Properties
Chemical formula	H_{8}MgN_{2}O_{8}S_{2}
Molar mass	252.50 g·mol^{−1}
Appearance	crystals
Density	1,723 g/cm^{3} (hexahydrate)
Solubility in water	soluble
- Except where otherwise noted, data are given for materials in their standard state (at 25 °C [77 °F], 100 kPa). Infobox references

Ammonium magnesium sulfate is a chemical compound with the chemical formula (NH_{4})_{2}Mg(SO_{4})_{2}. It forms hydrates.

== Synthesis ==
The compound is prepared by reduction of ammonium persulfate with magnesium metal.

== Physical properties ==
Ammonium magnesium sulfate forms crystals, soluble in water.

The compound forms a crystallohydrate containing Mg(NH_{4})_{2}(SO_{4})_{2} · 6H_{2}O—colorless crystals of monoclinic system, space group P21/c, coordinate parameters a = 0.928 nm, b = 1.257 nm, c = 0.620 nm, β = 107.1°, Z = 4.

== Natural occurrence ==
Ammonium magnesium sulfate hexahydrate naturally occurs as Boussingaultite, a rare mineral of picromerite group, originally described from geothermal fields in Tuscany, Italy, where it occurs together with its iron analogue mohrite.

== See also ==
- Mohr's salt
