= Godovikovite =

Sulfate mineral

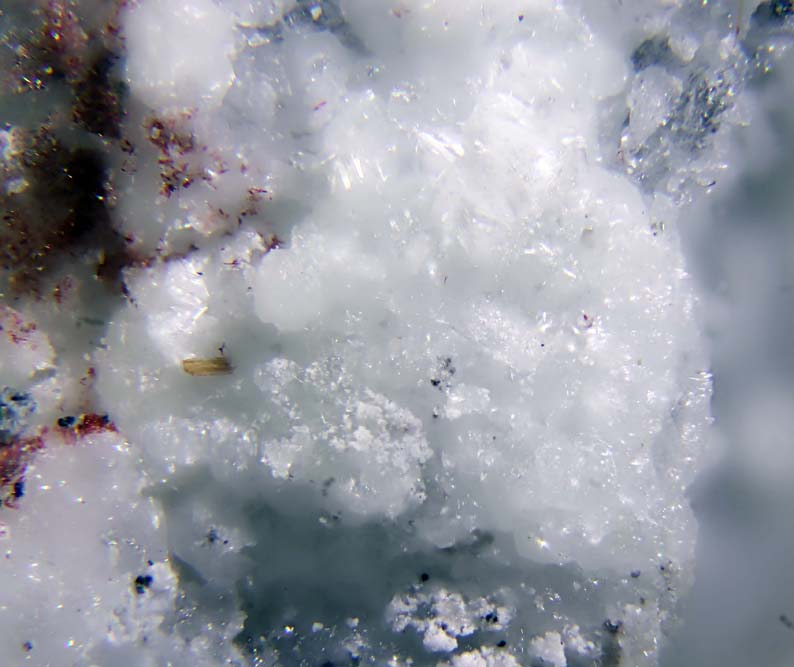
- White godovikovite with minor red demicheleite-(Cl) (IMA 2008-020) from La Fossa Crater, Vulcano Island, Messina Province, Sicily, Italy

General
- Category: Sulfates
- Formula: (NH_{4})(Al,Fe+3)(SO_{4})2
- IMA symbol: God
- Strunz classification: 07.AC.20(07)
- Dana classification: 28.03.05.02
- Crystal system: Trigonal
- Crystal class: Trapezohedral
- Space group: Trigonal enantiomorph
- Unit cell: a = 4.75Å, c = 8.30(1)Å

Identification
- Formula mass: 244.36
- Colour: White, colourless
- Crystal habit: Very small hexagonal blades
- Fracture: Uneven
- Mohs scale hardness: 2
- Luster: Earthy/dull
- Streak: White
- Diaphaneity: Transparent to translucent
- Density: 2.53
- Birefringence: 0.009
- Solubility: Slowly in H2O

Godovikovite is a rare sulfate mineral with the chemical formula: (NH_{4})Al(SO_{4})_{2}. Aluminium can partially be substituted by iron. Hydration of godovikovite gives the ammonium alum, tschermigite. The mineral forms cryptocrystalline, often porous, masses, usually of white colour. Single crystals are very small hexagonal blades. Typical environment for godovikovite are burning coal sites (mainly dumps). There the mineral acts, together with millosevichite, as one of the main components of so-called sulfate crust.

It was first described in 1988 for an occurrence in the Chelyabinsk coal basin, Chelyabinsk Oblast, Southern Urals, Russia, and named for Russian mineralogist Aleksandrovich Godovikov (1927–1995).
