= Efremovite =

Rare ammonium sulfate mineral

General
- Category: Sulfate minerals
- Formula: (NH_{4})_{2}Mg_{2}(SO_{4})_{3}
- IMA symbol: Efr
- Strunz classification: 7.AC.10
- Crystal system: Cubic
- Crystal class: Tetartoidal (23); H-M symbol: (23)
- Unit cell: a = 9.99 Å; Z = 2

Identification
- Color: White to gray
- Crystal habit: Equant grains and crusts
- Cleavage: None
- Fracture: Uneven
- Mohs scale hardness: 2
- Luster: Vitreous
- Diaphaneity: Transparent to nearly opaque
- Specific gravity: 2.52 (calculated)
- Optical properties: Isotropic
- Refractive index: n = 1.550
- Alters to: Readily hygroscopic

Efremovite is a rare ammonium sulfate mineral with the chemical formula: (NH_{4})_{2}Mg_{2}(SO_{4})_{3}. It is a white to gray cubic mineral. This anhydrous sulfate occurs as constituent in sulfate crusts of burning coal dumps. It is hygroscopic and when exposed to humid air it slowly converts to the hydrate form, boussingaultite.

It was first described in 1989 for an occurrence in the Chelyabinsk coal basin, Southern Urals, Russia. It was named for Russian geologist Ivan Antonovich Yefremov (1907–1972). It has also been reported from several coal mining areas across Europe. It occurs in association with native sulfur, kladnoite, mascagnite, and boussingaultite.
