= Ammonium iron(III) sulfate =

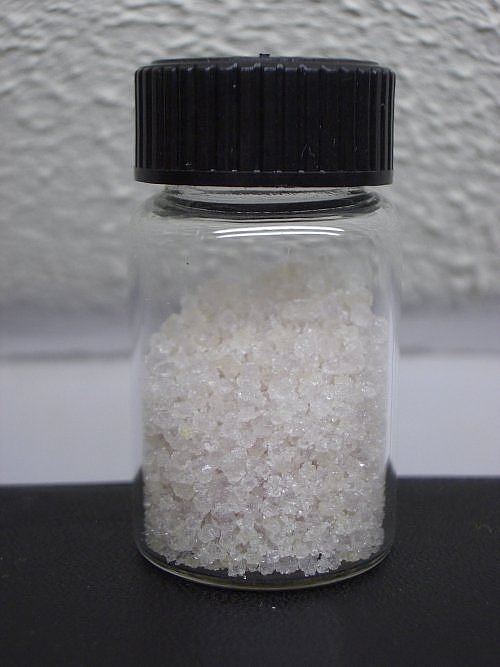

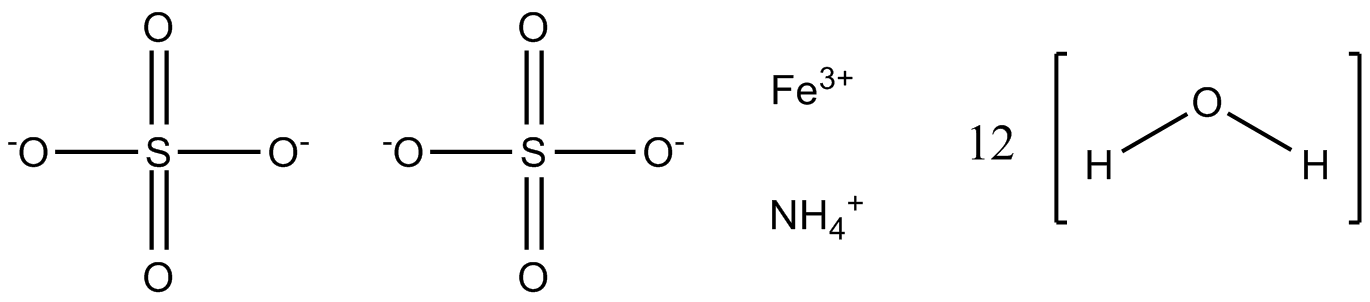

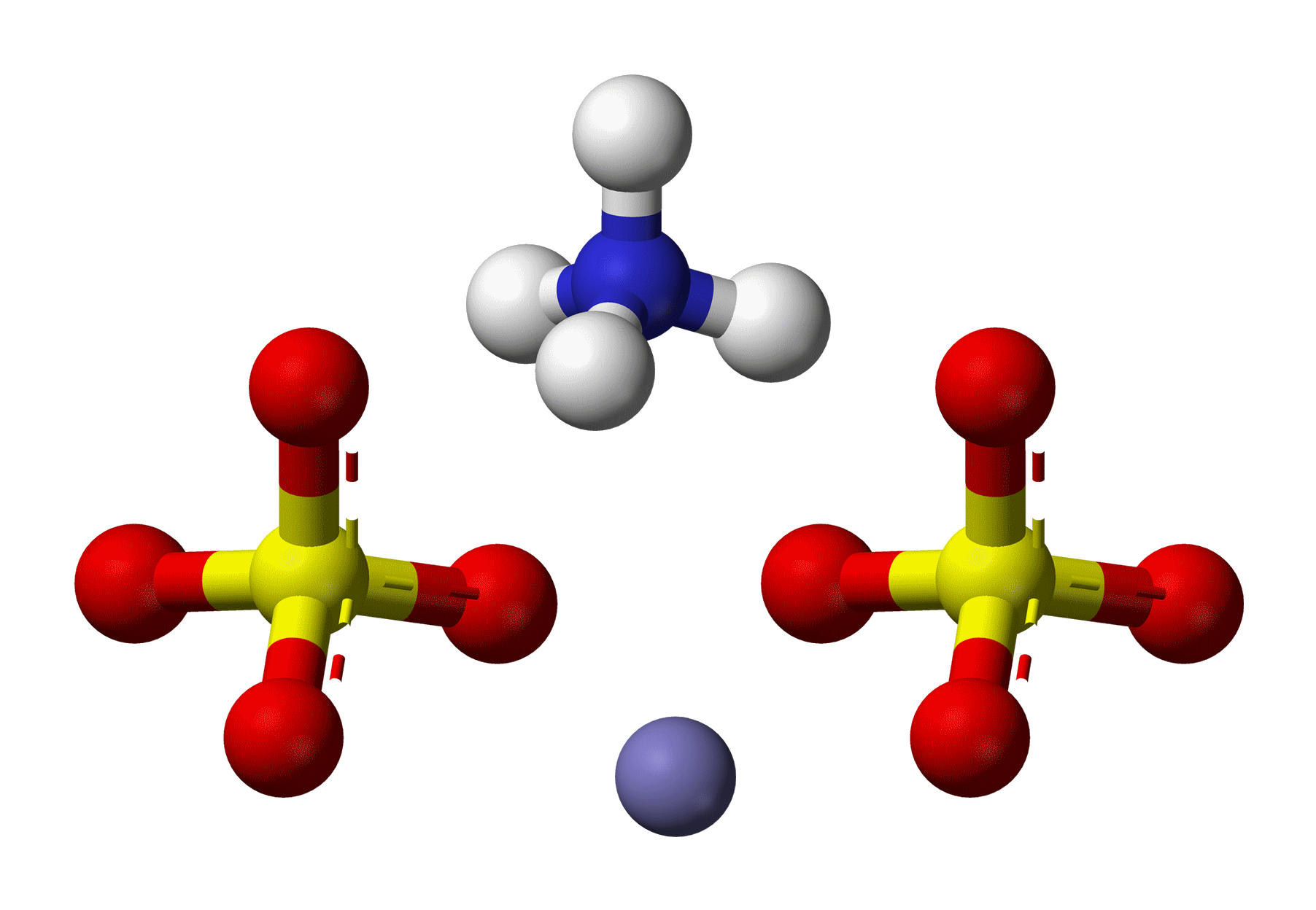

Names
- IUPAC name Ammonium iron(III) sulfate
- Other names Ferric ammonium sulfate Ferric alum

Identifiers
| CAS Number | anhydride: 10138-04-2; dodecahydrate: 7783-83-7 |
| 3D model (JSmol) | anhydride: Interactive image |
| ChemSpider | anhydride: 55405 |
| ECHA InfoCard | 100.030.335 |
| EC Number | anhydride: 233-382-4 |
| PubChem CID | anhydride: 61485; dodecahydrate: 197097 |
| UNII | anhydride: LUX2X1H1IC; dodecahydrate: 65390568Z5 |
| CompTox Dashboard (EPA) | anhydride: DTXSID8051417 |
- InChI: InChI=1S/Fe.H3N.2H2O4S/c;;2*1-5(2,3)4/h;1H3;2*(H2,1,2,3,4)/q+3;;;/p-3 Key: XGGLLRJQCZROSE-UHFFFAOYSA-K; anhydride: InChI=1/Fe.H3N.2H2O4S/c;;2*1-5(2,3)4/h;1H3;2*(H2,1,2,3,4)/q+3;;;/p-3 Key: XGGLLRJQCZROSE-DFZHHIFOAY
- SMILES: anhydride: [Fe+3].[O-]S(=O)(=O)[O-].[O-]S([O-])(=O)=O.[NH4+]

Properties
| Chemical formula | FeNH_{4}(SO_{4})_{2}•12H_{2}O |
| Molar mass | 482.25 g/mol (dodecahydrate) |
| Appearance | Pale violet octahedral crystals |
| Odor | weak ammonia-like |
| Density | 1.71 g/cm^{3} |
| Melting point | 39 to 41 °C (102 to 106 °F; 312 to 314 K) |
| Solubility in water | 1240 g/L |

Hazards
- Occupational safety and health (OHS/OSH)
| Main hazards | Irritant |
- GHS labelling
| Pictograms | (GHS05: Corrosive) (GHS07: Exclamation mark) |
| Signal word | Danger |
| Hazard statements | H302, H315, H318, H335 |
| Precautionary statements | P261, P264, P264+P265, P270, P271, P280, P301+P317, P302+P352, P304+P340, P305+P354+P338, P317, P319, P321, P330, P332+P317, P362+P364, P403+P233, P405, P501 |
| NFPA 704 (fire diamond) | 1 0 0 |
| Threshold limit value (TLV) | 1.0 mg/m^{3}, as Fe |

Related compounds
| Other anions | Ammonium iron(III) citrate; Ammonium chloride |
| Other cations | Ammonium aluminium sulfate; potassium aluminium sulfate |
| Related compounds | Ammonium iron(II) sulfate |
- Except where otherwise noted, data are given for materials in their standard state (at 25 °C [77 °F], 100 kPa). verify (what is ?) Infobox references

Ammonium iron(III) sulfate, NH_{4}Fe(SO_{4})_{2}·12 H_{2}O, or NH_{4}[Fe(H_{2}O)_{6}](SO_{4})_{2}·6 H_{2}O, also known as ferric ammonium sulfate (FAS) or iron alum, is a double salt in the class of alums, which consists of compounds with the general formula AB(SO_{4})_{2} · 12 H_{2}O. It has the appearance of weakly violet, octahedrical crystals. There has been some discussion regarding the origin of the crystals' color, with some ascribing it to impurities in the compound, and others claiming it to be a property of the crystal itself.

FAS is paramagnetic, acidic and toxic towards microorganisms. It is a weak oxidizing agent, capable of being reduced to Mohr's salt, ferrous ammonium sulfate.

== Preparation ==
FAS can be prepared by crystallization from a solution of ferric sulfate and ammonium sulfate. Iron(II) in ferrous sulfate is oxidized to ferric sulfate by addition of sulfuric and nitric acid. Upon addition of ammonium sulfate to the solution and damping in of the solution, ferric ammonium sulfate crystals precipitate. Equations for these conversions ignore the degree of hydration of the material.

Oxidation: 6 FeSO_{4} + 2 HNO_{3} + 3 H_{2}SO_{4} → 3 Fe_{2}(SO_{4})_{3} + 2 NO + 4 H_{2}O

Synthesis: Fe_{2}(SO_{4})_{3} + (NH_{4})_{2}SO_{4} → 2 NH_{4}Fe(SO_{4})_{2}

== Uses ==
Areas of use for FAS include waste water treatment, tanning, production of dyestuffs, and as an etching agent in the production of electronic components. It has been used in a wide area of applications, including adiabatic refrigeration equipment, biochemical analysis, and organic synthesis.

== Gallery ==
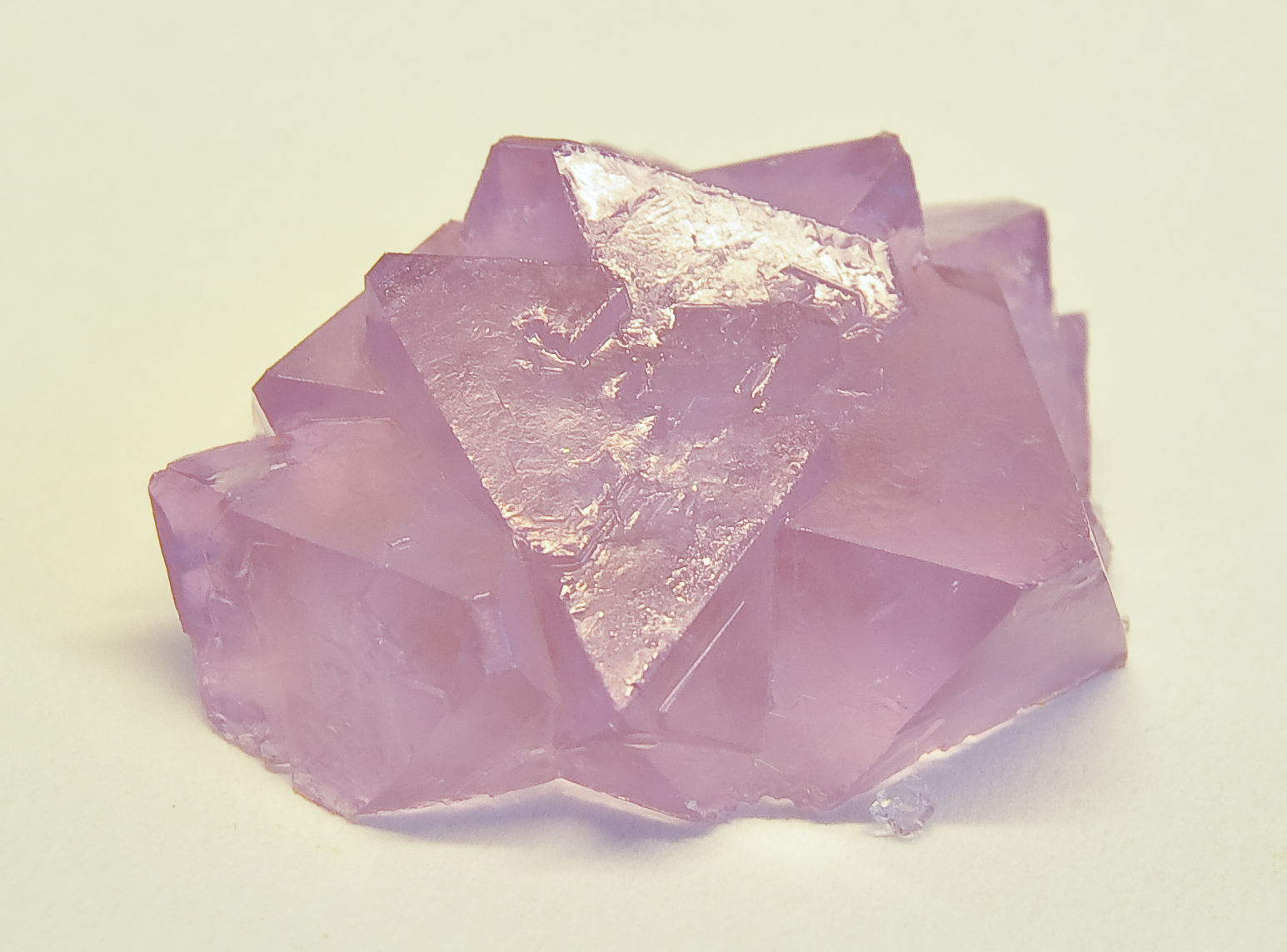
Crystals of ferric ammonium sulfate

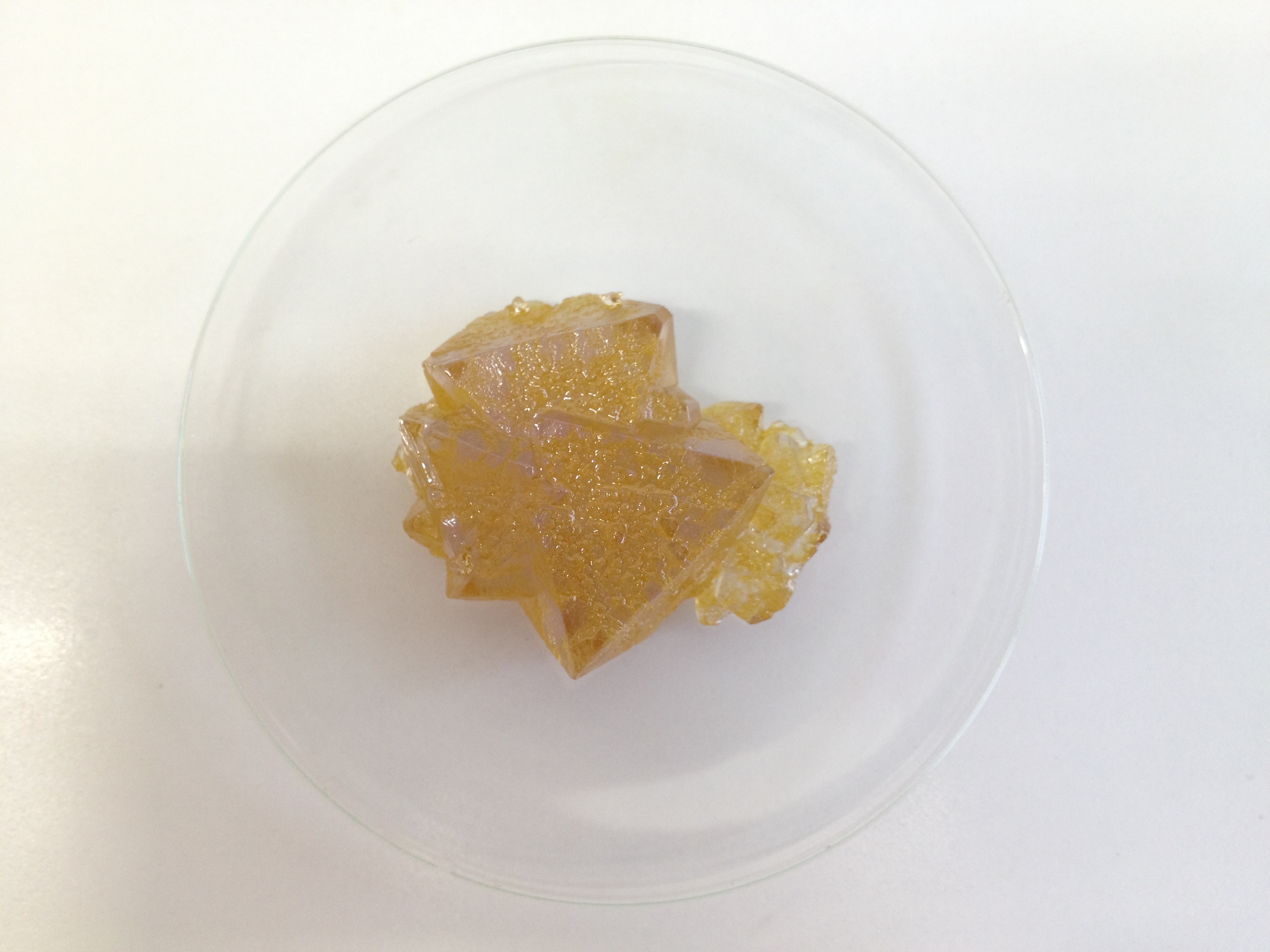
Crystals of ammonium iron(III) sulfate after 16 days in the air
