= Thallium(I) perchlorate =

Names
- IUPAC name Thallium(I) perchlorate
- Other names Thallous perchlorate

Identifiers
CAS Number	13453-40-2
3D model (JSmol)	Interactive image
ChemSpider	129952542
PubChem CID	22604687
- InChI: InChI=1S/ClHO4.Tl/c2-1(3,4)5;/h(H,2,3,4,5);/q;+1/p-1 Key: OWFNVXUZWJBPMP-UHFFFAOYSA-M
- SMILES: [O-]Cl(=O)(=O)=O.[Tl+]

Properties
Chemical formula	TlClO_{4}
Molar mass	303.83 g/mol
Appearance	Colorless crystals
Density	4.940 g/cm^{3} (25 °C, calculated)
Solubility in water	Soluble in water

Structure
Crystal structure	Orthorhombic (room temperature)
Space group	Pbnm (No. 62)
Lattice constant	a = 7.510 Å, b = 9.304 Å, c = 5.845 Å
Formula units (Z)	4
- Except where otherwise noted, data are given for materials in their standard state (at 25 °C [77 °F], 100 kPa). Infobox references

Thallium(I) perchlorate is an inorganic compound of thallium and perchloric acid with the formula TlClO_{4}. It is a colorless crystalline salt containing Tl^{+} and perchlorate ions. At room temperature it adopts an orthorhombic barite-type structure, but undergoes a solid-state phase transition to a cubic modification at approximately 266 °C.

== Preparation ==
Thallium(I) perchlorate can be prepared by neutralizing thallium(I) carbonate with perchloric acid:

Tl_{2}CO_{3} + 2HClO_{4} → 2TlClO_{4} + H_{2}O + CO_{2}

It can also be prepared by metathesis of aqueous thallium(I) sulfate and barium perchlorate. The insoluble barium sulfate is separated and the thallium(I) perchlorate purified by recrystallization.

Tl_{2}SO_{4} + Ba(ClO_{4})_{2} → 2TlClO_{4} + BaSO_{4} v

== Properties ==
=== Crystal structure ===
At room temperature, thallium(I) perchlorate crystallizes in the orthorhombic crystal system, space group Pbnm (No. 62), with four formula units per unit cell. X-ray diffraction measurements at 25 °C gave lattice parameters a = 7.510 Å, b = 9.304 Å and c = 5.845 Å, corresponding to a calculated density of 4.940 g cm^{−3}. The structure is isotypic with that of barite, BaSO_{4}.

The crystals are optically negative. Measurements on recrystallized material gave refractive indices n_{α} = 1.640, n_{β} = 1.644 and n_{γ} = 1.647 at room temperature.

=== Phase transitions ===
At approximately 539 K (266 °C), thallium(I) perchlorate undergoes a first-order structural phase transition from the orthorhombic form to a cubic high-temperature polymorph. The high-temperature form has space group F4̅3m, four formula units per unit cell and a lattice parameter of approximately 7.63 Å. This polymorph is related to the cubic high-temperature form of potassium perchlorate.

Infrared and Raman studies of single crystals show changes in the lattice-vibration spectrum across the transition. The low-temperature spectrum reflects distortion of the perchlorate ions from their ideal tetrahedral symmetry and interactions between the vibrational modes in the orthorhombic lattice, whereas the high-temperature phase has the greater symmetry of the cubic structure.

A separate high-pressure polymorph is also known. Pressure–temperature studies show a phase diagram similar to those of several alkali-metal perchlorates and tetrafluoroborates.

=== Thermal decomposition ===
On stronger heating, thallium(I) perchlorate decomposes exothermically. Thermal-analysis studies show decomposition in the region of approximately 400 °C and identify thallium(I) chloride and thallium(III) oxide among the solid products.

The decomposition is strongly affected by metal oxides. Heating thallium(I) perchlorate with chromium(III) oxide lowers its decomposition temperature and oxidizes chromium from the +3 to the +6 oxidation state, producing thallium(I) dichromate.

2TlClO_{4} + Cr_{2}O_{3} → Tl_{2}Cr_{2}O_{7} + Cl_{2} + 2O_{2}

The products of this reaction have been identified by chemical analysis, X-ray diffraction and infrared spectroscopy.
