= Tetrafluoroberyllate =

Anion

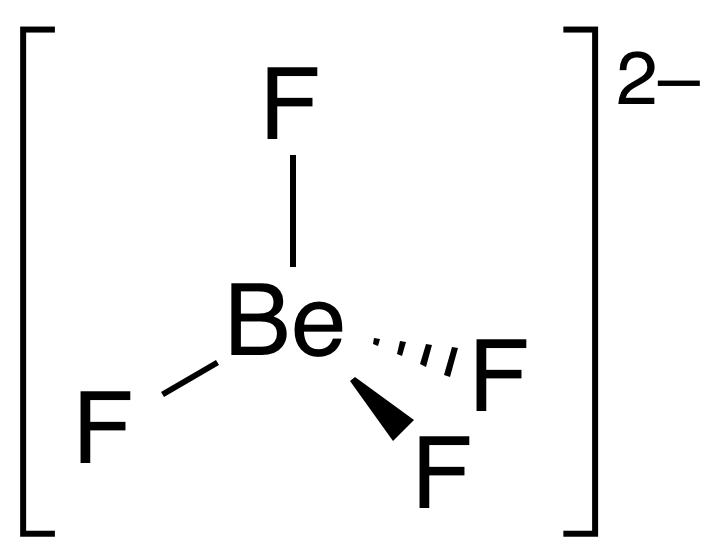

Names
- IUPAC name Tetrafluoroberyllate(2−)
- Systematic IUPAC name Tetrafluoroberyllate(2−)
- Other names Tetrafluoroberyllate

Identifiers
CAS Number	18539-20-3
3D model (JSmol)	: Interactive image; : Interactive image
ChEBI	CHEBI:30497
ChemSpider	15238330
Gmelin Reference	2035
PubChem CID	5834288
UNII	NL2E2HZ73G
- InChI: InChI=1S/Be.4FH/h;4*1H/q+2;;;;/p-4 Key: UUMYFIKVCFICLB-UHFFFAOYSA-J; InChI=1S/Be.4FH/h;4*1H/q+2;;;;/p-4 Key: UUMYFIKVCFICLB-UHFFFAOYSA-J
- SMILES: : [Be-2](F)(F)(F)F; : F[Be--](F)(F)F

Properties
Chemical formula	[BeF_{4}]^{2−}
Molar mass	85.0057958 g·mol^{−1}

Structure
Point group	T_{d}
Molecular shape	tetrahedral

Related compounds
Related isoelectronic	Tetrafluoroborate [BF_{4}]^{−}; Tetrafluoromethane CF_{4}; Tetrafluoroammonium [NF_{4}]^{+}
- Except where otherwise noted, data are given for materials in their standard state (at 25 °C [77 °F], 100 kPa). Infobox references

Tetrafluoroberyllate or orthofluoroberyllate is an anion with the chemical formula [BeF_{4}]^{2−}. It contains beryllium and fluorine. This fluoroanion has a tetrahedral shape, with the four fluorine atoms surrounding a central beryllium atom. It has the same size, charge, and outer electron structure as sulfate SO^{2−}_{4}. Therefore, many compounds that contain sulfate have equivalents with tetrafluoroberyllate. Examples of these are the langbeinites, and Tutton's salts.

== Properties ==
The Be–F bond length is between 145 and 153 pm. The beryllium is sp^{3} hybridized, leading to a longer bond than in BeF_{2}, where beryllium is sp hybridized. In trifluoroberyllates, there are actually BeF_{4} tetrahedra arranged in a triangle, so that three fluorine atoms are shared on two tetrahedra each, resulting in a formula of Be_{3}F_{9}.

In the tetrafluoroberyllates, the tetrahedra can rotate to various degrees. At room temperature, they are hindered from moving. But as temperature increases, they can rotate around the threefold axis, (i.e. a line through one fluorine atom and the beryllium atom) with a potential barrier of 12.5 kcal/mol (52 kJ/mol). At higher temperatures, the movement can become isotropic (not limited to rotation on one axis) with a potential barrier of 14.5 kcal/mol (61 kJ/mol).

Similar compounds have magnesium or zinc in a similar position as beryllium, e.g. K_{2}[MgF_{4}] (potassium tetrafluoromagnesate) or [NH_{4}]_{2}[ZnF_{4}] (ammonium tetrafluorozincate) but these are not as stable.

Tetrafluoroberyllate has a biological effect by inhibiting F-ATPase adenosine triphosphate producing enzymes in mitochondria and bacteria. It does this by attempting to react with adenosine diphosphate because it resembles phosphate. However once it does this it remains stuck in the F1 part of the enzyme and inhibits it from further function.

== Simple salts ==
Name	Chemical formula	Molar mass (g/mol)	CAS number	Crystal system	Density (g/cm^{3})	Melting point (°C)	Solubility in water (g/(100 ml))
lithium tetrafluoroberyllate	Li_{2}[BeF_{4}]	98.89			2.167	472 °C	slight (1.25 at 20 °C, 5.78 at 40 °C)
sodium tetrafluoroberyllate	Na_{2}BeF_{4}	130.985333	13871-27-7	Orthorhombic	2.47	575 °C	slight (1.33 at 0 °C, 1.44 at 20 °C, 2.73 at 90 °C)
potassium tetrafluoroberyllate	K_{2}BeF_{4}	163.20	7787-50-0	orthorhombic a = 5.691 Å, b = 7.278 Å, c = 9.896 Å as for strontium orthosilicate	2.64		
potassium tetrafluoroberyllate dihydrate	K_{2}BeF_{4}·2H_{2}O	199.233					
ammonium tetrafluoroberyllate	(NH_{4})_{2}BeF_{4}	121.0827	14874-86-3	orthorhombic a = 5.91 Å, b = 7.64 Å, c = 10.43 Å	1.71	decomposes 280 °C	32.3 at 25 °C
rubidium tetrafluoroberyllate	Rb_{2}BeF_{4}	255.941		orthorhombic a = 5.87 Å, b = 7.649 Å, c = 10.184 Å	3.72		
caesium tetrafluoroberyllate	Cs_{2}BeF_{4}	350.8167		orthorhomic a = 8.03 Å, b = 10.81 Å, c = 0.622 Å	4.32		
thallium tetrafluoroberyllate	Tl_{2}BeF_{4}	493.7724		orthorhombic a = 7.7238 Å, b = 5.9022 Å, c = 10.4499 Å	6.884		
silver tetrafluoroberyllate	Ag_{2}BeF_{4}	300.7422					
magnesium tetrafluoroberyllate	MgBeF_{4}	109.3108					
calcium tetrafluoroberyllate	CaBeF_{4}	125.08			2.959		
strontium tetrafluoroberyllate	SrBeF_{4}	172.6		orthorhombic a = 5.291 Å, b = 6.787 Å, c = 8.307 Å	3.84		insoluble
barium tetrafluoroberyllate	BaBeF_{4}	222.333			4.17		insoluble
radium tetrafluoroberyllate	RaBeF_{4}	311.005795					insoluble
hexaqua ferrous tetrafluoroberyllate	FeBeF_{4}·6H_{2}O						
heptaqua ferrous tetrafluoroberyllate	FeBeF_{4}·7H_{2}O				1.894		
heptaqua nickel tetrafluoroberyllate	NiBeF_{4}·7H_{2}O						
hexaqua nickel tetrafluoroberyllate	NiBeF_{4}·6H_{2}O						
heptaqua cobalt tetrafluoroberyllate	CoBeF_{4}·7H_{2}O				1.867		
hexaqua cobalt tetrafluoroberyllate	CoBeF_{4}·6H_{2}O				1.891		
pentaqua copper tetrafluoroberyllate	CuBeF_{4}·5H_{2}O						
diaqua triethanolamine copper tetrafluoroberyllate hydrate	[Cu(tea)(H_{2}O)_{2}](BeF_{4})⋅H_{2}O			orthorhombic a = 12.3858 Å, b = 14.8016 Å, c = 15.0535 Å, V = 2759.75			
heptaqua zinc tetrafluoroberyllate	ZnBeFe_{4}·7H_{2}O						
lead tetrafluoroberyllate	PbBeF_{4}	292.2			6.135		
hydrazinium tetrafluoroberyllate	N_{2}H_{6}BeF_{4}	119.0668		a = 5.58 Å, b = 7.337 Å, c = 9.928 Å, α = 90°, β = 98.22°, γ = 90°			
triglycine tetrafluoroberyllate	(NH_{2}CH_{2}COOH)_{3}·H_{2}BeF_{4}	312.221	2396-72-7	monoclinic			
ethylene diamine fluoroberyllate	(NH_{2}CH_{2}CH_{2}NH_{2})·H_{2}BeF_{4}					decomposes 330 °C	
propylenediamine tetrafluoroberyllate	(NH_{2}CH_{2}CH_{2}CH_{2}NH_{2})·H_{2}BeF_{4}						
propylene-1,2-diamine tetrafluoroberyllate	(NH_{2}CH(CH_{3})CH_{2}NH_{2})·H_{2}BeF_{4}			monoclinic a = 5.535 Å, b = 13.560 Å, c = 9.6048 Å, β = 106.73 Å, V = 690.4 Å^{3}, Z = 4	1.55		
benzidine fluoroberyllate	(NH_{2}C_{6}H_{4}C_{6}H_{4}NH_{2})·H_{2}BeF_{4}						ins
tetramethyl ammonium tetrafluoroberyllate	[N(CH_{3})_{4}]_{2}BeF_{4}						
tetramine silver tetrafluoroberyllate	[Ag(NH_{3})_{2}]_{2}BeF_{4}						
	[Cu(NH_{3})_{2}]_{2}BeF_{4}						
	[Cu(NH_{3})_{4}]_{2}BeF_{4}·H_{2}O						
	[Zn(NH_{3})_{4}]_{2}BeF_{4}						
	[Cd(NH_{3})_{4}]_{2}BeF_{4}						
	[Ni(NH_{3})_{6}]_{2}BeF_{4}						
	[Ni(NH_{3})_{4}]_{2}BeF_{4}·2H_{2}O						
	[Ni(NH_{3})_{2}]_{2}BeF_{4}						
	[Co(NH_{3})_{6}]_{2}BeF_{4}·3H_{2}O						

Sodium tetrafluoroberyllate has several crystalline forms. Below 220 °C it takes the same form as orthorhombic olivine, and this is called γ phase. Between 220 °C and 320 °C it is in the α′ form. When temperature is raised above 320 °C it changes to the hexagonal α form. When cooled the α′ form changes to β form at 110 °C and this can be cooled to 70 °C before changing back to the γ form. It can be formed by melting sodium fluoride and beryllium fluoride. The gas above molten sodium tetrafluoroberyllate contains BeF_{2} and NaF gas.

Lithium tetrafluoroberyllate takes on the same crystal form as the mineral phenacite. As a liquid it is proposed for the molten salt reactor, in which it is called FLiBe. The liquid salt has a high specific heat, similar to that of water. The molten salt has a very similar density to the solid. The solid has continuous void channels through it, which reduces its density. Li_{2}BeF_{4} can be crystallised from aqueous solution using (NH_{4})_{2}BeF_{4} and LiCl.

Potassium tetrafluoroberyllate has the same structure as anhydrous potassium sulfate, as does rubidium and caesium tetrafluoroberyllate. Potassium tetrafluoroberyllate can make solid solutions with potassium sulfate. It can be used as a starting point to make the non-linear optic crystal KBe_{2}BO_{3}F_{2} which has the highest power handling capacity and shortest UV performance of any borate. It is quite soluble in water, so beryllium can be extracted from soil in this form.

Ammonium tetrafluoroberyllate decomposes on heating by losing NH_{4}F vapour, progressively forming NH_{4}BeF_{3}, then NH_{4}Be_{2}F_{5} and finally BeF_{2}.

Thallium tetrafluoroberyllate can be made by dissolving beryllium fluoride and thallium carbonate together in hydrofluoric acid and then evaporating the solution.

Radium tetrafluoroberyllate is used as a standard neutron source. The alpha particles from the radium cause neutrons to be emitted from the beryllium. It is precipitated from a radium chloride solution mixed with potassium tetrafluoroberyllate.

Magnesium tetrafluoroberyllate can be precipitated from a hot saturated solution of ammonium tetrafluoroberyllate and a magnesium salt. However, if the temperature reaches boiling point MgF_{2} is precipitated instead.

Calcium tetrafluoroberyllate resembles zircon in the way it melts and crystallises.

Strontium tetrafluoroberyllate can be made in several forms. The γ form is produced by cooling a melt of SrF_{2} and Be_{2} and the β form is made by precipitating from a water solution. When melted and heated to 850–1145 °C, Be_{2} gas evaporates leaving behind molten SrF_{2}.

The barium tetrafluoroberyllate is very insoluble and can be used for gravimetric analysis of beryllium.

H_{2}BeF_{4} is an acid that can be produced from Ag_{2}BeF_{4} and HCl. It only exists in aqueous solution.

Triglycine tetrafluoroberyllate (TGFB) is ferroelectric with a transition point of 70 °C. The crystals can be formed by dissolving BeF_{2} in water, adding HF and then glycine. When the solution is cooled triglycine tetrafluoroberyllate forms. Cs_{2}BeF_{4} and Tl_{2}BeF_{4} in the solution reduce growth on the 001 direction so that tabular shaped crystals of TGFB form. The thallium compound can cut growth on the 001 axis by 99%.

== Double salts ==
=== Tuttons salts ===
The Tuttons salt (NH_{4})_{2}Mn(BeF_{4})_{2}·6(H_{2}O) is made from a solution of NH_{4}BeF_{3} mixed with NH_{4}MnF_{3}. The equivalent of alums are hard to make because the trivalent ion will often form a complex with fluoride in preference to the beryllium fluoride. However the violet coloured acid and rubidium chrome alum exist at chilly temperatures for a few hours.

Tutton's salts (also called schoenites) containing magnesium with fluoroberyllate are difficult to produce, as the solutions tend to precipitate insoluble MgF_{2}.

name	formula	molecular weight	CAS	crystal form	density	melting point	solubility g/100ml
potassium lithium tetrafluoroberyllate	KLiBeF_{4}	131.05		P6_{3}, a = 8.781 Å, b = 5.070 Å c = 8.566 Å			
rubidium lithium tetrafluoroberyllate	RbLiBeF_{4}	177.41		P6_{3}22, a = 8.980 Å, b = 5.185 Å c = 8.751 Å			
caesium lithium tetrafluoroberyllate	CsLiBeF_{4}	224.852		P2_{1}/n, a = 9.328 Å b = 5.356 Å, c = 8.736 Å, γ = 89.82°			
acid chromium fluoroberyllate tetracosihydrate	H_{2}Cr_{2}(BeF_{4})_{4}·24H_{2}O	878.40					
ammonium chromium fluoroberyllate tetracosihydrate	(NH_{4})_{2}Cr_{2}(BeF_{4})_{4}·24H_{2}O	912.46					
rubidium chromium fluoroberyllate tetracosihydrate	Rb_{2}Cr_{2}(BeF_{4})_{4}·24H_{2}O	1047.32					
manganese ammonium fluoroberyllate hydrate	(NH_{4})_{2}Mn(BeF_{4})_{2}·6H_{2}O	369.118			1.758		
	Rb_{2}Fe(BeF_{4})_{2}·6H_{2}O	504.884					
ferrous ammonium fluoroberyllate hydrate	(NH_{4})_{2}Fe(BeF_{4})_{2}·6H_{2}O	370.025					
nickel potassium fluoroberyllate hydrate	K_{2}Ni(BeF_{4})_{2}·6H_{2}O	414.913					
nickel rubidium fluoroberyllate hydrate	Rb_{2}Ni(BeF_{4})_{2}·6H_{2}O	507.732					
	Cs_{2}Ni(BeF_{4})_{2}·6H_{2}O	602.608					
nickel ammonium fluoroberyllate hydrate	(NH_{4})_{2}Ni(BeF_{4})_{2}·6H_{2}O	372.874		P2_{1}/a, a = 9.201 Å, b = 12.482 Å, c = 6.142 Å, β = 106.57 Å, V = 676.0 Å^{3} Z = 2	1.843		
cobalt potassium fluoroberyllate hydrate	K_{2}Co(BeF_{4})_{2}·6H_{2}O	415.233					
cobalt rubidium fluoroberyllate hydrate	Rb_{2}Co(BeF_{4})_{2}·6H_{2}O	507.972					
cobalt ammonium fluoroberyllate hydrate	(NH_{4})_{2}Co(BeF_{4})_{2}·6H_{2}O	372.874			1.821		
copper rubidium fluoroberyllate hydrate	Rb_{2}Cu(BeF_{4})_{2}·6H_{2}O	512.585					
copper ammonium fluoroberyllate hydrate	(NH_{4})_{2}Cu(BeF_{4})_{2}·6H_{2}O	377.726			1.858		
zinc rubidium fluoroberyllate hydrate	Rb_{2}Zn(BeF_{4})_{2}·6H_{2}O	514.42					
zinc ammonium fluoroberyllate hydrate	(NH_{4})_{2}Zn(BeF_{4})_{2}·6H_{2}O	379.56			1.859		
cadmium rubidium fluoroberyllate hydrate	Rb_{2}Cd(BeF_{4})_{2}·6H_{2}O	561.45					
cadmium ammonium fluoroberyllate hydrate	(NH_{4})_{2}Cd(BeF_{4})_{2}·6H_{2}O	426.591					

=== Alums ===
Tetrafluoroberyllate salts equivalent to alums also exist with formula MABF_{4}·12H_{2}O, where M is univalent, and A trivalent. These are not common as fluoride often form insoluble products with the trivalent ions. Methods to produce these include evaporating mixed fluoride solutions under reduced pressure at 0 °C, or dissolving beryllium and other metal hydroxides in hydrofluoric acid at room temperature, cooled, and them mixing with cold ethyl alcohol, causing cooling and crystallisation. The unit cell dimensions are slightly smaller (by 0.03–0.05 Å) than the corresponding sulfate alums.

name	formula	molecular weight	CAS	crystal form	density	melting point	solubility g/100ml
ammonium aluminium tetrafluoroberyllate alum	NH_{4}AlBeF_{4}·12H_{2}O						
potassium aluminium tetrafluoroberyllate alum	KAlBeF_{4}·12H_{2}O						
potassium chromium tetrafluoroberyllate alum	KCrBeF_{4}·12H_{2}O						
ammonium chromium tetrafluoroberyllate alum	NH_{4}CrBeF_{4}·12H_{2}O			cubic a = 12.218 Å, Z = 4			
rubidium chromium tetrafluoroberyllate alum	RbCrBeF_{4}·12H_{2}O			12.214 Å			
caesium chromium tetrafluoroberyllate alum	CsCrBeF_{4}·12H_{2}O			12.323 Å			
thallium chromium tetrafluoroberyllate alum	TlCrBeF_{4}·12H_{2}O			12.195 Å			
rubidium iron tetrafluoroberyllate alum	RbFeBeF_{4}·12H_{2}O						
caesium iron tetrafluoroberyllate alum	CsFeBeF_{4}·12H_{2}O						
monomethyl chromium tetrafluoroberyllate alum	CH_{3}NH_{3}CrBeF_{4}·12H_{2}O			12.496 Å			
guanidium chromium tetrafluoroberyllate alum	C(NH_{2})_{3}CrBeF_{4}·12H_{2}O			12.538 Å		on heating forms a rhombohedral hexahydrate stable from 30 °C to 90 °C	
