= Iron(III) sulfate =

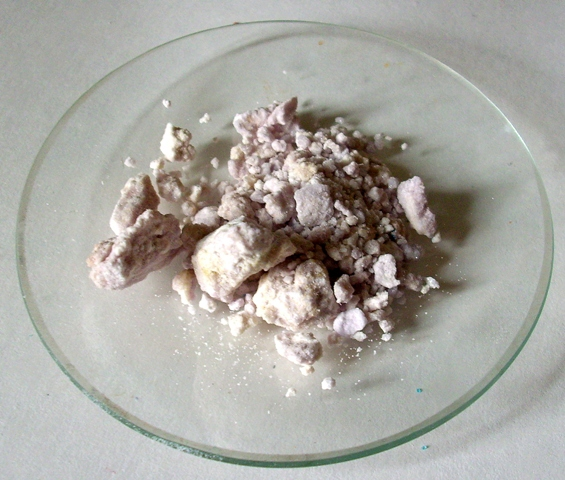
- Iron(III) sulfate

Names
- IUPAC name Iron(III) sulfate
- Other names Ferric sulfate

Identifiers
CAS Number	10028-22-5
3D model (JSmol)	Interactive image
ChEBI	CHEBI:53438
ChemSpider	23211
ECHA InfoCard	100.030.054
PubChem CID	24826
RTECS number	NO8505000
UNII	4YKQ1X5E5Y
CompTox Dashboard (EPA)	DTXSID5029712
- InChI: InChI=1S/2Fe.3H2O4S/c;;3*1-5(2,3)4/h;;3*(H2,1,2,3,4)/q2*+3;;;/p-6 Key: RUTXIHLAWFEWGM-UHFFFAOYSA-H; InChI=1/2Fe.3H2O4S/c;;3*1-5(2,3)4/h;;3*(H2,1,2,3,4)/q2*+3;;;/p-6 Key: RUTXIHLAWFEWGM-CYFPFDDLAR
- SMILES: [Fe+3].[Fe+3].[O-]S(=O)(=O)[O-].[O-]S([O-])(=O)=O.[O-]S([O-])(=O)=O

Properties
Chemical formula	Fe_{2}(SO_{4})_{3}
Molar mass	399.88 g/mol (anhydrous); 489.96 g/mol (pentahydrate); 562.00 g/mol (nonahydrate)
Appearance	grayish-white crystals
Density	3.097 g/cm^{3} (anhydrous); 1.898 g/cm^{3} (pentahydrate)
Melting point	480 °C (896 °F; 753 K) (anhydrous)(decomposes); 175 °C (347 °F) (nonahydrate)
Solubility in water	256 g/L (monohydrate, 293 K)
Solubility	sparingly soluble in alcohol negligible in acetone, ethyl acetate insoluble in sulfuric acid, ammonia
Refractive index (n_{D})	1.814 (anhydrous); 1.552 (nonahydrate)

Hazards
- GHS labelling
Pictograms	(GHS05: Corrosive) (GHS07: Exclamation mark)
Signal word	Danger
Hazard statements	H290, H302, H315, H317, H318, H319, H335
Precautionary statements	P234, P261, P264, P264+P265, P270, P271, P272, P280, P301+P317, P302+P352, P304+P340, P305+P351+P338, P305+P354+P338, P317, P319, P321, P330, P333+P317, P337+P317, P362+P364, P390, P403+P233, P405, P501
NFPA 704 (fire diamond)	1 0 0
- Lethal dose or concentration (LD, LC)
LD_{50} (median dose)	500 mg/kg (oral, rat)
- NIOSH (US health exposure limits)
REL (Recommended)	TWA 1 mg/m^{3}

Related compounds
Other anions	Iron(III) chloride Iron(III) nitrate
Related compounds	Iron(II) sulfate; Ammonium iron(II) sulfate; Ammonium iron(III) sulfate
- Except where otherwise noted, data are given for materials in their standard state (at 25 °C [77 °F], 100 kPa). verify (what is ?) Infobox references

Iron(III) sulfate or ferric sulfate is a family of inorganic compounds with the formula Fe_{2}(SO_{4})_{3}(H_{2}O)_{n}. A variety of hydrates are known, including the most commonly encountered form of "ferric sulfate". Solutions are used in dyeing as a mordant and as a coagulant for industrial wastes. Solutions of ferric sulfate are also used in the processing of aluminum and steel.

== Speciation ==
The various crystalline forms of Fe_{2}(SO_{4})_{3}(H_{2}O)_{n} are well-defined, often by X-ray crystallography. The nature of the aqueous solutions is often less certain, but aquo-hydroxo complexes such as [Fe(H_{2}O)_{6}]^{3+} and [Fe(H_{2}O)_{5}(OH)]^{2+} are often assumed. Regardless, all such solids and solutions feature ferric ions, each with five unpaired electrons. By virtue of this high-spin d^{5} electronic configuration, these ions are paramagnetic and are weak chromophores.

== Production ==
Ferric sulfate solutions are usually generated from iron wastes. The actual identity of the iron species is often vague, but many applications do not demand high-purity materials. It is produced on a large scale by treating sulfuric acid, a hot solution of ferrous sulfate, and an oxidizing agent. Typical oxidizing agents include chlorine, nitric acid, and hydrogen peroxide.

2 FeSO_{4} + H_{2}SO_{4} + H_{2}O_{2} → Fe_{2}(SO_{4})_{3} + 2 H_{2}O

== Natural occurrences ==
Iron sulfates occur as a variety of rare commercially unimportant minerals. The mineralogical form of iron(III) sulfate, mikasaite, is a mixed iron-aluminium sulfate with the chemical formula (Fe^{3+}, Al^{3+})_{2}(SO_{4})_{3}. This anhydrous form occurs very rarely and is connected with coal fires. The hydrates are more common, with coquimbite (nonahydrate) as probably the most often met among them. Paracoquimbite is the other, rarely encountered natural nonahydrate. Kornelite (heptahydrate) and quenstedtite (decahydrate) are rarely found. Andradite garnet is a yellow-green example found in Italy. Lausenite (hexa- or pentahydrate) is a doubtful species. All the mentioned natural hydrates are unstable connected with the weathering (aerobic oxidation) of Fe-bearing primary minerals (mainly pyrite and marcasite).

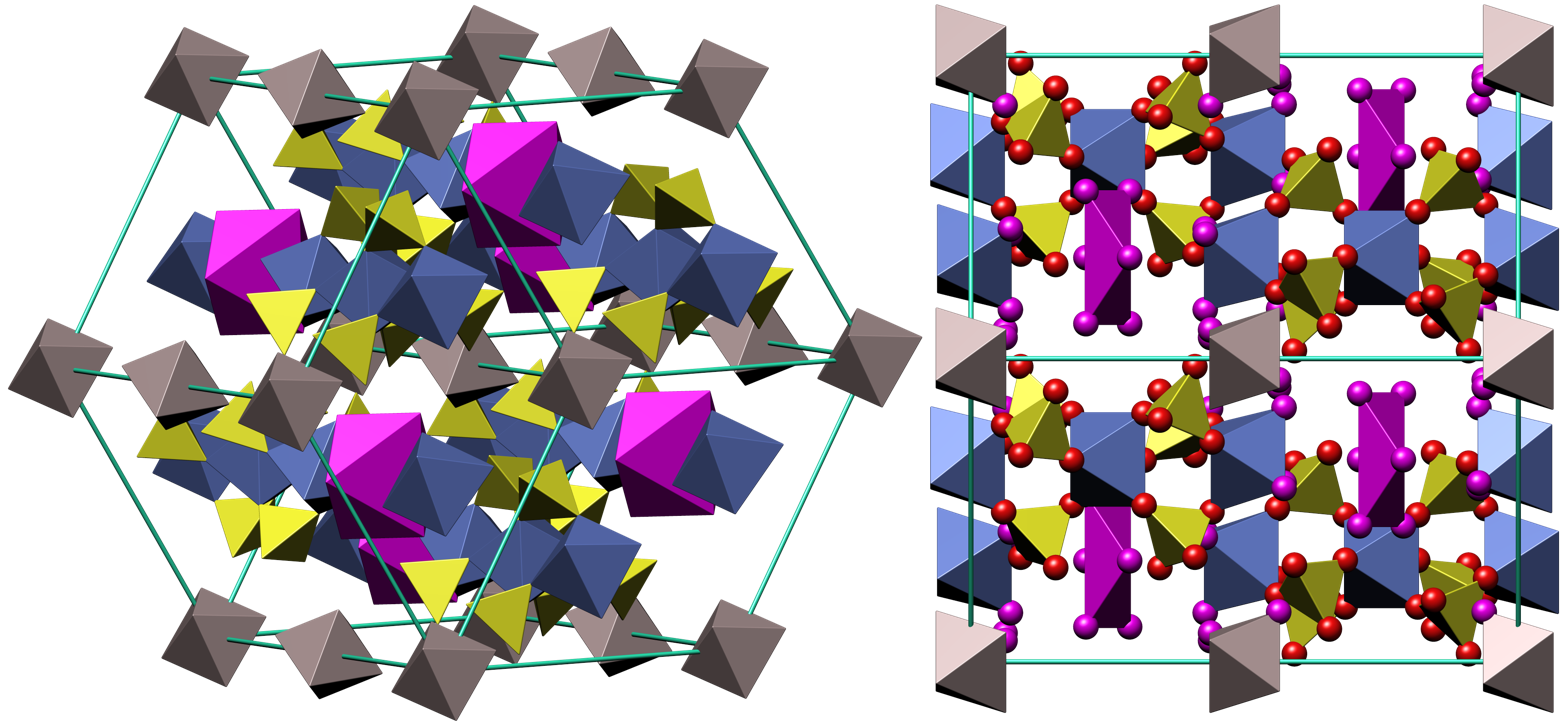
Coquimbite crystal structure
