= Millosevichite =

Rare sulfate mineral

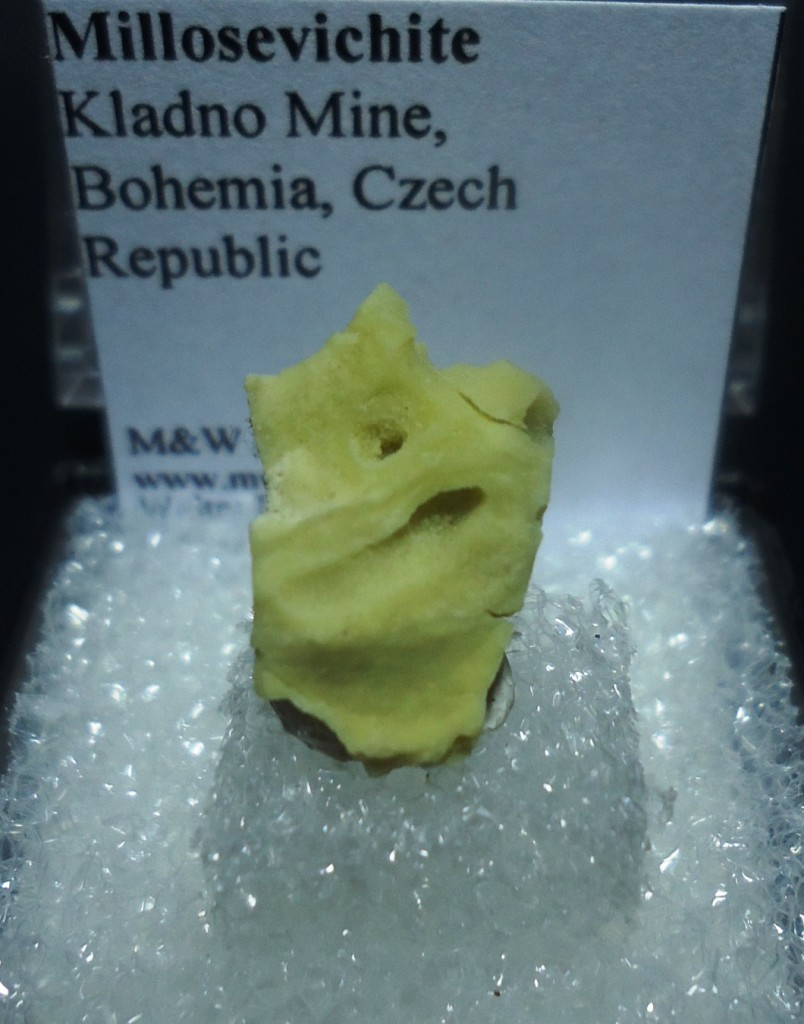
- Porous yellow millosevichite. Dimensions: 14 mm × 10 mm × 8 mm. Locality: Kladno Mine (Nejedlý I Mine; Zdeněk Nejedlý Mine; Schoeller Mine; Schöller Mine), Libušin, Kladno, Central Bohemia Region, Bohemia (Böhmen; Boehmen), Czech Republic.

General
- Category: Sulfate mineral
- Formula: Al_{2}(SO_{4})_{3}
- IMA symbol: Msv
- Strunz classification: 7.AB.05
- Crystal system: Trigonal
- Crystal class: Rhombohedral (3̅); H-M symbol: (3̅)
- Space group: R3̅
- Unit cell: a = 8.05 Å, c = 21.19 Å; Z = 6

Identification
- Color: Indigo, bright red, brick-red
- Crystal habit: Granular aggregates of minute crystals; stalactitic porous masses
- Mohs scale hardness: 1.5
- Luster: Vitreous
- Diaphaneity: Semitransparent
- Specific gravity: 1.72 measured
- Optical properties: Uniaxial (+)
- Refractive index: n_{ω} = 1.500 n_{ε} = 1.515
- Birefringence: δ = 0.015
- Other characteristics: Hygroscopic

Millosevichite is a rare sulfate mineral with the chemical formula Al_{2}(SO_{4})_{3}. Aluminium is often substituted by iron. It forms finely crystalline and often porous masses.

It was first described in 1913 for an occurrence in Grotta dell'Allume, Porto Levante, Vulcano Island, Lipari, Aeolian Islands, Sicily. It was named for Italian mineralogist Federico Millosevich (1875–1942) of the University of Rome.

The mineral is mainly known from burning coal dumps, acting as one of the main minerals forming sulfate crust. It can be also found in volcanic fumeroles (solfatara environments). It occurs with native sulfur, sal ammoniac, letovicite, alunogen and boussingaultite.
