= Sulfate crust =

Zone in parts of burning coal dumps

Sulfate crust is a zone observed in the axial (central) parts of burning coal dumps and related sites. It is a zone built mainly by anhydrous sulfate minerals, such as godovikovite and millosevichite. The outer zone can easily be hydrated giving rise to minerals like tschermigite and alunogen. The zone forms due to interaction with hot (even around 600 °C) coal-derived gases (mainly NH_{3} and SO_{3}) with the "sterile" material (i.e. shales and other rocks serving as the source of Al^{3+}, Fe^{3+}, Ca^{2+} and other cations) in case of the lack of vents for the gases to escape into the atmosphere.

== See also ==
- Coal seam fire
- Coal underground fires
