= Double salt =

Type of salt

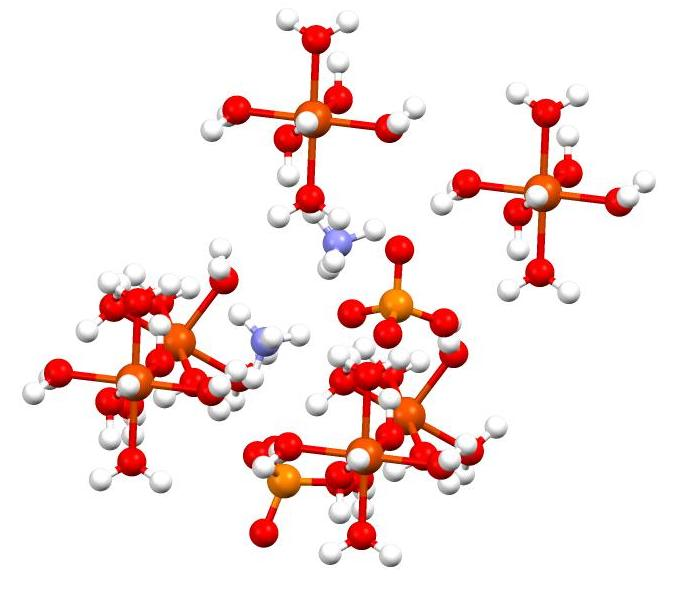
Unit cell of the double salt ferrous ammonium sulfate (Mohr's salt or Mohrite). Color code: N is violet, O is red, S is orange, Fe is large red.

A double salt is a salt that contains two distinct cations or two distinct anions. More specifically, the two cations (or anions) are not statistically distributed. Many examples are known. Double salts only exist in the solid state. For those that can be dissolved in water, they completely dissociate into simple ions. They have no characteristic appearance.

== Examples ==
Examples of double salts with two cations

formula	cation A	cation B	anion	Comment
MM'(SO_{4})_{2}·12H_{2}O (alums)	[M(H_{2}O)_{6}]^{+}	[M'(H_{2}O)_{6}]^{3+}	SO^{2−}_{4}	many examples
BaCa(CO_{3})_{2} (mineral bromlite)	Ba^{2+}	Ca^{2+}	CO^{2−}_{3}	Although called a salt, it is insoluble in water
potassium sodium tartrate	Na^{+}	K^{+}	(CH(OH))_{2}(CO^{−}_{2})_{2}	rare mixed Na-K salt
[NH_{4}]_{2}[Fe(H_{2}O)_{6}](SO_{4})_{2} (Mohr's salt)	[NH_{4}]^{+}	[Fe(H_{2}O)_{6}]^{2+}	SO^{2−}_{4}	one of the Tutton's salts
K_{2}Na[Co(NO_{2})_{6}]·H_{2}O	K^{+}	Na^{+}	[Co(NO_{2})_{6}]^{3−}	Sodium cobaltinitrite (Na_{3}[Co(NO_{2})_{6}]) is highly soluble but NaK_{2}[Co(NO_{2})_{6}] is not.

Examples of double salts with two anions

formula	cation	anion A	anion B	Comment
Pb_{2}(CO_{3})Cl_{2} (mineral Phosgenite)	Pb^{2+}	Cl^{−}	CO^{2−}_{3}	Although called a salt, it is insoluble in water
(NH_{4})_{3}PO_{4}^{.}(NH_{4})_{2}HPO_{4}	NH_{4}^{+}	PO^{3−}_{4}	HPO^{2−}_{4}	one of several ammonium phosphates
K_{5}(HSO_{3})_{3}(S_{2}O_{5})	K^{+}	HSO^{−}_{3}	S_{2}O^{2−}_{5}	A rare crystalline bisulfite (HSO_{3}^{-}).

== Counter examples ==
Many coordination complexes could be viewed as double salts, but they usually are not. Species like sodium ferrocyanide Na_{4}[Fe(CN)_{6}] are not classified as double salts. It contain the discrete hexacyanoferrate(II) ion [Fe(CN)_{6}]^{4−}. Thus, it is simply a 4:1 salt. It is nontoxic by virtue of the fact that [Fe(CN)_{6}]^{4−} remains intact in solution, vs. releasing free and highly toxic cyanide. In many cases, the complex ion is indicated by square brackets "[ ]".

Double salts are distinct from mixed-crystal systems where two salts cocrystallise; the former involves a chemical combination with fixed composition, whereas the latter is a mixture.

== Triple salts ==
An example of a triple salt is Oxone, which is a widely used disinfectant. With the formula 2KHSO_{5}·KHSO_{4}·K_{2}SO_{4}, Oxone features three distinct anions: HSO^{−}_{5}, HSO^{−}_{4}, and SO^{2−}_{4}. X-ray crystallography confirms the triple salt formulation, revealing hydrogen-bonding network that entraps the persulfate anion. The active ingredient in Oxone, KHSO_{5} or potassium peroxysulfate, is less stable than the triple salt.
