= Tutton's salt =

Class of chemical compounds

Tutton's salts are a family of salts with the formula M_{2}M'(SO_{4})_{2}(H_{2}O)_{6} (sulfates) or M_{2}M'(SeO_{4})_{2}(H_{2}O)_{6} (selenates). These materials are double salts, which means that they contain two different cations, M^{+} and M'^{2+} crystallized in the same regular ionic lattice. The univalent cation can be potassium, rubidium, caesium, ammonium (NH_{4}), deuterated ammonium (ND_{4}) or thallium. Sodium or lithium ions are too small. The divalent cation can be magnesium, vanadium, chromium, manganese, iron, cobalt, nickel, copper, zinc or cadmium. In addition to sulfate and selenate, the divalent anion can be chromate (CrO_{4}^{2−}), tetrafluoroberyllate (BeF_{4}^{2−}), hydrogenphosphate (HPO_{4}^{2−}) or monofluorophosphate (PO_{3}F^{2−}). Tutton's salts crystallize in the monoclinic space group P2_{1}/a. The robustness is the result of the complementary hydrogen-bonding between the tetrahedral anions and cations as well their interactions with the metal aquo complex [M(H_{2}O)_{6}]^{2+}.

== Examples and related compounds ==
Perhaps the best-known is Mohr's salt, ferrous ammonium sulfate (NH_{4})_{2}Fe(SO_{4})_{2}^{.}(H_{2}O)_{6}). Other examples include the vanadous Tutton salt (NH_{4})_{2}V(SO_{4})_{2}(H_{2}O)_{6} and the chromous Tutton salt (NH_{4})_{2}Cr(SO_{4})_{2}(H_{2}O)_{6}. In solids and solutions, the M'^{2+} ion exists as a metal aquo complex [M'(H_{2}O)_{6}]^{2+}.

Related to the Tutton's salts are the alums, which are also double salts but with the formula MM'(SO_{4})_{2}(H_{2}O)_{12}. The Tutton's salts were once termed "false alums".

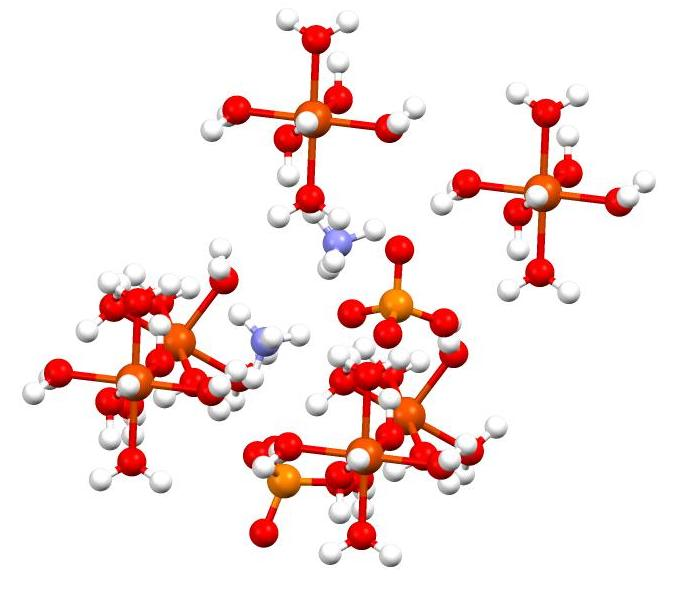
Unit cell of ferrous ammonium sulfate (N is violet, O is red, S is orange, Fe is large red).

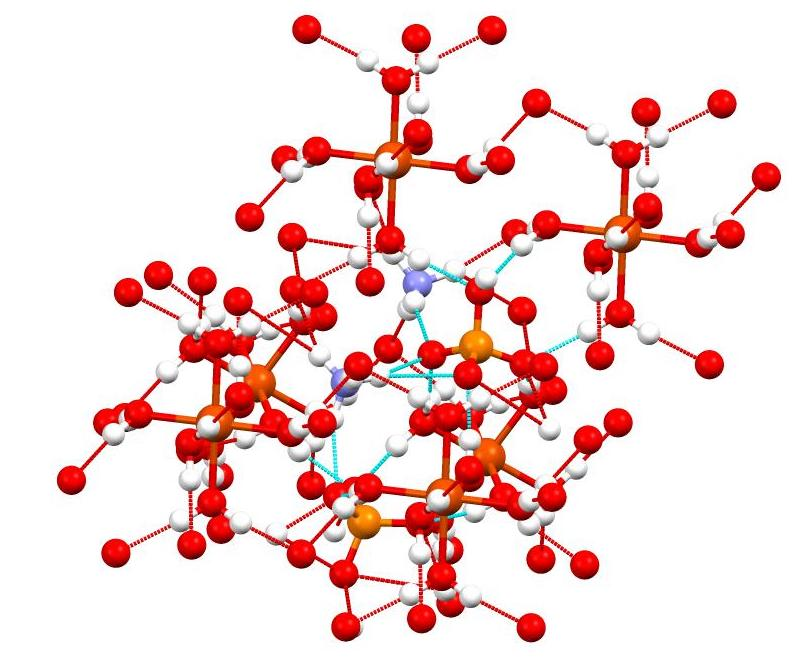
The same structure with hydrogen bonding network highlighted.

== History ==
Tutton salts are sometimes called Schönites after the naturally occurring mineral called Schönite (K_{2}Mg(SO_{4})_{2}(H_{2}O)_{6}). They are named for Alfred Edwin Howard Tutton, who identified and characterised a large range of these salts around 1900.
Such salts were of historical importance because they were obtainable in high purity and served as reliable reagents and spectroscopic standards.

== Table of salts ==
M^{1}	M^{2}	formula	name	a Å	b Å	c Å	β°	V Å^{3}	colour	Nα	Nβ	Nγ	Biaxial	2V	other
K	Cd	K_{2}[Cd(H_{2}O)_{6}](SO_{4})_{2}	Potassium cadmium sulfate hexahydrate												
Cs	Cd	Cs_{2}[Cd(H_{2}O)_{6}](SO_{4})_{2}	Caesium cadmium sulphate hexahydrate												
NH_{4}	Cd	(NH_{4})_{2}[Cd(H_{2}O)_{6}](SO_{4})_{2}	Ammonium Cadmium Sulfate Hydrate	9.395	12.776	6.299	106°43'	727.63	colourless	l.486	1.488	1.494	Biaxial(-f)	large	density=2.05 Slowly loses water in dry air.
K	Co	K_{2}[Co(H_{2}O)_{6}](SO_{4})_{2}	Potassium cobaltous sulfate	6.151	9.061	12.207	104.8°	657.78	red						density=2.21
Rb	Co	Rb_{2}[Co(H_{2}O)_{6}](SO_{4})_{2}	Rubidium hexaaquacobalt(II) sulphate	6.24	9.19	12.453	105.99°	686.5	ruby-red						desnsity=2.56
Cs	Co	Cs_{2}[Co(H_{2}O)_{6}](SO_{4})_{2}	Caesium hexaaquacobalt(II) sulphate	9.318(1)	12.826(3)	6.3650(9)	107.13(1)°	727.0	dark red						
NH_{4}	Co	(NH_{4})_{2}[Co(H_{2}O)_{6}](SO_{4})_{2}	Cobaltous ammonium sulfate hexahydrate	6.242	9.255	12.549	106.98°	693.3	purple						density=1.89
Tl	Co	Tl_{2}[Co(H_{2}O)_{6}](SO_{4})_{2}	Cobaltous thallium sulfate hexahydrate, Thallium hexaaquacobalt(II) sulfate,	9.227(1)	12.437(2)	6.220(1)	106.40(1)°	684.7	light red						
Tl	Co	Tl_{2}[Co(H_{2}O)_{6}](SO_{4})_{2}	Dithallium cobalt sulfate hexahydrate	9.235(1)	12.442(2)	6.227(1)	106.40(1)°		yellowish pink	1.599	1.613	1.624	biaxial(-)	medium large	density=4.180 g/cm^{3}
Rb	Cr	Rb_{2}[Cr(H_{2}O)_{6}](SO_{4})_{2}	Dirubidium chromium sulfate hexahydrate												
Cs	Cr	Cs_{2}[Cr(H_{2}O)_{6}](SO_{4})_{2}	Dicaesium chromium sulfate hexahydrate												
ND_{4}	Cr	(ND_{4})_{2}Cr(SO_{4})_{2} · 6 H_{2}O	Dideuterated ammonium chromium sulfate hexahydrate						bright blue,						formed from $\ce{CrSO4.3H2O}$ with ammonium sulfate in minimal water under nitrogen gas. Stable in air from oxidation, but may dehydrate.
K	Cu	K_{2}[Cu(H_{2}O)_{6}](SO_{4})_{2}	Cyanochroite	9.27	12.44	6.30	104.47	663.0	pale green blue						density=2.21 within unit cell 7.76 between two Cu atoms
Rb	Cu	Rb_{2}[Cu(H_{2}O)_{6}](SO_{4})_{2}	Dirubidium hexaaquacopper sulfate	9.267	12.366	6.228	105°19'	686.8	brilliant greenish blue	1.488	1.491	1.506	biaxial (+)	medium	density=2.580g/cm3 Cu-O 2.098 Å Rb-O 3.055 Å.
Cs	Cu	Cs_{2}[Cu(H_{2}O)_{6}](SO_{4})_{2}	Dicaesium hexaaquacopper sulfate	9.439	12.762	6.310	106°11'	718.5	brilliant greenish blue,	1.504	1.506	1.514	biaxial (+)		density=2.864g/cm3
NH_{4}	Cu	(NH_{4})_{2}[Cu(H_{2}O)_{6}](SO_{4})_{2}	Ammonium hexaaquacopper(II) sulfate	6.31	12.38	9.22	106.16°	691.25							density=1.921; heat of formation=-777.9 kcal/mol Jahn-Teller distortion axis switches under pressure of ~1500 bars, a,b axis shrinks 3.3% and 3.5% and c axis extends 4.5%.
Tl	Cu	Tl_{2}[Cu(H_{2}O)_{6}](SO_{4})_{2}	Thallium copper sulfate hydrate	9.268	12.364	6.216	105°33'		brilliant greenish blue	1.600	1.610	1.620	biaxial	very large	density=3.740 g/cm3
K	Fe	K_{2}[Fe(H_{2}O)_{6}](SO_{4})_{2}	Dipotassium iron sulfate hexahydrate												
Rb	Fe	Rb_{2}[Fe(H_{2}O)_{6}](SO_{4})_{2}	Rubidium iron sulfate hydrate	9.218	12.497	6.256	105°45'		pale green	1.480	1.489	1.501	biaxial (+)	large,	density=2.523g/cm3
Cs	Fe	Cs_{2}[Fe(H_{2}O)_{6}](SO_{4})_{2}	Caesium hexaaquairon(II) sulphate	9.357(2)	12.886(2)	6.381(1)	106.94(1)°	736.0	dark yellow very pale green	1.501	1.504	1.516	biaxial (+)	medium	density=2.805
NH_{4}	Fe	(NH_{4})_{2}[Fe(H_{2}O)_{6}](SO_{4})_{2}	Mohrite	6.24(1)	12.65(2)	9.32(2)	106.8(1)	704.28	vitreous pale green						density=1.85 named after Karl Friedrich Mohr
Tl	Fe	Tl_{2}[Fe(H_{2}O)_{6}](SO_{4})_{2}	Thallium hexaaquairon(II) sulfate	9.262(2)	12.497(1)	6.235(2)	106.15(1)°	693.2	light green	1.590	1.605	=1.616	biaxial (-)	large	density=3.662g/cm3
K	Mg	K_{2}[Mg(H_{2}O)_{6}](SO_{4})_{2}	Picromerite	9.04	12.24	6.095	104° 48'		colourless or white	1.460	1.462	1.472	biaxial (+)	medium	density=2.025g/cm3; expanded second coordination sphere around Mg.
Rb	Mg	Rb_{2}[Mg(H_{2}O)_{6}](SO_{4})_{2}	Rubidium magnesium sulphate hexahydrate	9.235	12.486	6.224	105°59'		colourless	1.467	1.469	1.476	biaxial		
Cs	Mg	Cs_{2}[Mg(H_{2}O)_{6}](SO4)_{2}	Caesium hexaaquamagnesium sulphate	9.338(2)	12.849(4)	6.361(2)	107.07(2)°	729.6	colourless	1.481	1.485	1.492	biaxial(+)	medium	density=2.689
NH_{4}	Mg	(NH_{4})_{2}[Mg(H_{2}O)_{6}](SO_{4})_{2}	Boussingaultite	9.28	12.57	6.2	107°6'								
NH_{4}	Mg	(NH_{4})_{2}[Mg(H_{2}O)_{6}](SO_{4})_{2}	Ammonium Magnesium Chromium Oxide Hydrate	9.508±.001	12.674	6.246	106°14'		bright yellow	1.637	1.638	1.653	biaxial(+)	small	density=1.840 g/cm ^{3}
Tl	Mg	Tl_{2}[Mg(H_{2}O)_{6}](SO_{4})_{2}	dithallium magnesium sulfate hexahydrate	9.22 9.262(2)	12.42 12.459(2)	6.185 6.207(1)	106°30' 106.39(2)°	687.1	colourless						density=3.532 g/cm^{3}
Rb	Mn	Rb_{2}[Mn(H_{2}O)_{6}](SO_{4})_{2}	Dirubidium hexaaquamanganese sulfate(VI)	9.282(2)	12.600(2)	6.254(2)	105.94(2)	703.3Å^{3}							
Cs	Mn	Cs_{2}[Mn(H_{2}O)_{6}](SO_{4})_{2}	Caesium hexaaquamanganese(II) sulphate	9.418(3)	12.963(2)	6.386(3)	107.17(4)°	744.9	pale pink purplish white	1.495	1.497	1.502	biaxial(+)	large	density=2.763
NH_{4}	Mn	(NH_{4})_{2}[Mn(H_{2}O)_{6}](SO_{4})_{2}	Manganese ammonium sulfate hexahydrate	9.40	12.74	6.26	107.0°		pale pink	1.482	1.456	1.492	biaxial(+)	large	density=1.827
Tl	Mn	Tl_{2}[Mn(H_{2}O)_{6}](SO_{4})_{2}	Thallium manganese sulfate hexahydrate	9.3276(6), 9.322(2)	12.5735(8), 12.565(2)	6.2407(4), and 6.233(1)	106.310(3)° 106.29(2)°,	700.8	light pink						
K	Ni	K_{2}Ni(SO_{4})_{2} · 6 H_{2}O	Potassium Nickel Sulfate Hexahydrate												used as UV filter
Rb	Ni	Rb_{2}[Ni(H_{2}O)_{6}](SO_{4})_{2}	Rubidium Nickel Sulfate Hexahydrate	6.221	12.41	9.131	106.055°	677.43							001 surface has step growth of 4.6 Å, optical transmission bands at 250, 500 and 860 nm which are the same as nickel sulfate hexahydrate, but UV band transmits more. Heavy absorption 630-720 nm and 360-420 nm^{3} density 2.596 g cm^{−3}. stable to 100.5 °C solubility in g/100ml=0.178t + 4.735 MW=529.87
Cs	Ni	Cs_{2}[Ni(H_{2}O)_{6}](SO_{4})_{2}	Caesium hexaaquanickel(II) sulphate, Caesium Nickel Sulfate Hexahydrate	9.259(2)	12.767(2)	6.358(1)	107.00(2)°	718.7	greenish blue	1.507	1.512	1.516	biaxial(-)	very large	density=2.883 used as UV filter
NH_{4}	Ni	(NH_{4})_{2}[Ni(H_{2}O)_{6}](SO_{4})_{2}	Nickel-boussingaultite	9.186	12.468	6.424		684.0	blueish green.						density=1.918 cas=51287-85-5
Tl	Ni	Tl_{2}[Ni(H_{2}O)_{6}](SO_{4})_{2}	Thallium hexaaquanickel(II) sulfate	9.161(2)	12.389(2)	6.210(2)	106.35(2)°	676.3	greenish blue	1.602	1.615	1.620	biaxial(-)	large	density=3.763
K	Ru	K_{2}[Ru(H_{2}O)_{6}](SO_{4})_{2}	Potassium hexaaquaruthenium(II) sulfate	8.950	12.268	6.135	105.27	644							
Rb	Ru	Rb_{2}[Ru(H_{2}O)_{6}](SO_{4})_{2}	Rubidium hexaaquaruthenium(II) sulfate	9.132	12.527	6.351	106.30								
K	V	K_{2}[V(H_{2}O)_{6}](SO_{4})_{2}	Vanadium(II) potassium sulfate hexahydrate												
Rb	V	Rb_{2}[V(H_{2}O)_{6}](SO_{4})_{2}	Rubidium vanadium(II) sulfate												
NH_{4}	V	(NH_{4})_{2}[V(H_{2}O)_{6}](SO_{4})_{2}	Vanadium(II) ammonium sulfate hexahydrate	9.42	12.76	6.22	107.2°	714.2	amethyst						density=1.8 V-O length 2.15Å
K	Zn	K_{2}[Zn(H_{2}O)_{6}](SO_{4})_{2}	Dipotassium zinc sulphate hexahydrate	9.041	12.310	6.182	104.777°		colourless	1.478	1.481	1.496	biaxial	large	density=2.242g/cm3 Thermal decomposition at 252K.
Rb	Zn	Rb_{2}[Zn(H_{2}O)_{6}](SO_{4})_{2}	Rubidium Zinc Sulphate Hexahydrate	9.185	12.450	6.242	105°54'		colourless	1.483	1.489	1.497	biaxial	large	
Cs	Zn	Cs_{2}[Zn(H_{2}O)_{6}](SO_{4})_{2}	Zinc caesium sulphate hexahydrate	9.314(2)	12.817(2)	6.369(2)	106.94(2)°	727.3	colourless	1.507	1.610	1.615	biaxial(-)	large	density=2.881
NH_{4}	Zn	(NH_{4})_{2}[Zn(H_{2}O)_{6}](SO_{4})_{2}	Ammonium hexaaquazinc(II) sulfate	9.205	12.475	6.225	106°52'	684.1							heat of fusion 285 J/g
Tl	Zn	Tl_{2}[Zn(H_{2}O)_{6}](SO_{4})_{2}	Thallium hexaaquazinc(II) sulfate	9.219(2)	12.426(2)	6.226(1)	106.29(2)°	684.6	colourless						
Cs	Ni	Cs_{2}[Zn(H_{2}O)_{6}](SeO_{4})_{2}	Dicaesium nickel selenate hexahydrate	7.4674	7.9152	11.7972	106.363	669.04	light green						
Rb	Cu	Rb_{2}[Cu(H_{2}O)_{6}](SeO_{4})_{2}	Dirubidium copper selenate hexahydrate	6.363	12.431	9.373	104.33	718.3							

== Organic salts ==
Some organic bases can also form salts that crystallise like Tutton's salts.

formula	name	a Å	b Å	c Å	β°	V Å^{3}	colour	Nα	Nβ	Nγ	Biaxial	2V	other
(C_{4}H_{12}N_{2})[Zn(H_{2}O)_{6}](SO_{4})_{2}	Piperazinediium hexaaquazinc(II) bis(sulfate)	12.9562	10.6502	13.3251	114.032	1679.30	Colourless						
(C_{4}H_{8}N_{3}O)_{2}[Cd(H_{2}O)_{6}](SO_{4})_{2}	Cadmium creatininium sulfate	6.5584	27.871	7.1955	110.371	1232.99	colourless						

== Extra reading ==
- McDonald, Corissa P.; Yoder, Claude H. (18 July 2026). "Prediction of the Stability of Tutton Salts Using the Simple Salt Approximation". Minerals. 16 (7): 749. doi:10.3390/min16070749.
- da Silva Neto, Otávio C.; Alves, Eduardo S.; Jucá, Raí F.; da Silva, Rômulo S.; Olivier, Lucas S.A.; da Silva Filho, José G.; de Lima Júnior, José A.; Freire, Paulo T.C.; Souto, Eliana B.; Lang, Rossano; dos Santos, Adenilson O.; de Oliveira Neto, João G. (January 2027). "Pressure-induced structural instabilities in (NH4)2Cu(SO4)2(H2O)6 Tutton salt: An in situ Raman and DFPT investigation up to 6.5 GPa". Spectrochimica Acta Part A: Molecular and Biomolecular Spectroscopy. 364 128531. doi:10.1016/j.saa.2026.128531.
