= Chris Tutton =

English writer

Chris Tutton is an English poet, novelist, musician, songwriter, playwright and performer.

== Performance ==
He participates in literature festivals across the country, including the Edinburgh International Book Festival, Manchester, Cheltenham, Birmingham, Dartington; Ways with Words etc. and performs at theatres (including The Lyric, Hammersmith, Riverside Studios, Oldham Coliseum) and arts centres and libraries throughout the UK.

He is a popular compere and host and in 2006 launched Westwords (a literature festival in London) at the BBC, White City and has for several years hosted the Harrow Artsfest. He runs both writing and performance workshops and masterclasses and has worked in partnership with the London Libraries Development Agency and the BBC RAW project.

He first came to the nation's attention with his twice-weekly appearances on two series of ITV's Shift in 1996. Since then he has made many appearances on Warehouse Carlton TV, FYI Carlton, Big Breakfast Channel 4, as well as a number of regional magazine programmes, plus poetry and music for Ran, HTV and One Arts for Channel One. Radio appearances include Loose Ends, BBC Radio 4, Shaun Keaveny BBC 6 Music, Mark Radcliffe, BBC Radio 1 and Nationwide and Roscoe on Five, Radio 5 plus many regional BBC radio programmes.

His latest residencies have been at Chippenham and Warminster Libraries.

== Books ==
- Ariadne's Lament (1993)
- Acnestis in Elysium (1995)
- Ecumenical Shadows (1998)
- Rain Angel (2003)
- Seasons of Winter (2005)
- Angles of Repose (2012)
- Impossible Memories (2016)
- Feathers of Wind (2018) CD
- The Failing of Angels (2020) Novel
- . Short Chapters From Sunset. Selected Verse (2023)
- Pendulum. The Poetry of Dreams, contributor (2008)
- Of Love and Hope, contributor (2010) Poetry anthology in aid of Breakthrough Breast Cancer and Breast Cancer Care, with Sir Paul McCartney, Seamus Heaney, Leonard Cohen etc.
- Seductive Harmonies; the Poetry of Music, contributor (2012)
- Wordstrokes; the Poetry of Art, contributor (2016)
- Quartet; the Four Seasons contributor (2018)
- Spring of the Muses, contributor (2019)

== Prizes ==
The Sunday Times Interaction Community Theatre Prize

== Radio plays ==
- Poison Ivy
- An Oak Leaf in November
- The Power and the Glory
