= Boussingaultite =

Rare ammonium magnesium sulfate mineral

General
- Category: Sulfate mineral
- Formula: (NH_{4})_{2}Mg(SO_{4})_{2}·6H_{2}O
- IMA symbol: Bsg
- Strunz classification: 7.CC.60
- Dana classification: 29.03.07.02
- Crystal system: Monoclinic
- Crystal class: Prismatic (2/m) (same H-M symbol)
- Space group: P2_{1}/a
- Unit cell: a = 9.324(7) Å, b = 12.597(9) Å, c = 6.211(5) Å; β = 1.472°; Z = 2

Identification
- Formula mass: 360.60 g/mol
- Color: Colorless, yellow pink, light yellow, pink; colorless in transmitted light
- Cleavage: {201} perfect (synthetic)
- Mohs scale hardness: 2
- Luster: Vitreous (glassy), silky
- Streak: White
- Diaphaneity: Transparent to translucent
- Specific gravity: 1.73
- Density: 1.7 g/cm^{3}
- Optical properties: Biaxial (+)
- 2V angle: 51°11′
- Dispersion: r > v, perceptible
- Solubility: Soluble in H_{2}O

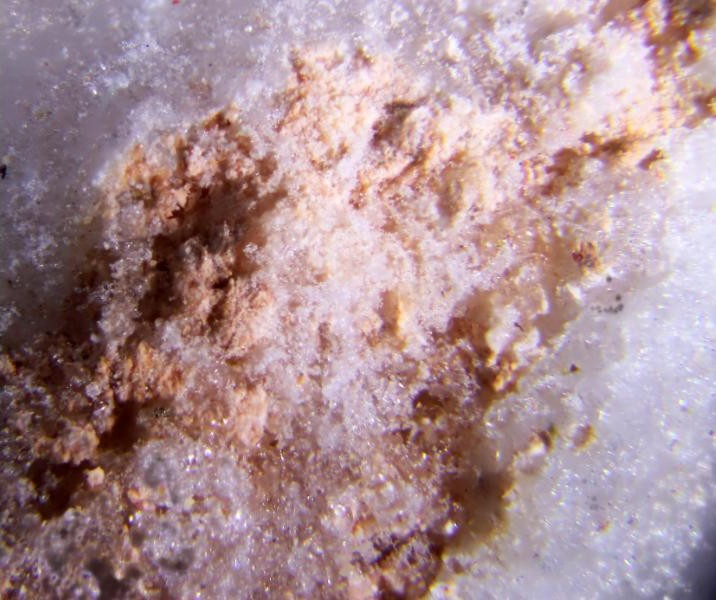
boussingaultite

Boussingaultite is a rare ammonium magnesium hydrated sulfate mineral of the chemical formula: (NH_{4})_{2}Mg(SO_{4})_{2} · 6 H_{2}O. The formula of boussingaultite is that of Tutton's salts type. It was originally described from geothermal fields in Tuscany, Italy, where it occurs together with its iron analogue mohrite, but is more commonly found on burning coal dumps. The mineral possess monoclinic symmetry and forms clear, often rounded crystals.

The mineral is named after the French chemist Jean-Baptiste Boussingault (1802–1887).

Nickelboussingaultite has been found in a meteorite.

== See also ==
- Mohr's salt
- Mohrite
