= Fluoroberyllate =

Fluoroberyllate is an anion of fluorine and beryllium and compounds containing it with other elements. The main kinds are the tetrafluoroberyllates (BeF_{4})^{2−}, the trifluoroberyllates (BeF_{3})^{−}, polymeric fluoroberyllates (which can crystalize similar to silica containing minerals) and fluoroberyllate glass.
