= Thallium(I) carbonate =

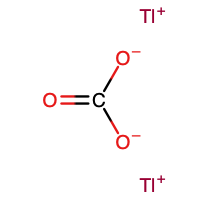
- Thallium(I) carbonate

Names
- Other names thallium monocarbonate

Identifiers
CAS Number	6533-73-9
3D model (JSmol)	Interactive image
ChemSpider	21553
ECHA InfoCard	100.026.759
EC Number	229-434-0
PubChem CID	23031
RTECS number	XG4000000
UNII	H673633FTH
UN number	1707
CompTox Dashboard (EPA)	DTXSID1024332
- InChI: InChI=1S/CH2O3.2Tl/c2-1(3)4;;/h(H2,2,3,4);;/q;2*+1/p-2 Key: DASUJKKKKGHFBF-UHFFFAOYSA-L; InChI=1/CH2O3.2Tl/c2-1(3)4;;/h(H2,2,3,4);;/q;2*+1/p-2 Key: DASUJKKKKGHFBF-NUQVWONBAJ
- SMILES: [Tl+].[Tl+].[O-]C([O-])=O

Properties
Chemical formula	Tl_{2}CO_{3}
Molar mass	468.776 g/mol
Appearance	white crystals
Odor	odorless
Density	7.11 g/cm^{3}, solid
Melting point	272 °C (522 °F; 545 K)
Solubility in water	5.2 g/100 mL (25 °C); 27.2 g/100 mL (100 °C)
Solubility	insoluble in alcohol, ether, acetone
Magnetic susceptibility (χ)	−101.6·10^{−6} cm^{3}/mol

Structure
Crystal structure	monoclinic

Hazards
- GHS labelling
Pictograms	(GHS06: Toxic) (GHS08: Health hazard) (GHS09: Environmental hazard)
Signal word	Danger
Hazard statements	H300, H330, H373, H411
Precautionary statements	P260, P264, P270, P271, P273, P284, P301+P310, P304+P340, P310, P314, P320, P330, P391, P403+P233, P405, P501
NFPA 704 (fire diamond)	4 0 0
- Lethal dose or concentration (LD, LC)
LD_{50} (median dose)	21 mg/kg (mouse, oral)
LD_{Lo} (lowest published)	23 mg/kg (rat, oral)
- Except where otherwise noted, data are given for materials in their standard state (at 25 °C [77 °F], 100 kPa). verify (what is ?) Infobox references

Thallium(I) carbonate is the inorganic compound with the formula Tl_{2}CO_{3}. It is a white, water-soluble salt. It has no or very few commercial applications. It is produced by treatment of thallous hydroxide with CO_{2}.

== Safety ==
Like other thallium compounds, it is extremely toxic, with an oral median lethal dose of 21 mg/kg in mice. Due to its toxicity, it is listed in the United States List of Extremely Hazardous Substances as of 2007.
