= Alfred Edwin Howard Tutton =

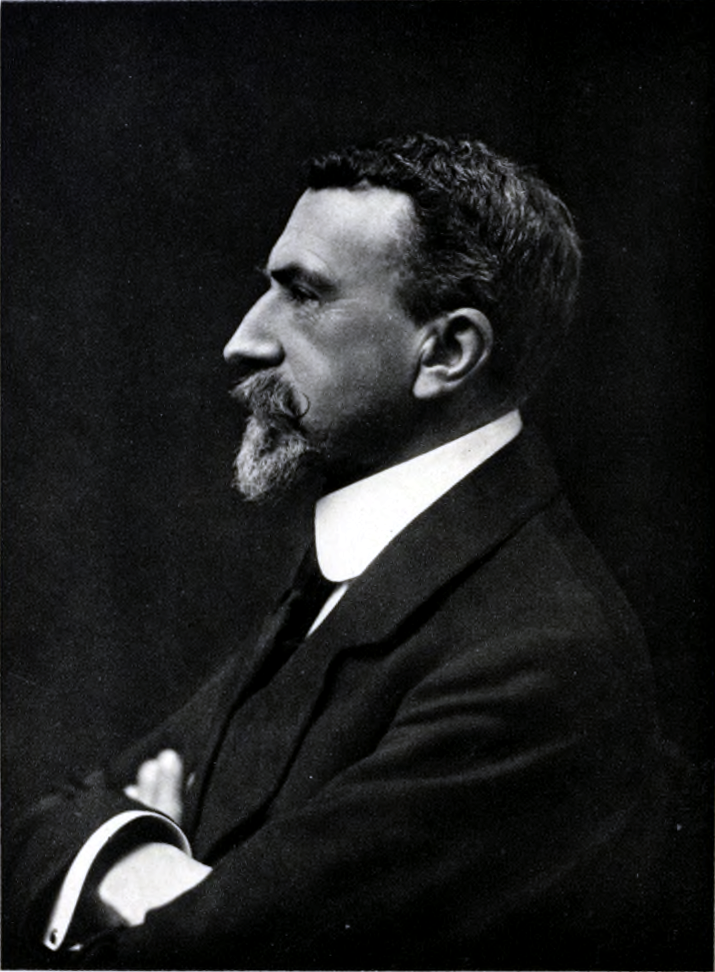
Alfred E. H. Tutton

Alfred Edwin Howard Tutton (22 August 1864 – 14 July 1938) was a British chemistry teacher and later inspector of schools who was a crystallographer in his spare time. He was elected Fellow of the Royal Society in 1899.

== Life and work ==
Tutton was born in Cheadle Moseley, Cheshire, to Venetian blind-maker James Tutton. Educated at the National School, Edgeley, he worked for a while as a town clerk and later as a medical officer at Stockport. He attended evening classes in chemistry at Owens College with lectures by Sir Henry Roscoe. A scholarship allowed him to study under Percy Faraday Frankland, Thomas Edward Thorpe, John Wesley Judd and Arthur William Rucker at the Royal College of Science in London for three years.

He became a lecturer in chemistry in 1889 and an inspector for schools in 1895. He set up a laboratory at home and began to work on crystallography in his spare time. He taught himself everything about crystallography on his own, except for some assistance from HA Miers. He designed instruments to measure crystal angles and interferometers, which were made for him by Troughton & Simms. He studied the oxides of phosphorus in collaboration with Thorpe. Until 1895 his work was based in South Kensington, where Thorpe was working, and after this date he moved to Oxford. While there he continued his education and received a BSc (1895) and a DSc (1903) from New College.

He published several books on crystallography and was elected Fellow of the Royal Society in 1899. In 1905, he was transferred to London and in 1911 to Morant. He visited Canada in 1909 to lecture on "the seven styles of crystal architecture". He retired in 1924.

Using his interferometric technique, he was able to verify the use of the wavelength of a specific spectral line as a way of standardizing the imperial yard in 1930. He received an honorary DSc from Manchester University in 1926. In 1937, he travelled to India to attend the Indian Science Congress. He died at Dallington, East Sussex, the next year.

Tutton's books included Crystalline Structure and Chemical Constitution (1910), Crystallography and Practical Crystal Measurement (1911, 1922) and Crystals (1911). His interest in mountaineering led to his book The Natural History of Ice and Snow (1927), which in turn led to the United Kingdom Antarctic Place-Names Committee (UK-APC) naming a location in the Antarctic Tutton Point.

Tutton married Margaret Loat in 1902 and they had two sons and four daughters. He was a keen mountaineer and had an accident in 1926. He suffered from failing eyesight towards the end of his life.
