= Ammonium iron(II) sulfate =

- (NH^{+}_{4})_{2}[Fe(H_{2}O)_{6}]^{2+}[SO_{4}^{2−}]_{2}
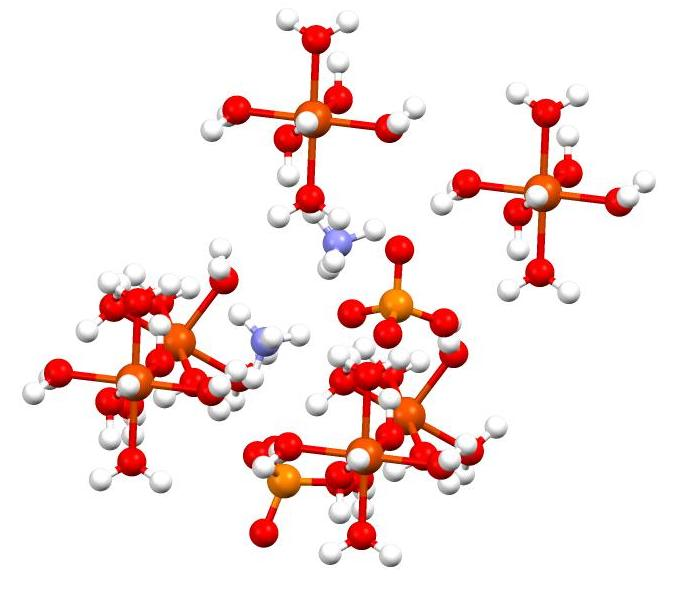

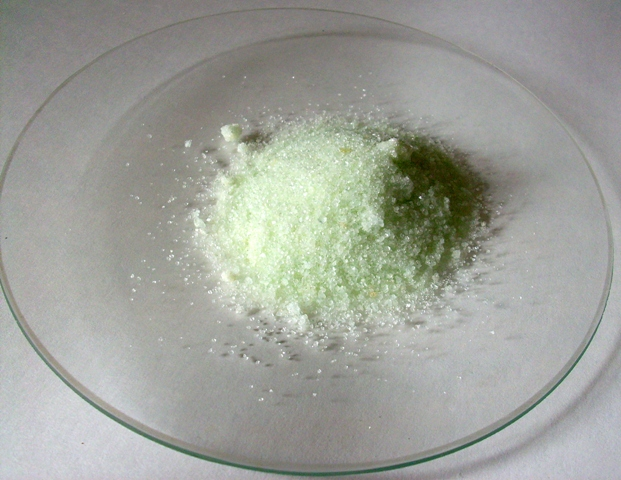

Names
- IUPAC name Ammonium iron(II) sulfate
- Other names Ferrous ammonium sulfate Ammonium iron sulfate Mohr's salt

Identifiers
CAS Number	anhydrous: 10045-89-3; hexahydrate: 7783-85-9
3D model (JSmol)	Interactive image
ChEBI	anhydrous: CHEBI:76243; hexahydrate: CHEBI:76181
ChemSpider	anhydrous: 23246; hexahydrate: 13084980
ECHA InfoCard	100.030.125
EC Number	233-151-8
PubChem CID	anhydrous: 24863; hexahydrate: 15942308
UNII	anhydrous: 9Q764AYJ9G; hexahydrate: 99A04ICQ3J
CompTox Dashboard (EPA)	DTXSID4041028
- InChI: InChI=1S/Fe.2H3N.2H2O4S/c;;;2*1-5(2,3)4/h;2*1H3;2*(H2,1,2,3,4)/q+2;;;;/p-2 Key: IMBKASBLAKCLEM-UHFFFAOYSA-L; InChI=1/Fe.2H3N.2H2O4S/c;;;2*1-5(2,3)4/h;2*1H3;2*(H2,1,2,3,4)/q+2;;;;/p-2 Key: IMBKASBLAKCLEM-NUQVWONBAX
- SMILES: [Fe+2].[O-]S(=O)(=O)[O-].[O-]S([O-])(=O)=O.[NH4+].[NH4+]

Properties
Chemical formula	Fe(SO_{4})(NH_{4})_{2}(SO_{4}) (anhydrous); Fe(SO_{4})(NH_{4})_{2}(SO_{4})·6H_{2}O (hexahydrate)
Molar mass	284.05 g mol^{−1} (anhydrous); 392.14 g mol^{−1} (hexahydrate)
Appearance	Blue-green solid
Density	1.86 g/cm^{3}
Melting point	100 to 110 °C (212 to 230 °F; 373 to 383 K)
Boiling point	Not applicable
Solubility in water	269 g/L (hexahydrate)

Hazards
- GHS labelling
Pictograms	(GHS07: Exclamation mark)
Signal word	Warning
Hazard statements	H315, H319, H335
Precautionary statements	P261, P264, P271, P280, P302+P352, P304+P340, P305+P351+P338, P312, P321, P332+P313, P337+P313, P362, P403+P233, P405, P501
NFPA 704 (fire diamond)	2 0 0
Safety data sheet (SDS)	Fisher MSDS

Related compounds
Related compounds	Ammonium iron(III) sulfate; Ammonium magnesium sulfate
- Except where otherwise noted, data are given for materials in their standard state (at 25 °C [77 °F], 100 kPa). verify (what is ?) Infobox references

Ammonium iron(II) sulfate, or Mohr's salt, is the inorganic compound with the formula (NH_{4})_{2}SO_{4}·Fe(SO_{4})·6H_{2}O. Containing two different cations, Fe^{2+} and NH^{+}_{4}, it is classified as a double salt of ferrous sulfate and ammonium sulfate. It is a common laboratory reagent because it is readily crystallized, and crystals resist oxidation by air. Like the other ferrous sulfate salts, ferrous ammonium sulfate dissolves in water to give the aquo complex [Fe(H_{2}O)_{6}]^{2+}, which has octahedral molecular geometry. Its mineral form is mohrite.

== Structure ==
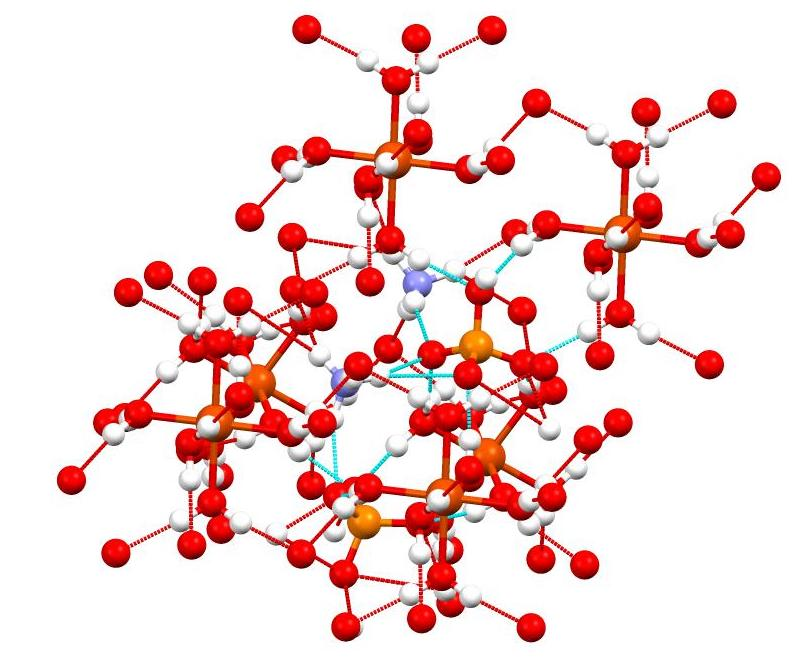
Structure of ferrous ammonium sulfate with hydrogen bonding network highlighted (N is violet, O is red; S is orange, Fe is light red).

This compound is a member of a group of double sulfates called Schönites or Tutton's salts. Tutton's salts form monoclinic crystals and have formula M_{2}N(SO_{4})_{2}·6H_{2}O (M = various monocations). With regards to the bonding, crystals consist of octahedra [Fe(H_{2}O)_{6}]^{2+} centers, which are hydrogen bonded to sulfate and ammonium.

Mohr's salt is named after the German chemist Karl Friedrich Mohr, who made many important advances in the methodology of titration in the 19th century.

== Preparation ==
Mohr's salt forms upon evaporation of an equimolar mixture of aqueous ferrous sulfate and ammonium sulfate.

=== Contaminants ===
Common impurities include magnesium, nickel, manganese, lead, and zinc, many of which form isomorphous salts.

== Applications ==
In analytical chemistry, this salt is the preferred source of ferrous ions as the solid has a long shelf life, being resistant to oxidation. This stability extends somewhat to solutions reflecting the effect of pH on the ferrous–ferric redox couple. This oxidation occurs more readily at high pH. The ammonium ions make solutions of Mohr's salt slightly acidic, which slows this oxidation process. Sulfuric acid is commonly added to solutions to reduce oxidation to ferric iron.

It is used in Gel dosimetry to measure high doses of gamma rays.
