= Tutton Point =

Tutton Point (66°53′S 67°36′W) is the southwestern point of Liard Island in Hanusse Bay, Graham Land. This point is a landing place, the start of a route into the interior of the island. Mapped from air photos taken by Ronne Antarctic Research Expedition (RARE) (1947–48) and Falkland Islands and Dependencies Aerial Survey Expedition (FIDASE) (1956–57). Named by United Kingdom Antarctic Place-Names Committee (UK-APC) for Alfred E.H. Tutton (1864–1938), British mineralogist, author of The Natural History of Ice and Snow Illustrated from the Alps.
