= Mohrite =

Rare ammonium iron(II) sulfate mineral

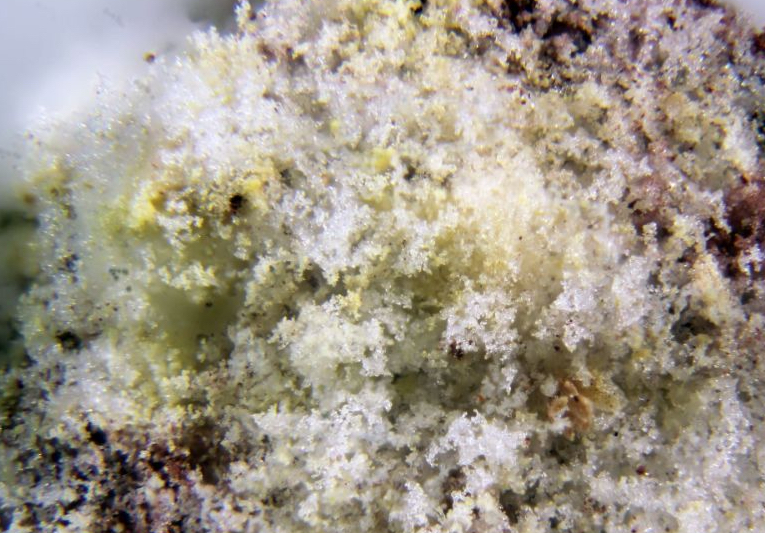
- A close up of the yellowish microcrystals of the mohrite mineral

General
- Category: Minerals
- Formula: (NH_{4})_{2}Fe(SO_{4})_{2}·6 H_{2}O

Mohrite, (NH_{4})_{2}Fe(SO_{4})_{2}·6 H_{2}O, is a rare ammonium iron(II) sulfate mineral originally found in the geothermal fields of Tuscany, Italy. This Fe-dominant analogue of boussingaultite is sometimes reported from burning coal dumps where it is a product of pyrite oxidation.

The mineral crystallizes in the monoclinic crystal system with space group P2_{1}/a.

== See also ==
- Acid mine drainage, pyrite oxidation
- Mohr's salt
