= Sulfate fluoride =

Class of chemical compounds

The sulfate fluorides are double salts that contain both sulfate and fluoride anions. They are in the class of mixed anion compounds. Some of these minerals are deposited in fumaroles.

Fluoride sulfates were first discovered by Jean Charles de Marignac in 1859.

Some elements such as cobalt or uranium can form complexes that contain fluoride and sulfate groups, and would be referred to as fluoro and sulfato metallates.

For some of these materials, the birefringence is tiny, but not zero. This allows their use in a zero-order waveplate.

== List ==
=== Minerals ===
| name | formula | ratio | system | space group | unit cell Å | volume | density | optical | references |
|---|---|---|---|---|---|---|---|---|---|
| Chukhrovite-(Ca) | Ca_{4.5}Al_{2}(SO_{4})F_{13}·12H_{2}O | 1:13 | Isometric | Fd3 | a = 16.749 Z=8 | 4698.6 | 2.23 | isotropic n = 1.432 | |
| Chukhrovite-(Ce) | Ca_{3}(Y,Ce)(AlF_{6})_{2}(SO_{4})F · 10H_{2}O | 1:13 | Isometric | Fd3 | | | | | |
| Chukhrovite-(Y) | Ca_{3}(Ce,Y)(AlF_{6})_{2}(SO_{4})F · 10H_{2}O | 1:13 | Isometric | Fd3 | | | | | |
| Chukhrovite-(Nd) | Ca_{3}(Nd,Y)Al_{2}(SO_{4})F_{13}·12H_{2}O | 1:13 | Isometric | Fd3 | a = 16.759 Z=8 | 4,707.0 | 2.42 | isotropic n_{α} = 1.443 | |
| Meniaylovite | Ca_{4}[(SO_{4})(SiF_{6})(AlF_{6})]F · 12H_{2}O | 1:13 | Isometric | Fd3 | a = 16.722 Z=8 | 4,675.89 | | Isotropic n = 1.43 | |
| Pseudograndreefite | Pb_{6}(SO_{4})F_{10} | 1:10 | Orthorhombic | F2 2 2 | a = 8.51 b = 19.57 c = 8.49 Z=4 | 1,413.93 | | Biaxial (+) n_{α} = 1.864 n_{β} = 1.865 n_{γ} = 1.873 2V: measured: 30° , calculated: 40° Max birefringence: δ = 0.009 | |
| Creedite | Ca_{3}SO_{4}Al_{2}F_{8}(OH)_{2} · 2H_{2}O | 1:8 | Monoclinic | B2/b | a = 13.936, b = 8.606, c = 9.985 β = 94.39° Z=4 | 1,194.02 | 2.713 | Biaxial (-) n_{α} = 1.461 n_{β} = 1.478 n_{γ} = 1.485 Max birefringence: δ = 0.024 | |
| Thermessaite | K_{2}AlF_{3}(SO_{4}) | 1:3 | Orthorhombic | Pbcn | a = 10.81 b = 8.336 c = 6.822 | 614.75 | 2.77 | | |
| Grandreefite | Pb_{2}(SO_{4})F_{2} | 1:2 | monoclinic | A2/a | a = 8.667 b = 4.4419 c = 14.242 β = 107.418 Z=4 | 523.15 | 7.15 | Biaxial (+) n_{α} = 1.872 n_{β} = 1.873 n_{γ} = 1.897 2V: Measured: 23° Max Birefringence: δ = 0.025 | |
| Arangasite | Al_{2}F(PO_{4})(SO_{4}) · 9H_{2}O | 1:1 | monoclinic | P2/a | a = 7.073 b = 9.634 c = 10.827 β = 100.40 Z = 2 | 725.7 | 2.01 | Biaxial (+) ?n_{α} = 1.493(5) n_{γ} = 1.485(5) Max birefringence: δ = 0.008 | |
| Kantorite | K_{2}NaMg(SO_{4})_{2}F | 2:1 | orthorhombic | Pna2_{1} | a = 6.9894 b = 7.1378 c = 17.925 Z = 4 | 894.25 | | Biaxial (+), α = 1.447, β = 1.449, γ = 1.452 and 2V = 79°. | |
| Khademite | Al(SO_{4})F · 5H_{2}O | 1:1 | orthorhombic | | a = 11.17 b = 13.05 c = 10.88 | 1,585.96 | 1.925 | Biaxial (-) n_{α} = 1.440 n_{β} = 1.460 n_{γ} = 1.487 2V: measured: 68° calculated: 84° Max birefringence δ = 0.047 colourless | |
| Kogarkoite | Na_{3}(SO_{4})F | 1:1 | Monoclinic | ?P2_{1} | a = 18.07 b = 6.94 c = 11.44 β = 107.72° Z=12 | 1,366.58 | 2.676 | Biaxial (+) n_{α} = 1.439 n_{β} = 1.439 n_{γ} = 1.442 Max Birefringence: δ = 0.003 | |
| kononovite | NaMg(SO_{4})F | 1:1 | monoclinic | C2/c | a = 6.662 b = 8.584 c = 7.035 β = 114.06 Z=4 | 367.4 | 2.91 | biaxial (+), n_{α} = 1.488 n_{β} = 1.491 n_{γ} = 1.496 2V_{meas} = 75° Max birefringence: δ = 0.008 | |
| Lannonite | Mg_{2}Ca_{4}Al_{4}(SO_{4})_{8}F_{8} · 24H_{2}O | 8:8 | Tetragonal | I4/m | a = 6.860 c = 28.053 | 1,320.16 | 2.22 | Uniaxial (+) n_{ω} = 1.460 n_{ε} = 1.478 Max Birefringence:δ = 0.018 | |
| Sulphohalite | Na_{6}(SO_{4})_{2}FCl | 2:1 | Isometric | Fm3̅m | | | | Isotropic | |
| Uklonskovite | NaMgSO_{4}F•2H_{2}O | 1:1 | monoclinic | | a = 7.2 Å, b = 7.21 Å, c = 5.73 β = 113.23° | 273.34 | | Biaxial (+) n_{α} = 1.476 n_{γ} = 1.500 Max Birefringence δ = 0.024 | |
| Vlodavetsite | AlCa_{2}(SO_{4})_{2}F_{2}Cl · 4H_{2}O | 2:2 | Tetragonal | I4/m | a = 6.870, c = 13.342 Z=2 | 629.70 | | Uniaxial (+) n_{ω} = 1.509 n_{ε} = 1.526 Max birefringence: δ = 0.017 | |
| Schairerite | Na_{21}(SO_{4})_{7}ClF_{6} | 7:6 | trigonal | 3_2/m | a = 12.17 c = 19.29 | 2,474.25 | 2.67 | Uniaxial (+) n_{ω} = 1.440 n_{ε} = 1.445 Max birefringence: δ = 0.005 | |
| Galeite | Na_{15}(SO_{4})_{5}F_{4}Cl | 5:4 | Trigonal | | a = 12.17 c = 13.94 | 1,788.03 | | Uniaxial (+) n_{ω} = 1.447 n_{ε} = 1.449 Max Birefringence: δ = 0.002 | |
| Fluorellestadite | Ca_{10}(SiO_{4})_{3}(SO_{4})_{3}F_{2} | 3:2 | hexagonal | | a = 9.53 c = 6.91 | 543.49 | 3.03 | Uniaxial (-) n_{ω} = 1.655 n_{ε} = 1.650 Max birefringence:δ = 0.005 | |
| Straßmannite | Al(UO_{2})(SO_{4})_{2}F·16H_{2}O | 2:1 | monoclinic | C2/c | a = 11.0187 b = 8.3284 c = 26.673 β = 97.426° | 2427.2 | 2.20 | pale yellowish green Biaxial (-) n_{α} = 1.477(2) n_{β} = 1.485(2) n_{γ} = 1.489(2) 2V: measured: 70° calculated: 70.2° Max birefringence: δ = 0.012 | |
| Svyazhinite | (Mg,Mn^{2+},Ca)(Al,Fe^{3+})(SO_{4})_{2}F · 14H_{2}O | 2:1 | triclinic | | a = 6.21 b = 13.3 c = 6.25 α = 90.15°, β = 93.56°, γ = 82.08° | 510.29 | | Biaxial (-) n_{α} = 1.423 n_{β} = 1.439 n_{γ} = 1.444 2V: calculated: 56° Max birefringence: δ = 0.021 | |
| Wilcoxite | MgAl(SO_{4})_{2}F · 17H_{2}O | 2:1 | triclinic | P1̅ | a = 6.644, b = 6.749, c = 14.892 α = 79.664°, β = 80.113°, γ = 62.487 | 579.6 | 1.58 | Biaxial (-) n_{α} = 1.424 n_{β} = 1.436 n_{γ} = 1.438 2V: measured: 48° , calculated: 44° Max birefringence: δ = 0.014 | |
| Krasheninnikovite | KNa_{2}CaMg(SO_{4})_{3}F | 3:1 | hexagonal | P6_{3}/mcm | a = 16.6682 c = 6.9007 Z = 6 | 1660.36 | 2.68 | Uniaxial (-) n_{ω} = 1.500 n_{ε} = 1.492 Max birefringence: δ = 0.008 | |
| Shuvalovite | K_{2}(Ca_{2}Na)(SO_{4})_{3}F | 3:1 | orthorhombic | Pnma | a = 13.2383 b = 10.3023 c = 8.9909 Z = 4 | 1226.22 | 2.64 | biaxial (−), nα = 1.493 nβ = 1.498 nγ = 1.498 2V_{measured} ≤ 20 | |
| Thermessaite-(NH4) | (NH_{4})_{2}AlSO_{4}F_{3} | 1:3 | orthorhombic | Pbcn | a = 11.3005 b = 8.6125 c = 6.8501 Z = 4 | 666.69 | | | |

== Artificial ==
| name | formula | MW | ratio | system | space group | unit cell | volume | density | optical | CAS | references |
|---|---|---|---|---|---|---|---|---|---|---|---|
| | LiMgFSO_{4} | | 1:1 | triclinic | P1̅ | a = 5.1623 b = 5.388 c = 7.073 α = 106.68 β=107.40 and γ=97.50° Z=2 | | | | | |
| | NaMgSO_{4}F | | 1:1 | monoclinic | C2/c | Z=4 | 109.802 | 2.84 | | | |
| | Na_{2}AlSO_{4}F_{3} | | 1:1 | monoclinic | P2/c | a=6.3562 b=6.2899 c=7.1146 β=115.687° Z=2 | 256.33 | 2.928 | birefringence 0.0076@1064 nm | | |
| | Li_{4}NH_{4}Al(SO_{4})_{2}F_{4} | | 2:4 | monoclinic | C2/c | a=13.6561 b=4.9761 c=13.9919 β=92.135° Z=4 | 950.2 | 2.383 | birefringence 0.0068@1064 nm | | |
| | Na_{4}TiF_{4}(SO_{4})_{2} | | 2:4 | | | | | | | | |
| | β-K_{3}[SO_{4}]F | | 1:1 | tetragonal | I4/mcm | a= 7.2961 c= 10.854 | | | | | |
| | α-K_{3}[SO_{4}]F | | 1:1 | cubic | Pm3̅m | a≈5.43 ≥585 °C | | | | | |
| | KMgSO_{4}F | 178.47 | 1:1 | orthorhombic | Pna2_{1} | a=12.973 b=6.4585 c=10.635 Z=8 | 891.1 | 2.661 | colourless | | |
| | Li_{6}K_{3}Al(SO_{4})_{4}F_{4} | | 4:4 | triclinic | P1̅ | a=5.0304 b=9.5690 c=9.7078 α=70.968° β=75.531° γ=75.183° Z=1 | 420.08 | 2.554 | birefringence 0.0014@1064 nm | | |
| sodium calcium sulfapatite | Na_{6}Ca_{4}(SO_{4})_{6}F_{2} | | 6:2 | | | | | | | | |
| | K_{3}Ca_{2}(SO_{4})_{3}F | | 3:1 | orthorhombic | Pn2_{1}a | a=13.467 b=10.521 c=9.167 Z=4 | 1299.9 | | | | |
| | [N_{2}C_{10}H_{12}] TiF_{4}SO_{4} | 378.16? | 1:4 | triclinic | P1̅ | a=8.691 b=9.208 c=9.288 α=68.56 β=84.30 γ=81.59 Z=2 | 683.6 | 1.837 | colourless | | |
| | [N_{2}C_{10}H_{12}]TiF_{2}(SO_{4})_{2} | 436.22? | 2:2 | triclinic | P1̅ | a=4.5768 b=8.9162 c=10.1236 α=112.888 β=95.196 γ=98.706 Z=1 | 371.11 | 1.952 | colourless | | |
| | Rb_{2}TiF_{2}(SO_{4})_{2} · 2H_{2}O | | 1:1 | | | | | | | | |
| | Cs_{2}TiF_{2}(SO_{4})_{2} · 3H_{2}O | | 1:1 | | | | | | | | |
| | [N_{2}C_{6}H_{16}]V(SO_{4})_{2}F | 378.27 | 2:1 | monoclinic | P2_{1}/c | a=10.262 b =17.761 c=7.0518 β=93.93 Z=4 | 1282.3 | 1.959 | green | | |
| | Na_{2}VF_{3}SO_{4} | | 1:3 | | | | | | | | |
| | Na_{3}CrF_{2}(SO_{4})_{2} | | 2:2 | | | | | | | | |
| | LiMnSO_{4}F | | 1:1 | monoclinic | | a=13.2406 b=6.4082 c=10.0229 β=120.499 | 732.76 | | | | |
| | [N_{2}C_{6}H_{16}]^{2+}Mn_{2}F_{2}(SO_{4})_{2} | | 2:2 | | | | | | | | |
| | Li_{2}MnF_{3}(SO_{4}) | | 1:3 | | | | | | pink-brown | | |
| | (NH_{4})_{2}MnF_{3}(SO_{4}) | | 1:3 | | | | | | pink-brown | | |
| | Na_{2}MnF_{3}(SO_{4}) | | 1:3 | | | | | | pink-brown | | |
| Dipotassium trifluorosulfato manganate(III) | K_{2}MnF_{3}(SO_{4}) | | 1:3 | | | | | | pink-brown | | |
| | FeFSO_{4} | 170.91 | 1:1 | monoclinic | C2/c | a = 7.3037 b = 7.0753 c = 7.3117 β = 119.758° | 328.017 | 3.461 | | | |
| | K_{2}FeF_{3}SO_{4} | | 1:3 | | | | | | | | |
| | Li_{3}FeF_{2}(SO_{4})_{2}·H_{2}O | | 2:2 | | | | | | | | |
| | [N_{2}C_{6}H_{16}]Fe(SO_{4})_{2}F | 383.18 | 2:1 | monoclinic | P2_{1}/c | a=10.2220 b=17.6599 c=7.0437 β=93.894 Z=4 | 1268.59 | 2.006 | brown | | |
| | LiFeFSO_{4} | 177.85 | 1:1 | triclinic | P1̅ | a = 5.1751 b = 5.4915 c = 7.2211 α = 106.506° β = 107.178° γ=97.865° | 182.44 | 3.237 | grass green | | |
| sodium ferrous sulfate fluoride | NaFeFSO_{4} | 193.91 | 1:1 | monoclinic | P2_{1}/c | a = 6.6739 b = 8.6989 c = 7.1869 β = 113.525° | 382.567 | 3.366 | | | |
| sodium ferrous sulfate fluoride dihydrate | NaFeFSO_{4}·2H_{2}O | | 1:1 | monoclinic | P2_{1}/m | a=5.75959 b=7.38273 c=7.25047 β=113.3225 | 283.109 | | white | | |
| trisodium ferric disulfate difluoride | Na_{3}Fe(SO_{4})_{2}F_{2} | | 2:2 | orthorhombic | Pnca | a = 6.6419 b = 8.8115 c = 14.0023 | | | | | |
| | NaCoFSO_{4} | | 1:1 | monoclinic | C2/c | a=6.6687 b=8.6251 c=7.1444 β=114.323 | 374.46 | | | | |
| | NaCoFSO_{4}·2H_{2}O | | 1:1 | monoclinic | P2_{1}/m | a=5.73364 b=7.31498 c=7.18640 β=113.5028 | 276.40 | | pink | | |
| | NH_{4}CoFSO_{4}·2H_{2}O | | 1:1 | | | | | | | | |
| | KCoFSO_{4}·2H_{2}O | | 1:1 | | | | | | | | |
| | NaNiFSO_{4}·2H_{2}O | | 1:1 | monoclinic | P2_{1}/m | a=5.70118 b=7.27603 c=7.15634 β=113.8883 | 271.429 | | green | | |
| | LiZnSO_{4}F | | 1:1 | orthorhombic | Pnma | 7.40357 b=6.32995 c=7.42016 | 347.740 | | | | |
| | KZnSO_{4}F | 219.53 | 1:1 | orthorhombic | Pna2_{1} | a=13.0602 b=6.4913 c=10.7106 Z=8 | 908.02 | 3.212 | transparent <190 nm | | |
| | K_{2}Zn_{3}(SO_{4})(HSO_{4})_{2}F_{4} | | 1:4 | orthorhombic | Cmc2_{1} | a=17.725 b=7.6650 c=9.7505 Z=4 | 1324.7 | 3.212 | colourless | | |
| | Li_{4}RbAl(SO_{4})_{2}F_{4} | | 2:4 | monoclinic | C2/c | a=13.6503 b=4.984 c=14.0081 β=91.509° Z=4 | 948.82 | 2.858 | | | |
| | Y(SO_{4})F | 203.97 | 1:1 | orthorhombic | Pnma | a=8.3128, b=6.9255, c=6.3905 Z=4 | 367.90 | 3.682 | | | |
| | YSO_{4}F·H_{2}O | | 1:1 | monoclinic | P2_{1}/n | a=4.9707 b=7.306 c=11.493 β =96.95° | | | birefringence 0.0357 at 546 nm | | |
| | NH_{4}YSO_{4}F_{2} | | | monoclinic | P2_{1}/m | a=6.5872 b=5.8085 c=7.1958( β=114.652° Z=2 | 250.23 | 3.199 | | | |
| | Y_{2}Cu(OH)_{3}(SO_{4})_{2}F·H_{2}O | 521.52 | 2:1 | monoclinic | P2_{1}/n | a=11.6889, b=6.8660, c=12.5280, β=97.092° Z=4 | 997.8 | 3.472 | blue | | |
| | KYSO_{4}F_{2} | | 1:2 | monoclinic | P2_{1}/m | a=6.4402 b=5.7784 c=6.992 β=113.684° Z=2 | 238.30 | 3.652 | band gap 7.79 eV; birefringence 0.015 @ 546.1 nm | | |
| | RbYSO_{4}F_{2} | | 1:2 | monoclinic | P2_{1}/m | a=6.5347 b=5.8212 c=7.1383 β=114.332° Z=2 | 247.42 | 4.140 | band gap 7.82 eV; birefringence 0.02 @ 546.1 nm | | |
| | Zr_{2}O_{2}F_{2}SO_{4} · 6H_{2}O | | 1:2 | | | | | | | | |
| | α-K_{3}ZrF_{5}SO_{4} · H_{2}O | | 1:5 | | | | | | | | |
| | K_{2}ZrF_{4}SO_{4} | | 1:4 | | | | | | | | |
| | K_{2}ZrF_{2}(SO_{4})_{2} · 2.5H_{2}O | | 2:2 | | | | | | | | |
| | K_{3}Zr_{2}F_{9}SO_{4} · 2H_{2}O | | 1:9 | | | | | | | | |
| | (NH_{4})_{3}Zr_{2}F_{9}SO_{4} · 2H_{2}O | | 1:9 | | | | | | | | |
| | (NH_{4})_{2}ZrF_{4}SO_{4} | | 1:4 | | | | | | | | |
| | (NH_{4})_{2}ZrF_{2}(SO_{4})_{2} · 2.5H_{2}O | | 2:2 | | | | | | | | |
| | Rb_{2}ZrF_{4}SO_{4} | | 1:4 | | | | | | | | |
| | Rb_{2}ZrF_{2}(SO4)_{2} · 3H_{2}O | | 2:2 | | | | | | | | |
| | Rb_{3}Zr_{2}F_{9}SO_{4} ·2H_{2}O | | 1:9 | | | | | | | | |
| | RbZr_{2}O_{2}F(SO_{4})_{2} · 5H_{2}O | | 2:1 | | | | | | | | |
| | Cs_{2}ZrF_{4}SO_{4} | | 1:4 | | | | | | | | |
| | Cs_{2}ZrF_{2}(SO_{4})_{2} · 2H_{2}O | | 2:2 | | | | | | | | |
| | Cs_{8}Zr_{4}F_{2}(SO_{4})_{11} · 16H_{2}O | | 11:2 | | | | | | | | |
| | CsZr_{2}O_{2}F(SO_{4})_{2} · 6H_{2}O | | 2:1 | | | | | | | | |
| | Zr_{2}O_{2}F_{2}SO_{4} · 5H_{2}O | | 1:2 | | | | | | | | |
| triindium trifluoride sulfate ditellurite hydrate | In_{3}(SO_{4})(TeO_{3})_{2}F_{3}(H_{2}O) | 866.74 | 1:3 | orthorhombic | P2_{1}2_{1}2_{1} | a=8.3115 b=9.4341 c=14.8068 | 1161.0 | 4.959 | band gap 4.10 eV; white | | |
| 4,4'-bipyridine distannous difluoride disulfate | (C_{10}H_{10}N_{2})_{0.5}[SnF(SO_{4})] | | 2:2 | triclinic | P1̅ | a=4.726 b=7.935 c=11.203 α = 81.05° β = 87.59° γ=73.70° Z=2 | 398.3 | 2.608 | colourless | | |
| diantimony dipotassium hexafluoride sulfate | K_{2}SO_{4}·(SbF_{3})_{2} | 531.76 | 1:6 | monoclinic | P2_{1}/c | a=9.1962 b=5.6523 c=19.2354 β =103.209 Z=4 | 973.40 | 3.629 | colourless | | |
| diantimony dirubidium hexafluoride sulfate | Rb_{2}SO_{4}·(SbF_{3})_{2} | 624.50 | 1:6 | monoclinic | P2_{1} | a=9.405 b=5.7210 c=9.879 β = 103.850 Z=2 | 516.1 | 4.018 | colourless | | |
| tetraantimony hexarubidium dodecafluoride trisulfate | Rb_{6}Sb_{4}F_{12}(SO_{4})_{3} | 1515.989 | 3:12 | trigonal | P_{3} | a=16.9490 c=7.5405 Z=2 | 1875.94 | 4.026 | white | 53168-89-1 | |
| hexaammonium dodecafluorotrisulfatotetraantimonate(III) | [NH_{4}]_{6}Sb_{4}F_{12}(SO_{4})_{3} | | 3:12 | trigonal | P3 | a=17.07 c=7.515 Z=3 | 1896 | 2.92 | | | |
| hexarubidium dodecafluorotrisulfatotetraantimonate(III) | Rb_{6}Sb_{4}F_{12}(SO_{4})_{3} | | 3:12 | | | | | | | | |
| | Li_{4}CsAl(SO_{4})_{2}F_{4} | | 2:4 | monoclinic | C2/c | a=13.574 b=5.0427 c=14.258 β=91.961° Z=4 | 975.7 | 3.103 | | | |
| tetraantimony hexacaesium dodecafluoride trisulfate | Cs_{6}Sb_{4}F_{12}(SO_{4})_{3} | 1800.601 | 3:12 | triclinic | P1̅ | a=7.9044 b=10.5139 c=17.3534 al=90.350 β = 90.151 ga=104.797 Z=4 | 1394.3 | 4.289 | white | 53200-54-7 | |
| antimony caesium difluoride sulfate | CsSbF_{2}SO_{4} | 388.72 | 1:2 | orthorhombic | Pna2_{1} | a=9.9759 b=11.6616 c=5.2968 | 515.20 | 4.19 | clear, non-linear SH | | |
| | LiLa_{2}F_{3}(SO_{4})_{2} | | 2:3 | monoclinic | I2/a | a = 8.283, b = 6.947, c = 14.209 β = 95.30° Z=4 | | | | | |
| | CeF_{2}(SO_{4}) | | 1:2 | orthorhombic | Pca2_{1} | a=8.3668 b=6.3600 c=8.3862 | | | birefringence 0.361@ 546 nm; SHG 8×KDP | | |
| | NdFSO_{4}·H_{2}O | 277.32 | 1:1 | monoclinic | P2_{1}/n | a = 4.9948 b = 7.3684 c = 11.6366 β = 96.672° Z=4 | 425.37 | 4.330 | pink | | |
| | NaPr_{2}F_{3}(SO_{4})_{2} | | 2:3 | monoclinic | I2/a | a = 8.223, b = 6.9212, c = 14.199, β = 95.88° Z=4 | | | light green | | |
| | LiEr_{2}F_{3}(SO_{4})_{2} | | 2:3 | orthorhombic | Pbcn | a = 14.791, b = 6.336, c = 8.137 | | | | | |
| hexa(triethylenetriammonium) tetrasamarium tetradecasulfate difluoride | [C_{4}H_{16}N_{3}]_{6}[Sm_{4}F_{2}(SO_{4})_{14}] | 2621.43 | 14:2 | triclinic | P1̅ | a = 11.1988 b = 11.4073 c = 16.2666 α = 89.901°, β = 82.406°, γ = 67.757° Z=1 | 1903.9 | 2.286 | colourless | | |
| gadolinium fluoride sulfate | GdF[SO_{4}] | | 1:1 | orthorhombic | Pnma | a=8.436 b=7.0176 c=6.4338 Z=4 | | | | | |
| | TbFSO_{4} | | | orthorhombic | Pnma | a=8.3800 b=6.9863 c=6.4178 | | | | | |
| | TbFSO_{4}·H_{2}O | 292.00 | 1:1 | monoclinic | P2_{1}/n | a = 5.0014 b = 7.377 c = 11.651 β = 96.692° Z=4 | 426.9 | 4.543 | colourless | | |
| | DyFSO_{4} | | | orthorhombic | Pnma | a=8.3384 b=6.9576 c=6.3973 | | | | | |
| | DyFSO_{4}·H_{2}O | | 1:1 | monoclinic | P2_{1}/n | a=4.9849 b=7.3322 c=11.5662 β=96.827° | | | | | |
| | HoFSO_{4} | | | orthorhombic | Pnma | a=8.3123 b=6.9234 c=6.3768( | | | | | |
| | HoFSO_{4}·H_{2}O | | 1:1 | monoclinic | P2_{1}/n | a=4.9747 b=7.3113 c=11.5158 β=96.855° | | | | | |
| | γ-K_{2}HfF_{2}(SO_{4})_{2} · 2H_{2}O | | 2:2 | | | | | | | | |
| | K_{2}HfF_{2}(SO_{4})_{2} · 2.5H_{2}O | | 2:2 | | | | | | | | |
| | Na_{6}Pb_{4}(SO_{4})_{6}F_{2} | | 6:2 | | | | | | | | |
| | ThSO_{4}F_{2}.H_{2}O | | 1:2 | monoclinic | P2_{1}n | a = 6.9065 b = 6.9256 c = 10.589 β = 96.755° Z = 4 | 502.98 | | colourless | | |
| potassium catena-di—fluoro-difluorotetraoxo-di—sulphato-diuranate(VI) hydrate | K_{2}UF_{2}O_{2}(SO_{4})·H_{2}O | | 1:2 | monoclinic | P2_{1}/c | a = 9.263 b = 8.672 c = 11.019 β= 101.60° Z = 4 | 867.1 | 3.83 | greenish yellow | | |
| | (NH_{4})_{2}[UO_{2}F_{2}(SO_{4})] | | | triclinic | P1̅ | a=9.73 b=10.28 c=11.37 α = 107.4°, β = 111.9°, γ =106.9 Z=2 | | | greenish yellow | | |
| | (NH_{4})_{6}[(UO_{2})_{2}F_{4}(SO_{4})_{3}] | | | triclinic | P1 | a=9.35 b=9.85 c=11.25 α = 109.2°, β = 113.1°, γ =102.5 Z=1 | | | greenish yellow | | |
| | Cs_{2}[(UO_{2})_{2}F_{4}(SO_{4})] | | | | | | | | greenish yellow | | |
| | (NH_{4})[UO_{2}F(SO_{4})] | | | triclinic | P1 | a=8.99 b=7.12 c=7.42 α = 114.5°, β = 117.4°, γ =103.2 Z=1 | | 1.92 | greenish yellow | | |
| | RbUO_{2}SO_{4}F | | | orthorhombic | Pca2_{1} | a=25.353 b=6.735 c=11.496 Z=12 | | | | | |
| | [N_{2}C_{6}H_{16}][UO_{2}F_{2}(SO_{4})] | 520.29 | 1:2 | triclinic | P1̅ | a=6.9105 b=9.6605 =10.1033 α=72.6594(14) β=87.068 γ=77.9568 Z=2 | 629.62 | 2.744 | yellow | | |
| | [N_{2}C_{6}H_{16}][UO_{2}F(SO_{4})]_{2} | 884.37 | 2:2 | orthorhombic | Pmmn | a=6.9503 b=17.2147 c=7.0867 Z=2 | 847.90 | 3.464 | yellow | | |
| | [N_{2}C_{3}H_{12}][UO_{2}F(SO_{4})]_{2}·H_{2}O | 862.32 | 2:2 | orthorhombic | Pnma | a=13.5775 b=14.6180 c=8.1168 Z=4 | 1610.99 | 3.555 | yellow | | |
| | [N_{2}C_{5}H_{14}][UO_{2}F(H_{2}O)(SO_{4})]_{2} | 907.38 | 2:2 | monoclinic | P_{1}2_{1}/n_{1} | a=8.4354 b=15.5581 c=14.8442 β =96.666 Z=4 | 1935.0 | 3.115 | yellow | | |
| | [N_{2}C_{6}H_{18}]_{2}[UO_{2}F(SO_{4})]_{4}·H_{2}O | 1792.80 | 4:4 | triclinic | P1̅ | a=10.8832 b=10.9386 c=16.5325 α=75.6604 β=73.6101 γ=89.7726 Z=2 | 1824.73 | 3.263 | yellow | | |
| | [N_{2}C_{3}H_{12}][UO_{2}F(SO_{4})]_{2}·H_{2}O | 864.34 | 2:2 | monoclinic | P_{1}2_{1}/n_{1} | a=6.7745 b=8.1589 c=14.3661 β =94.556 Z=2 | 791.54 | 3.626 | yellow | | |
| diammonium hydrazinium triuranium(IV) tetrafluoride hexasulfate | U^{4+}_{3}F_{4}(SO_{4})_{6}·2NH_{4}·H_{3}N-NH_{3} | 1436.6 | 6:4 | monoclinic | C2/c | a=15.2309 b=8.77998 c=18.8590 β=105.5030 Z=4 | 2432.69 | 4.392 | green | | |
