= Bílinite =

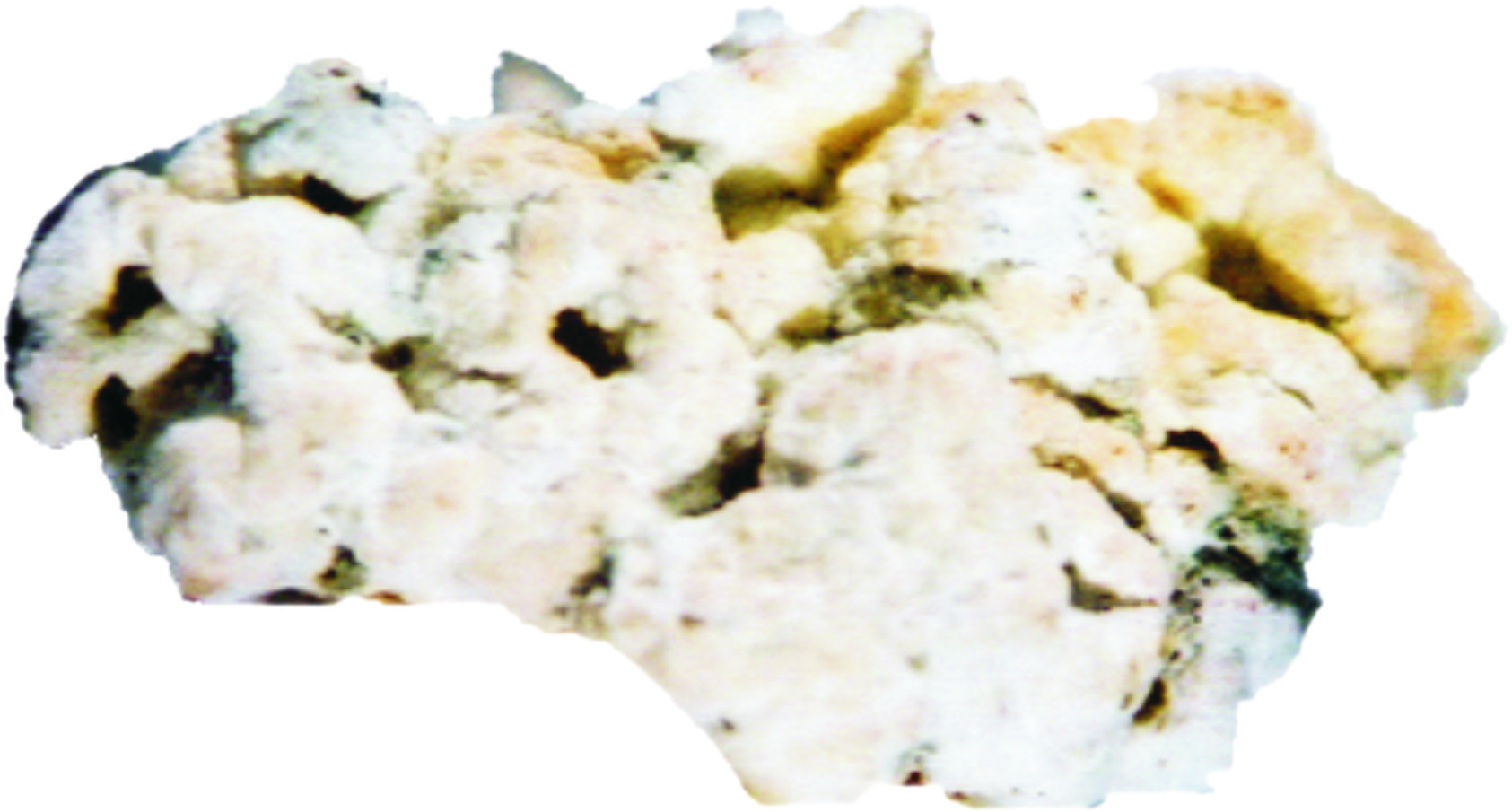

General
- Category: Sulfate mineral
- Formula: Fe^{2+}Fe^{3+}_{2}(SO_{4})_{4}·22H_{2}O
- IMA symbol: Bli
- Strunz classification: 7.CB.85
- Dana classification: 29.07.03.05
- Crystal system: Monoclinic
- Crystal class: Prismatic (2/m) (same H-M symbol)
- Space group: P2_{1}/c

Identification
- Color: White to yellowish
- Crystal habit: Fibrous in radial aggregates
- Mohs scale hardness: 2
- Luster: Vitreous - silky
- Streak: White
- Diaphaneity: Semitransparent
- Specific gravity: 1.87
- Optical properties: Biaxial (+/-)
- Refractive index: nα = 1.480 - 1.482 nβ = 1.500 nγ = 1.489 - 1.493
- Birefringence: δ = 0.009 - 0.011
- Solubility: Soluble in water

Bílinite (Fe^{2+}Fe_{2}^{3+}(SO_{4})_{4}·22H_{2}O) is an iron sulfate mineral. It is a product of the oxidation of pyrite in water. It is an acidic mineral that has a pH of less than 3 and is harmful to the environment when it comes from acid rock drainage (Keith et al., 2001).

Bílinite was first discovered near Bílina, Czech Republic which is why the mineral was named 'bílinite' (Palache, et al., 1969). This mineral possibly occurs on Mars.

== Composition ==
The weight percent oxide is as follows:

Oxide	Composition
SO_{3}	33.78
Fe_{2}O_{3}	16.84
FeO	7.58
H_{2}O	41.8
Total	100

== Related minerals ==
Related minerals to bílinite include jarosite, which is an iron sulfate salt, lepidocrocite, schwertmannite, ferricopiapite, and copiapite (Marion, et al., 2008).

== Special characteristics ==
Boulder Creek is a stream at Iron Mountain in Shasta County, California. The stream drains into the Sacramento River and San Francisco Bay. The water in this stream is contaminated from the mixture of the groundwater and surface streams due to mining. The pH is low and acidic due to the oxidation of pyrite in water. This results in the formation of sulfuric acid and bílinite (Keith, et al., 2001).
