= Uranopilite =

Minor ore of uranium

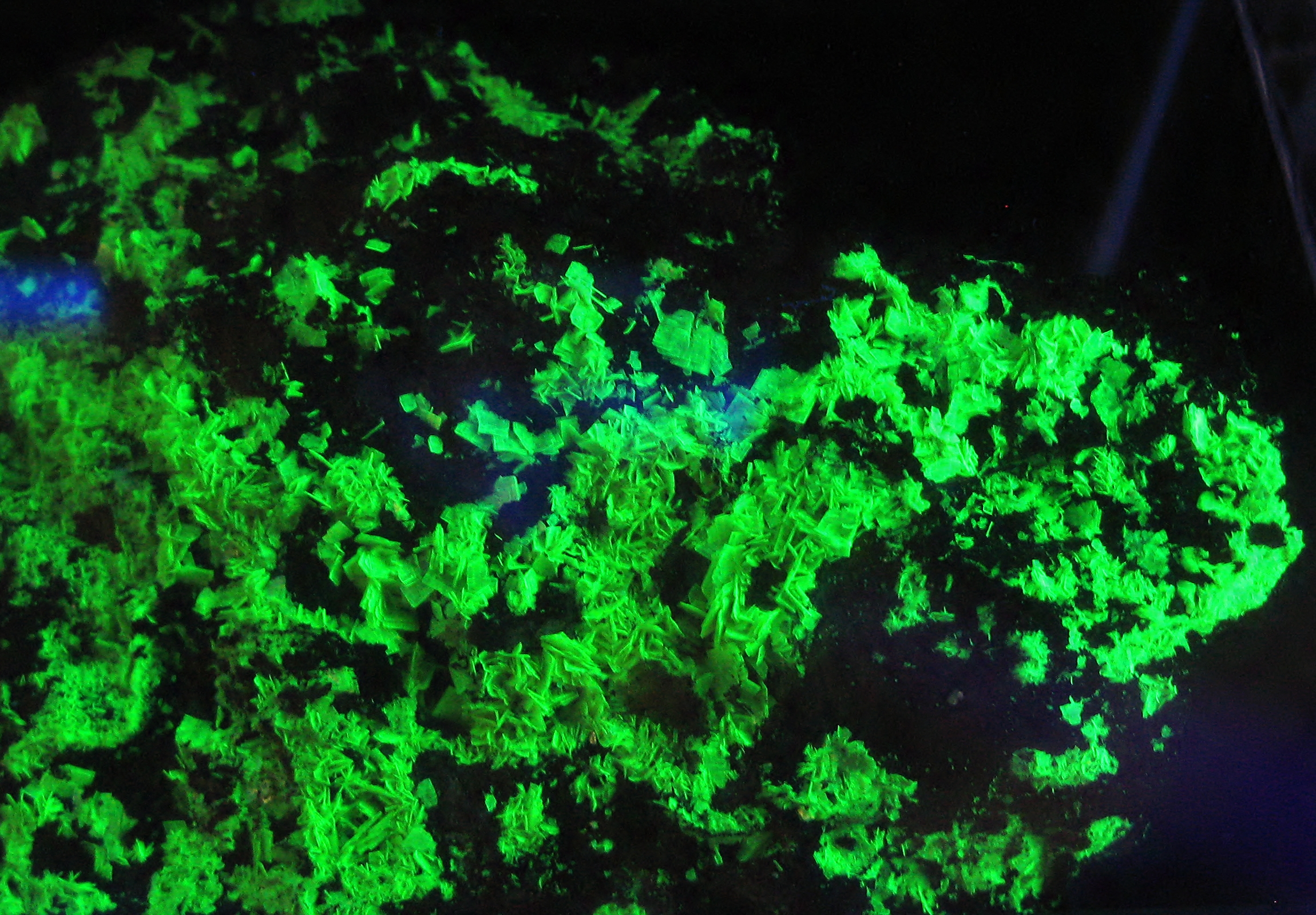
- Uranopilite with Fluorescence - Exposed in the Mineralogical Museum, Bonn, Germany

General
- Category: Sulfate minerals
- Formula: (UO_{2})_{6}SO_{4}(OH)_{6}O_{2}·14H_{2}O
- IMA symbol: Up
- Strunz classification: 7.EA.05
- Crystal system: Triclinic
- Crystal class: Pinacoidal (1̅) (same H-M symbol)
- Space group: P1̅

Identification
- Other characteristics: Radioactive

Uranopilite is a minor ore of uranium with the chemistry (UO_{2})_{6}SO_{4}(OH)_{6}O_{2}·14H_{2}O or, hydrated uranyl sulfate hydroxide.

As with many uranyl minerals, it is fluorescent and radioactive. It is straw yellow in normal light. Uranopilite fluoresces a bright green under ultraviolet light. Uranopilite contains clusters of six uranyl pentagonal bipyramids that share equatorial edges and vertices, with the clusters cross-linked to form chains by sharing vertices with sulfate tetrahedra. In uranopilite, the chains are linked directly by hydrogen bonds, as well as to interstitial H_{2}O groups.

Uranopilite is associated with other uranyl minerals such as zippeite and johannite and, like them, is usually found as an efflorescent crust in uranium mines.

Notable occurrences include:

- Wheal Owles, Cornwall, England
- San Juan County, Utah, US
- Northwest Territories, Canada
- Bohemian region of Europe

== See also ==
- Uranyl sulfate
- List of minerals
