= Lópezite =

Rare chromate mineral

- Synthetically produced lópezite

General
- Category: Sulfate minerals (chromate)
- Formula: K_{2}Cr_{2}O_{7}
- IMA symbol: Lpz
- Strunz classification: 7.FD.05
- Dana classification: 35.2.1.1 Anhydrous chromates
- Crystal system: Triclinic
- Crystal class: Pinacoidal (1̅) (same H-M symbol)
- Space group: P1̅

Identification
- Color: Orange-red, red
- Crystal habit: Granular or spherical in small crystals on the natural environment. Prismatic on lab grown crystals.
- Cleavage: Perfect [010] perfect, [100] distinct, [001] distinct
- Mohs scale hardness: 2 1/2
- Luster: Vitreous
- Streak: Light yellow
- Diaphaneity: Transparent
- Specific gravity: 2.69
- Pleochroism: Visible
- Solubility: soluble in water
- Other characteristics: Health risks: contains the carcinogenic and mutagenic chromate ion.

Lópezite is a rare, red, and carcinogenic chromate mineral with chemical formula: K_{2}Cr_{2}O_{7}. It crystallizes in the triclinic crystal system.

It occurs as rare vug fillings in nitrate ores in association with tarapacáite (K_{2}CrO_{4}), dietzeite and ulexite in the Chilean Atacama and is reported from the Bushveld igneous complex of South Africa. Lópezite was first described in 1937 for an occurrence in Iquique Province, Chile and named after Chilean mining engineer Emiliano López Saa (1871–1959).

Most commercially available lópezite is artificially produced. Synthetic varieties also exhibit monoclinic crystals.
