= Rapidcreekite =

Rare mineral

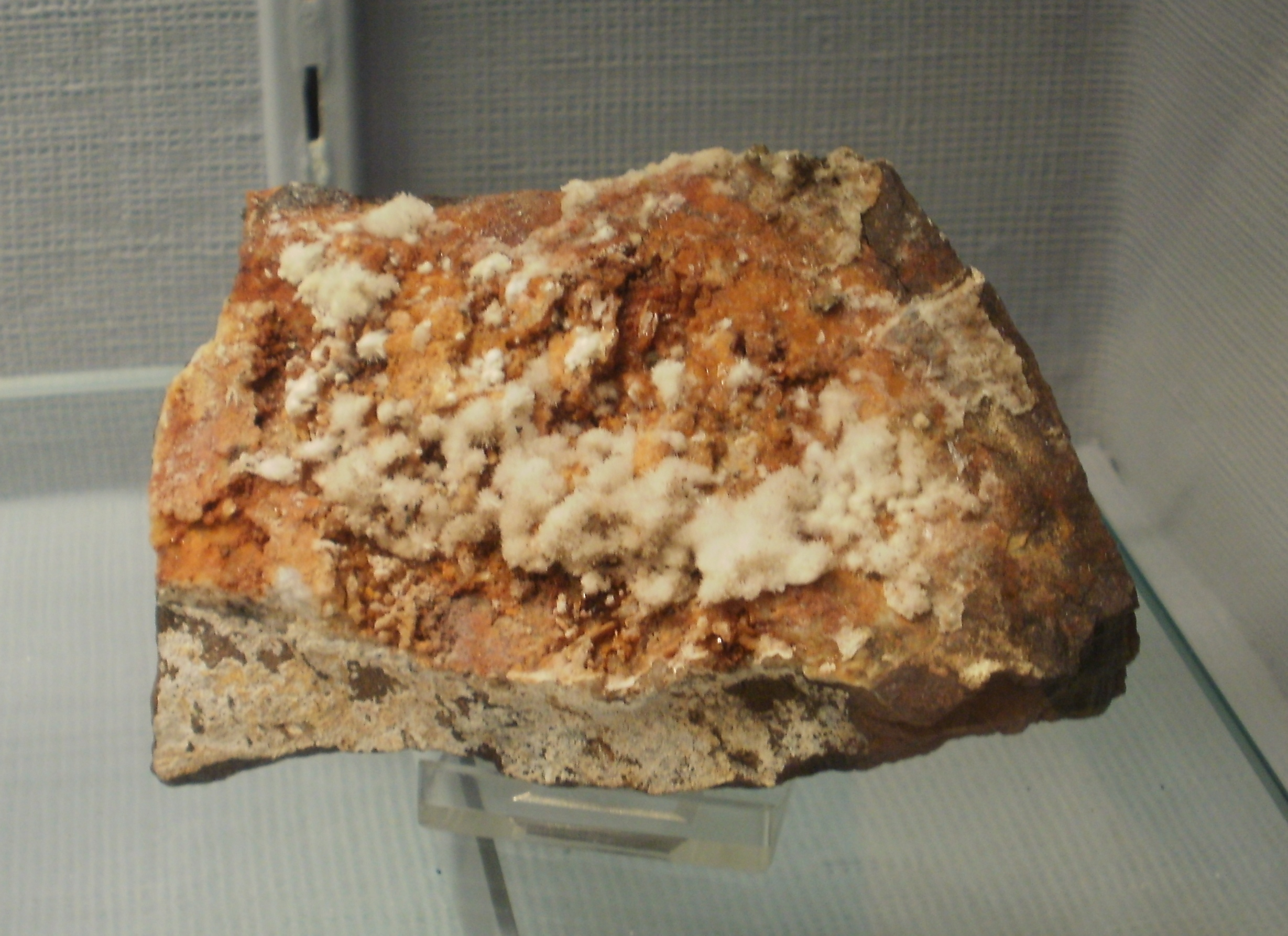
- Rapidcreekite from the Rapid Creek area, Yukon, Canada

General
- Category: Sulfate minerals Carbonate minerals
- Formula: Ca_{2}(SO_{4})(CO_{3})·4H_{2}O
- IMA symbol: Rck
- Strunz classification: 7.DG.20
- Dana classification: 32.2.1.1
- Crystal system: Orthorhombic
- Crystal class: Dipyramidal (mmm); H-M symbol: (2/m 2/m 2/m)
- Space group: Pcnb
- Unit cell: a = 15.517(2) Å b = 19.226(3) Å c = 6.1646(8) Å; Z = 8

Identification
- Color: White to colorless
- Crystal habit: Elongated, flattened to acicular crystals in radiating sprays or crust forming
- Cleavage: Perfect on {010} Good on {100}
- Fracture: Splintery
- Tenacity: Brittle
- Mohs scale hardness: 2
- Luster: Vitreous
- Streak: White
- Diaphaneity: Transparent
- Specific gravity: 2.239 (calculated)
- Optical properties: Biaxial (+)
- Refractive index: n_{α} = 1.516 n_{β} = 1.518 n_{γ} = 1.531
- Birefringence: δ = 0.015
- 2V angle: 45° (measured)
- Dispersion: None
- Ultraviolet fluorescence: Non-fluorescent
- Solubility: Dissolves slowly in 10% HCl

Rapidcreekite is a rare mineral with formula Ca_{2}(SO_{4})(CO_{3})·4H_{2}O. The mineral is white to colorless and occurs as groupings of acicular (needle-shaped) crystals. It was discovered in 1983 in northern Yukon, Canada, and described in 1986. Rapidcreekite is structurally and compositionally similar to gypsum.

== Description ==
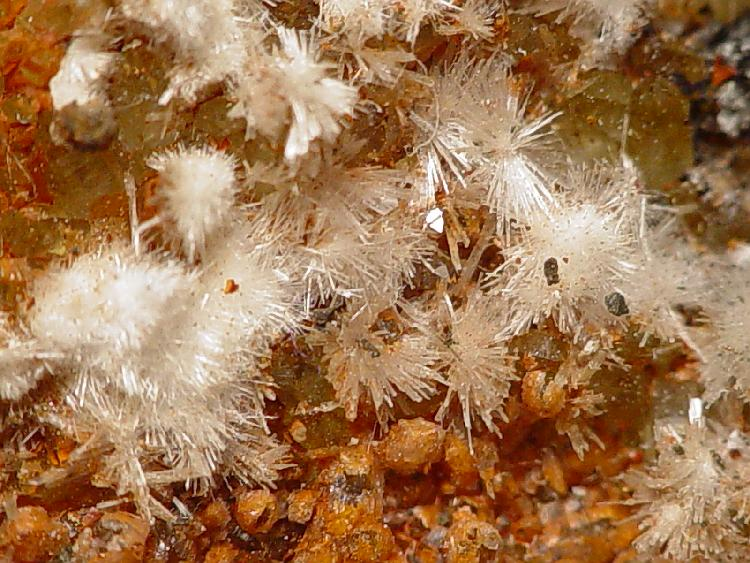
White crystals of rapidcreekite with quartz from the Rapid Creek area

Rapidcreekite is transparent and white to colorless. The mineral occurs as isolated clusters or pervasive crusts of radiating sprays of acicular crystals up to 3 mm (0.12 in) in length.

== Structure ==
In the structure of rapidcreekite, there are two distinct calcium sites coordinated by six oxygen anions and two H_{2}O groups arranged as a square antiprism. The sulfur site is tetrahedrally coordinated by oxygen anions and the carbon site is coordinated by a triangle of oxygen anions. The structural unit of rapidcreekite is a sheet that consists of edge-sharing CaΦ_{8} polyhedra (Φ, unspecified species: O or OH) cross-linked by carbonate and sulfate groups. Sheets are held together by weakening hydrogen bonds, accounting for the perfect cleavage along {100}.

The structure and composition of rapidcreekite is similar to that of gypsum. If half of the sulfate groups in gypsum were replaced by carbonate, the formula of rapidcreekite is obtained. If gypsum were transformed by twinning along alternate rows of sulfate groups and the resultant triangles of oxygen along the boundary occupied by carbon, the structure of rapidcreekite would result.

== History ==
Rapidcreekite was first encountered in 1983 in a tributary of Rapid Creek unofficially known as Crosscut Creek at 68°33′45″N 136°47′30″W in northern Yukon. The mineral was named rapidcreekite for the general area in which it was found. The mineral and name were approved by the IMA Commission on New Minerals and Mineral Names (IMA1984-035). Rapidcreekite was described in 1986 in the journal Canadian Mineralogist.

The holotype specimen, which consists of a few grams of rapidcreekite on a matrix, is held in the National Mineral Collection of the Geological Survey of Canada in Ottawa. Other specimens are held there and in the National Museum of Natural Sciences in Ottawa.

== Occurrence ==
Rapidcreekite occurs in association with aragonite, gypsum, and kulanite. It has been found in Canada, Germany, Norway, and Romania. The rare mineral occurs as a secondary phase that formed along the surfaces of joints and bedding planes in a quartz-rich sideritic formation. In the Rapid Creek area, the formation occurred in Albian ironstones and shales.
