= Argentojarosite =

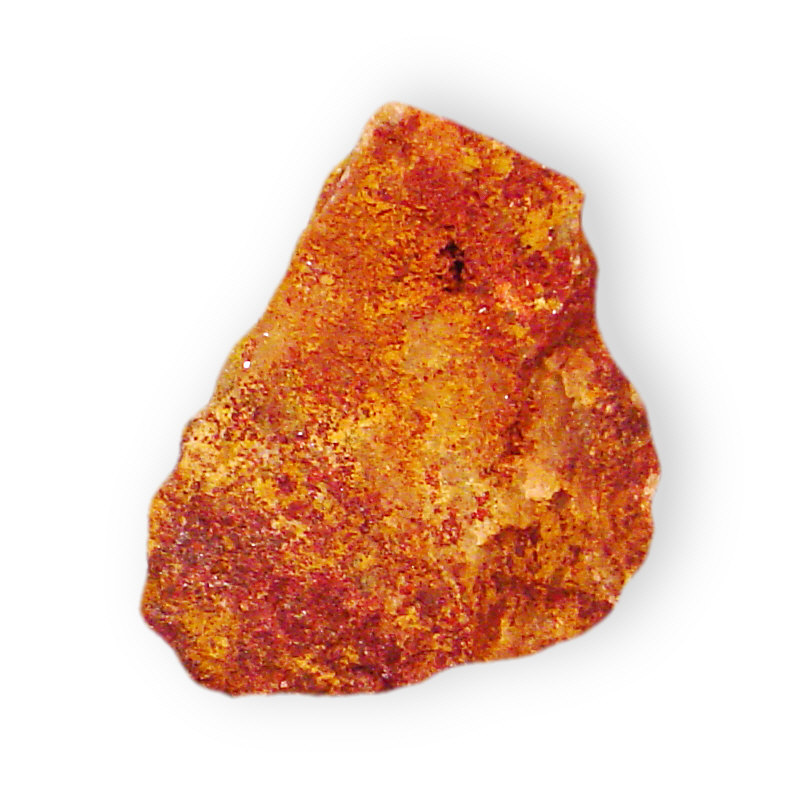
- Argentojarosite found in Sonora, Mexico

General
- Category: Sulfate mineral
- Formula: AgFe^{3+}_{3}(SO_{4})_{2}(OH)_{6}
- IMA symbol: Agjrs
- Strunz classification: 7.BC.10
- Dana classification: 30.2.5.5
- Crystal system: Trigonal
- Crystal class: Ditrigonal pyramidal (3m)
- Space group: R3m

Identification
- Color: Yellow, yellow-brown, brown
- Crystal habit: Coatings, fine-grained masses
- Cleavage: {0001} distinct
- Mohs scale hardness: 3.5-4.5
- Luster: Vitreous
- Streak: Light yellow
- Specific gravity: 3.66
- Density: 3.66 (measured), 3.81 (calculated)
- Optical properties: Uniaxial (-)
- Pleochroism: Dichroic, O: Yellow, E: Pale yellow

Argentojarosite is an iron sulfate mineral with the chemical formula AgFe^{3+}_{3}(SO_{4})_{2}(OH)_{6}. It is one of few iron sulfate minerals containing silver in its chemical formula as a dominant element. Its type locality is the East Tintic Mountains, Utah.

== Bibliography ==
- Palache, P.; Berman H.; Frondel, C. (1960). "Dana's System of Mineralogy, Volume II: Halides, Nitrates, Borates, Carbonates, Sulfates, Phosphates, Arsenates, Tungstates, Molybdates, Etc. (Seventh Edition)" John Wiley and Sons, Inc., New York, pp. 565.
