= Jôkokuite =

Sulfate mineral

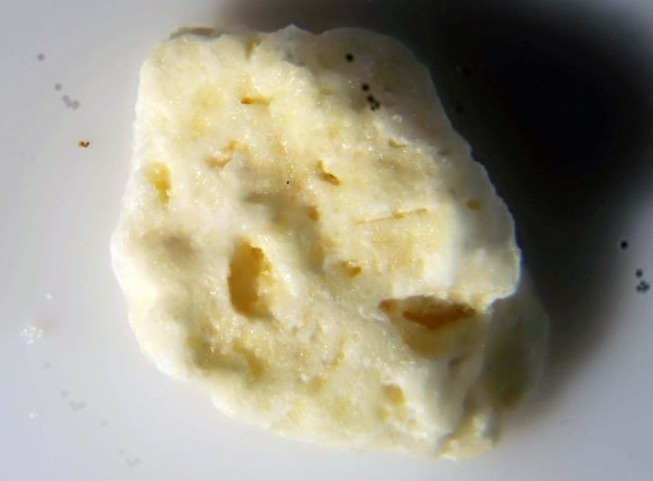
- Jôkokuite from Jokoku Mine, Hokkaido, Japan

General
- Category: Sulfate minerals
- Formula: MnSO_{4}・5H_{2}O
- IMA symbol: Jôk
- Strunz classification: 07.CB.20
- Dana classification: 29.6.7.4
- Crystal system: Triclinic
- Crystal class: Pinacoidal (1̅) (same H-M symbol)
- Space group: P1̅
- Unit cell: a = 6.37 Å b = 10.77 Å c = 6.13 Å

Identification
- Color: Pink, pale pink, light pink, white, colorless
- Cleavage: None
- Fracture: Conchoidal
- Mohs scale hardness: 2.5
- Luster: Vitreous
- Streak: White
- Diaphaneity: Transparent to translucent
- Specific gravity: 2.03
- Optical properties: Biaxial (−)
- Solubility: Soluble in water

Jôkokuite is a manganese sulfate mineral with chemical formula MnSO_{4}・5H_{2}O. It crystallizes in the triclinic crystal system. It was discovered in 1976 by Matsuo Nanbu at the Jokoku mine in Hokkaido, and is named after the location.
