= Gordaite =

Sulfate mineral

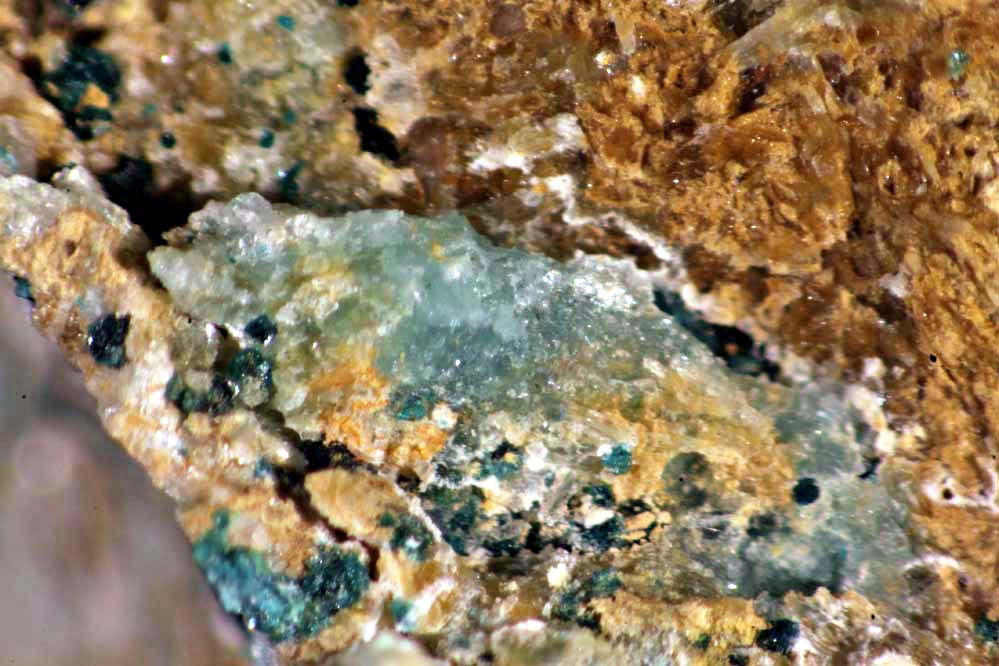
- Pale blue gordaite associated with deep green crystals of herbertsmithite from the San Francisco Mine, Caracoles, Antofagasta Region, Chile.

General
- Category: Sulfate mineral
- Formula: NaZn_{4}(SO_{4})(OH)_{6}Cl·6H_{2}O
- IMA symbol: Gda
- Strunz classification: 7.DF.50
- Crystal system: Trigonal
- Crystal class: Rhombohedral (3̅) (same H-M symbol)
- Space group: P3̅
- Unit cell: a = 8.413, c = 13.095 [Å]; Z = 2

Identification
- Color: Colorless to white, pale green with copper substitution
- Crystal habit: Thin tabular flakes or blades, in rosette aggregates
- Cleavage: Perfect on {0001}
- Tenacity: Flexible
- Mohs scale hardness: 2.5
- Luster: Vitreous to pearly
- Specific gravity: 2.627
- Optical properties: Uniaxial (-)
- Refractive index: n_{ω} = 1.561 n_{ε} = 1.538
- Birefringence: δ = 0.023

Gordaite is a sulfate mineral composed primarily of hydrous zinc sodium sulfate chloride hydroxide with formula: NaZn_{4}(SO_{4})(OH)_{6}Cl·6H_{2}O. It was named for the discovery location in the Sierra Gorda district of Chile. Gordaite forms as tabular trigonal crystals.

Gordaite first appeared after a research dive in September 1984 from the Juan de Fuca Ridge of the northeastern side of the Pacific Ocean. Gordaite was also described from weathered slag deposits as a result of copper smelting in Hettstedt, Germany. The mineral exhibits a hexagonal shape with clear or white (green if cuprian – Cu^{2+}) crystals ranging from planar to broad habit and has a point group of 3̅. Gordaite commonly occurs near minerals such as sphalerite, boleite and gypsum. The most recent finding occurred in the San Francisco mine in Chile where copper-zinc sulfide deposits were found.

== Composition ==
The 1998 Nasdala article examines the ALV 1457-5R sample found on the sea floor of the Juan de Fuca Ridge. The sample itself was taken from a sulfide chimney with mass of about 2.5 kg. The chimney was composed of about 98% permeable sulfides and 2% sulfates. The sulfides were primarily composed of iron sulfides such as pyrite and sphalerite and were present in the core of the chimney. The sulfate portions were found in concentric layers on the outside of the sample, alternating between [Zn_{4}(OH)_{6}(SO_{4})Cl]- and [Na(H_{2}O)_{6}]- interlayers.

Table 1: Chemical Composition of the Gordaite Mineral

Compound	1) Na_{1.54}Zn_{3.39}(SO_{4})_{1.00} (OH)_{6}Cl_{0.95}∙6H_{2}O	2) NaZn_{4}(SO_{4}) (OH)_{6}Cl∙H_{2}O.
SO_{3}	15.33	12.79
ZnO	52.85	51.99
Na_{2}O	9.15	4.95
Cl	6.46	5.66
H_{2}O	12.33	25.89
-O = Cl_{2}	1.46	1.28
Total	94.66	100.00

  - (1) San Francisco mine, Chile; by electron microprobe, H_{2}O by CHN analyzer; low analytical total due to loss of H_{2}O during grinding, Na too high due to peak overlaps with Zn; after adjusting Na_{2}O to 5.5% from AA, and partitioning H between H_{2}O and (OH)- according to crystal-structure analysis, corresponds to Na_{1.54}Zn_{3.39}(S0_{4})(OH)_{6}Cl_{0.95}·6H_{2}0.
  - (2) NaZn_{4}(SO_{4})(OH)_{6}Cl·6H_{2}0.

Table 1 is taken from a study done based on the findings in the San Francisco mine. Section 1 displays the results based from an electron microprobe test which resulted in loss of water. Section 2 displays the normalized results taken from crystal structure analysis.

Recognition of gordaite crystals is problematic due to its association with tabular baryte. Based on the findings of the dive at Juan de Fuca Ridge, gordaite was formed due to the reaction of discharging hydrothermal fluids with sea water. The overwhelming presence of baryte crystals confirms the idea that gordaite must be more than a byproduct of weathering.

== Structure ==
The gordaite mineral from Juan de Fuca has a trigonal crystal structure and its formula is Zn_{4}Na(OH)_{6}(SO_{4})Cl·6H_{2}O. Utilizing electron microprobe analysis to define gordaite’s chemical composition is difficult because of its intricate chemical layering. According to the study done using the Philips XL 30 SEM (scanning electron microscope), the analysis of sodium could not be completed because the lines of zinc (Zn-Lα) were so intense that they overlapped the Na-K lines. The sample from Germany is a trigonal structure with lattice perimeters: a = 8.364 Å and c = 13.046 Å respectively. Gordaite contains octahedra with edges that share CDI2 – like sheets and have Zn^{2+} ions in their centers, where five hydroxide ions coordinate the zinc ions. Throughout the sulfate groups are connected to octahedral sheets. Sodium ions lie between the layers in order to make up for the negative charges and are coordinated by six water molecules.

== Physical properties ==
Gordaite belongs to the point group P3̅. This indicates that the mineral has a primitive lattice and belongs to the hexagonal/trigonal point group. Gordaite crystals are typically white or opaque and can sometimes exhibit a greenish color if trace copper is present. The crystals are broad and flat and have a vitreous luster. The mineral shows a cleavage plain parallel to {0001}, is flexible and has a Mohs hardness of about 2.5. The measured specific gravity is about 2.627 whereas the calculated value is about 2.640. Its crystallographic axes are a = 8.3556 and c = 13.025 angstroms, similar to that is the sample from Germany.

== Geologic occurrences ==
Gordaite has appeared in oxidized deposits of Cu-Zn sulfide in the mines of San Francisco, Chile. Deposits have also been found on the eroded mine dumps in Hettstedt and Helbra Germany. The most notable incidence occurred on the sea floor of the Juan de Fuca Ridge. This occurrence is important because it shows the reaction of ocean water with hydrothermal fluids in the exterior oxidized portions of the chimney.

Gordaite was named after the Sierra Gorda District of the Tocopilla Province of the Antofagasta region of Chile where it has been reported from the San Francisco mines and other locations. It was approved by the International Mineralogical Association in 1996. Gordaite has since been reported from mine dumps in Germany and the Juan de Fuca Ridge.
