= Xocolatlite =

Hydrous Te(VI) oxysalt mineral

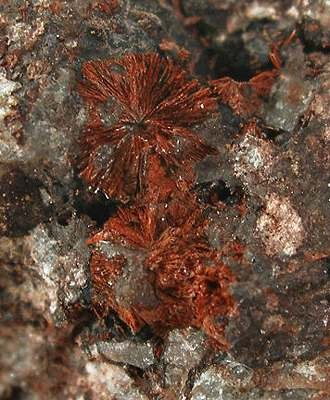
- Moctezuma Mine, Moctezuma, Municipio de Moctezuma, Sonora, Mexico

General
- Category: Sulfate minerals
- Formula: Ca_{2}Mn^{4+}_{2}(Te^{6+}O_{6})_{2} · H_{2}O
- IMA symbol: Xoc
- Strunz classification: 7.DF.85
- Crystal system: Monoclinic
- Crystal class: Prismatic (2/m) (same H-M symbol)
- Space group: P2/m

Identification
- Formula mass: 655.24 g/mol
- Color: Chocolate brown
- Crystal habit: Encrustations; Micaceous
- Fracture: Conchoidal
- Mohs scale hardness: 2-3
- Luster: Vitreous
- Streak: Copper brown
- Diaphaneity: Transparent
- Specific gravity: 4.10 g/cc
- Density: 4.1 g/cc

Xocolatlite is a sulfate mineral named for its chocolatey appearance. Discovered in the La Bambolla gold mine of Moctezuma, Sonora, Mexico, Xocolatlite's name is derived from the Nahuatl word xocolatl (literally "bitter water"; a root word of "chocolate"), a drink made from cocoa, water, and chili.
