= Aluminocopiapite =

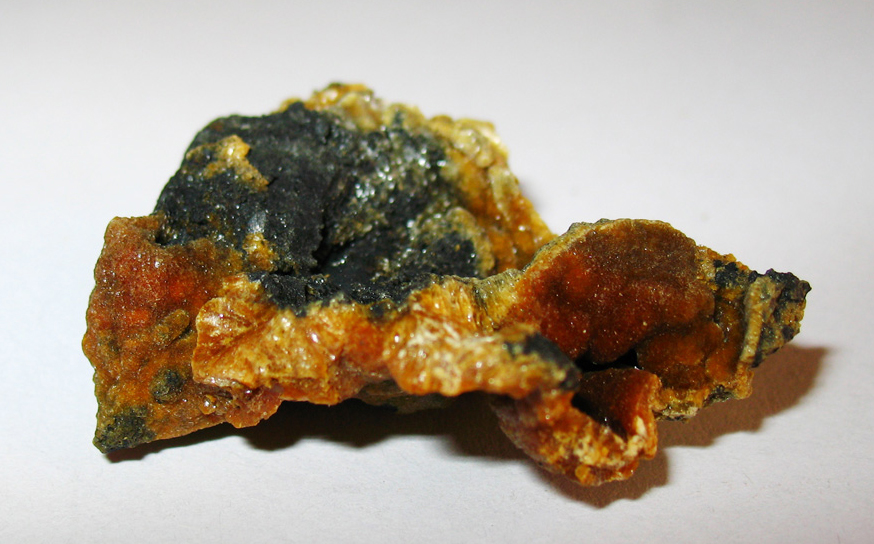
- Aluminocopiapite found in Spain

General
- Category: Minerals
- Formula: Al_{2/3}Fe^{3+}_{4}(SO_{4})_{6}(OH)_{2}·20H_{2}O
- IMA symbol: Acpi

Identification
- Color: Pale lemon-yellow to deep yellow
- Tenacity: Fragile
- Mohs scale hardness: 2-3
- Luster: Vitreous
- Diaphaneity: Transparent, Translucent
- Specific gravity: 2.163

Aluminocopiapite (IMA symbol: Acpi) is an aluminium iron sulfate mineral with the chemical formula Al_{2/3}Fe^{3+}_{4}(SO_{4})_{6}(OH)_{2}·20H_{2}O. Its type localities are Fortymile River in Alaska and the San Rafael Swell in Utah. The mineral is named after the city of Copiapó in Chile.
