= Sulfate mineral =

Class of minerals that include the sulfate ion

The sulfate minerals are a class of minerals that include the sulfate ion (SO^{2−}_{4}) within their structure. The sulfate minerals occur commonly in primary evaporite depositional environments, as gangue minerals in hydrothermal veins and as secondary minerals in the oxidizing zone of sulfide mineral deposits. The chromate and manganate minerals have a similar structure and are often included with the sulfates in mineral classification systems.

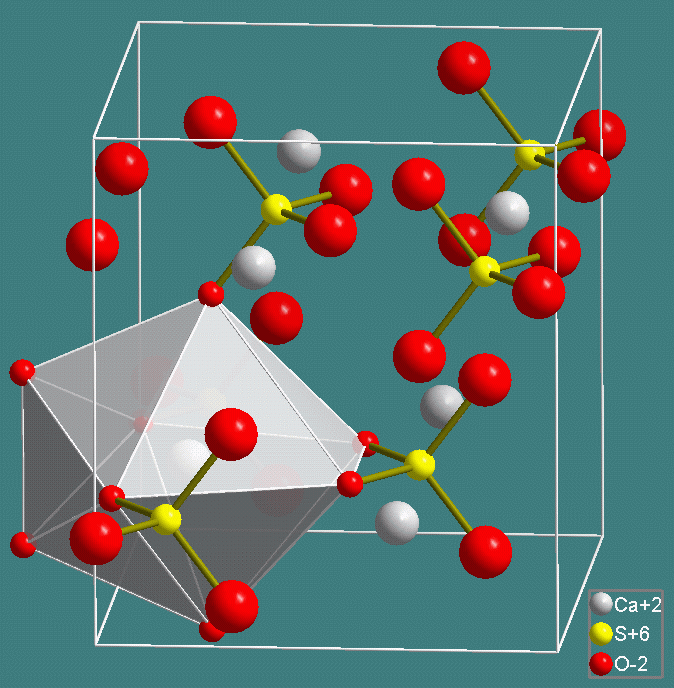
Anhydrite crystal structure

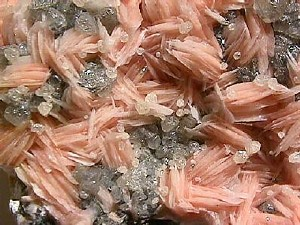
Barite with cerussite

Sulfate minerals include:

- Anhydrous sulfates
  - Barite BaSO_{4}
  - Celestine SrSO_{4}
  - Anglesite PbSO_{4}
  - Anhydrite CaSO_{4}
  - Hanksite Na_{22}K(SO_{4})_{9}(CO_{3})_{2}Cl
- Hydroxide and hydrous sulfates
  - Gypsum CaSO_{4}·2H_{2}O
  - Chalcanthite CuSO_{4}·5H_{2}O
  - Kieserite MgSO_{4}·H_{2}O
  - Starkeyite MgSO_{4}·4H_{2}O
  - Hexahydrite MgSO_{4}·6H_{2}O
  - Epsomite MgSO_{4}·7H_{2}O
  - Meridianiite MgSO_{4}·11H_{2}O
  - Melanterite FeSO_{4}·7H_{2}O
  - Antlerite Cu_{3}SO_{4}(OH)_{4}
  - Brochantite Cu_{4}SO_{4}(OH)_{6}
  - Alunite KAl_{3}(SO_{4})_{2}(OH)_{6}
  - Jarosite KFe_{3}(SO_{4})_{2}(OH)_{6}
  - Löweite Na_{12}Mg_{7}(SO_{4})_{13}·15H_{2}O

== Nickel–Strunz classification -07- sulfates ==
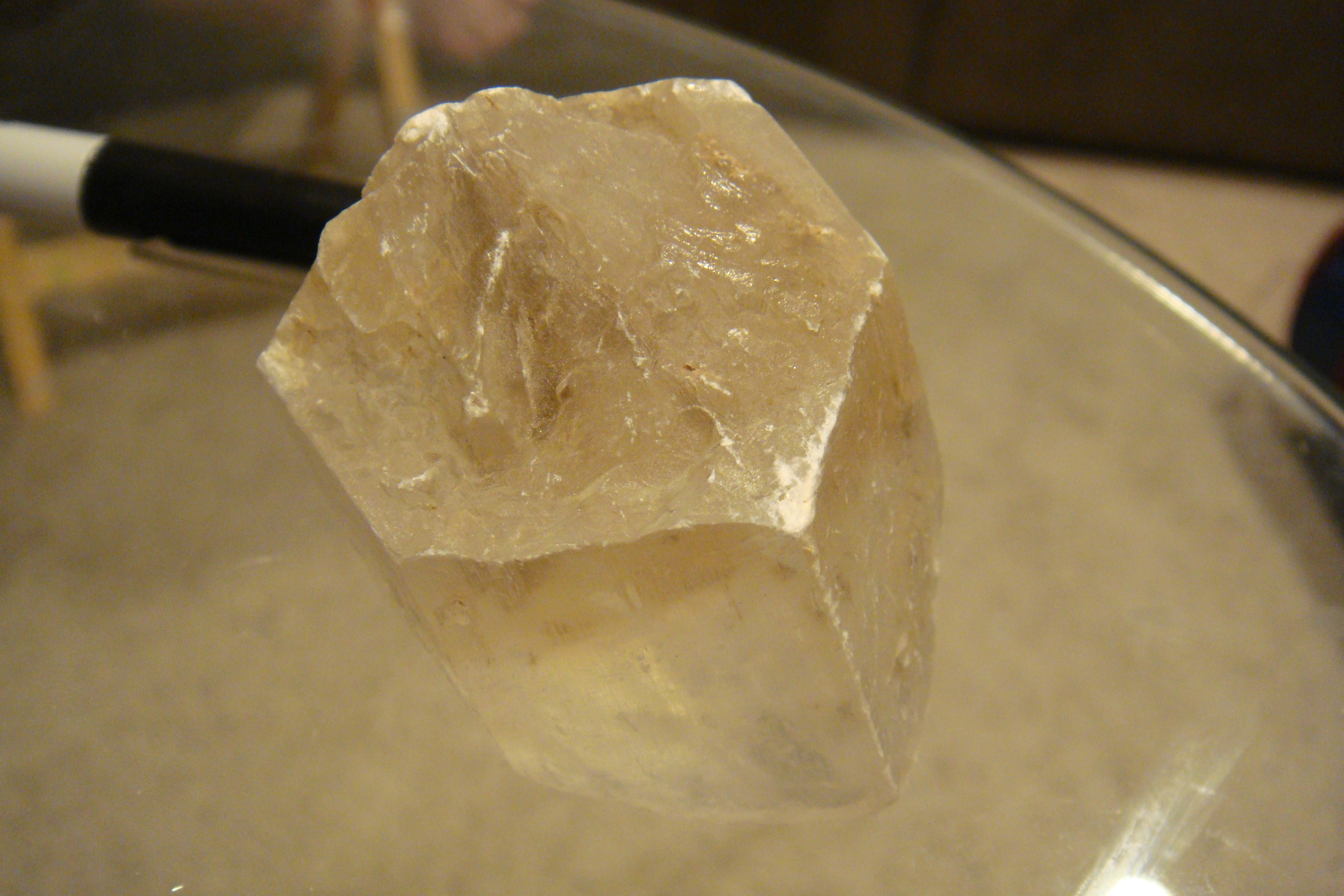
Hanksite, one of the rare minerals that is a sulfate and carbonate

IMA-CNMNC proposes a new hierarchical scheme (Mills et al., 2009). This list uses it to modify the Classification of Nickel–Strunz (mindat.org, 10 ed, pending publication).

- Abbreviations:
  - "*" – discredited (IMA/CNMNC status).
  - "?" – questionable/doubtful (IMA/CNMNC status).
  - "REE" – Rare-earth element (Sc, Y, La, Ce, Pr, Nd, Pm, Sm, Eu, Gd, Tb, Dy, Ho, Er, Tm, Yb, Lu)
  - "PGE" – Platinum-group element (Ru, Rh, Pd, Os, Ir, Pt)
  - 03.C Aluminofluorides, 06 Borates, 08 Vanadates (04.H V^{[5,6]} Vanadates), 09 Silicates:
    - Neso: insular (from Greek νησος nēsos, island)
    - Soro: grouping (from Greek σωροῦ sōros, heap, mound (especially of corn))
    - Cyclo: ring
    - Ino: chain (from Greek ις [genitive: ινος inos], fibre)
    - Phyllo: sheet (from Greek φύλλον phyllon, leaf)
    - Tekto: three-dimensional framework
- Nickel–Strunz code scheme: NN.XY.##x
  - NN: Nickel–Strunz mineral class number
  - X: Nickel–Strunz mineral division letter
  - Y: Nickel–Strunz mineral family letter
  - ##x: Nickel–Strunz mineral/group number, x add-on letter

=== Class: sulfates, selenates, tellurates ===
- 07.A Sulfates (selenates, etc.) without Additional Anions, without H_{2}O
  - 07.AB With medium-sized cations: 05 Millosevichite, 05 Mikasaite; 10 Chalcocyanite, 10 Zincosite*
  - 07.AC With medium-sized and large cations: IMA2008-029, 05 Vanthoffite; 10 Efremovite, 10 Manganolangbeinite, 10 Langbeinite; 15 Eldfellite, 15 Yavapaiite; 20 Godovikovite, 20 Sabieite; 25 Thenardite, 35 Aphthitalite
  - 07.AD With only large cations: 05 Arcanite, 05 Mascagnite; 10 Mercallite, 15 Misenite, 20 Letovicite, 25 Glauberite, 30 Anhydrite; 35 Anglesite, 35 Barite, 35 Celestine, 35 Radiobarite*, 35 Olsacherite; 40 Kalistrontite, 40 Palmierite
- 07.B Sulfates (selenates, etc.) with additional anions, without H_{2}O
  - 07.BB With medium-sized cations: 05 Caminite, 10 Hauckite, 15 Antlerite, 20 Dolerophanite, 25 Brochantite, 30 Vergasovaite, 35 Klebelsbergite, 40 Schuetteite, 45 Paraotwayite, 50 Xocomecatlite, 55 Pauflerite
  - 07.BC With medium-sized and large cations: 05 Dansite; 10 Alunite, 10 Ammonioalunite, 10 Ammoniojarosite, 10 Beaverite, 10 Argentojarosite, 10 Huangite, 10 Dorallcharite, 10 Jarosite, 10 Hydroniumjarosite, 10 Minamiite, 10 Natrojarosite, 10 Natroalunite, 10 Osarizawaite, 10 Plumbojarosite, 10 Walthierite, 10 Schlossmacherite; 15 Yeelimite; 20 Atlasovite, 20 Nabokoite; 25 Chlorothionite; 30 Fedotovite, 30 Euchlorine; 35 Kamchatkite, 40 Piypite; 45 Klyuchevskite-Duplicate, 45 Klyuchevskite, 45 Alumoklyuchevskite; 50 Caledonite, 55 Wherryite, 60 Mammothite; 65 Munakataite, 65 Schmiederite, 65 Linarite; 70 Chenite, 75 Krivovichevite
  - 07.BD With only large cations: 05 Sulphohalite; 10 Galeite, 10 Schairerite; 15 Kogarkoite; 20 Cesanite, 20 Caracolite; 25 Burkeite, 30 Hanksite, 35 Cannonite, 40 Lanarkite, 45 Grandreefite, 50 Itoite, 55 Chiluite, 60 Hectorfloresite, 65 Pseudograndreefite, 70 Sundiusite
- 07.C Sulfates (selenates, etc.) without additional anions, with H_{2}O
  - 07.CB With only medium-sized cations: 05 Gunningite, 05 Dwornikite, 05 Kieserite, 05 Szomolnokite, 05 Szmikite, 05 Poitevinite, 05 Cobaltkieserite; 07 Sanderite, 10 Bonattite, 15 Boyleite, 15 Aplowite, 15 Ilesite, 15 Rozenite, 15 Starkeyite, 15 IMA2002-034; 20 Chalcanthite, 20 Jokokuite, 20 Pentahydrite, 20 Siderotil; 25 Bianchite, 25 Ferrohexahydrite, 25 Chvaleticeite, 25 Hexahydrite, 25 Moorhouseite, 25 Nickelhexahydrite; 30 Retgersite; 35 Bieberite, 35 Boothite, 35 Mallardite, 35 Melanterite, 35 Zincmelanterite, 35 Alpersite; 40 Epsomite, 40 Goslarite, 40 Morenosite; 45 Alunogen, 45 Meta-alunogen; 50 Coquimbite, 50 Paracoquimbite; 55 Rhomboclase, 60 Kornelite, 65 Quenstedtite, 70 Lausenite; 75 Lishizhenite, 75 Romerite; 80 Ransomite; 85 Bilinite, 85 Apjohnite, 85 Dietrichite, 85 Halotrichite, 85 Pickeringite, 85 Redingtonite, 85 Wupatkiite; 90 Meridianiite, 95 Caichengyunite
  - 07.CC With medium-sized and large cations: 05 Krausite, 10 Tamarugite; 15 Mendozite, 15 Kalinite; 20 Lonecreekite, 20 Alum-(K), 20 Alum-(Na), 20 Lanmuchangite, 20 Tschermigite; 25 Pertlikite, 25 Monsmedite?, 25 Voltaite, 25 Zincovoltaite; 30 Krohnkite, 35 Ferrinatrite, 40 Goldichite, 45 Loweite; 50 Blodite, 50 Changoite, 50 Nickelblodite; 55 Mereiterite, 55 Leonite; 60 Boussingaultite, 60 Cyanochroite, 60 Mohrite, 60 Picromerite, 60 Nickelboussingaultite; 65 Polyhalite; 70 Leightonite, 75 Amarillite, 80 Konyaite, 85 Wattevilleite
  - 07.CD With only large cations: 05 Matteuccite, 10 Mirabilite, 15 Lecontite, 20 Hydroglauberite, 25 Eugsterite, 30 Gorgeyite; 35 Koktaite, 35 Syngenite; 40 Gypsum, 45 Bassanite, 50 Zircosulfate, 55 Schieffelinite, 60 Montanite, 65 Omongwaite
- 07.D Sulfates (selenates, etc.) with additional anions, with H_{2}O
  - 07.DB With only medium-sized cations; insular octahedra and finite groups: 05 Svyazhinite, 05 Aubertite, 05 Magnesioaubertite; 10 Rostite, 10 Khademite; 15 Jurbanite; 20 Minasragrite, 20 Anorthominasragrite, 20 Orthominasragrite; 25 Bobjonesite; 30 Amarantite, 30 Hohmannite, 30 Metahohmannite; 35 Aluminocopiapite, 35 Copiapite, 35 Calciocopiapite, 35 Cuprocopiapite, 35 Ferricopiapite, 35 Magnesiocopiapite, 35 Zincocopiapite
  - 07.DC With only medium-sized cations; chains of corner-sharing octahedra: 05 Aluminite, 05 Meta-aluminite; 10 Butlerite, 10 Parabutlerite; 15 Fibroferrite, 20 Xitieshanite; 25 Botryogen, 25 Zincobotryogen; 30 Chaidamuite, 30 Guildite
  - 07.DD With only medium-sized cations; sheets of edge-sharing octahedra: 05 Basaluminite?, 05 Felsobanyaite, 07.5 Kyrgyzstanite, 08.0 Zn-Schulenbergite; 10 Langite, 10 Posnjakite, 10 Wroewolfeite; 15 Spangolite, 20 Ktenasite, 25 Christelite; 30 Campigliaite, 30 Devilline, 30 Orthoserpierite, 30 Niedermayrite, 30 Serpierite; 35 Motukoreaite, 35 Mountkeithite, 35 Glaucocerinite, 35 Honessite, 35 Hydrowoodwardite, 35 Hydrohonessite, 35 Shigaite, 35 Natroglaucocerinite, 35 Wermlandite, 35 Nikischerite, 35 Zincaluminite, 35 Woodwardite, 35 Carrboydite, 35 Zincowoodwardite, 35 Zincowoodwardite-3R, 35 Zincowoodwardite-1T; 40 Lawsonbauerite, 40 Torreyite, 45 Mooreite, 50 Namuwite, 55 Bechererite, 60 Ramsbeckite, 65 Vonbezingite, 70 Redgillite; 75 Chalcoalumite, 75 Nickelalumite*; 80 Guarinoite, 80 Theresemagnanite, 80 Schulenbergite; 85 Montetrisaite
  - 07.DE With only medium-sized cations; unclassified: 05 Mangazeite; 10 Carbonatecyanotrichite, 10 Cyanotrichite; 15 Schwertmannite, 20 Tlalocite, 25 Utahite, 35 Coquandite, 40 Osakaite, 45 Wilcoxite, 50 Stanleyite, 55 Mcalpineite, 60 Hydrobasaluminite, 65 Zaherite, 70 Lautenthalite, 75 Camérolaite, 80 Brumadoite
  - 07.DF With large and medium-sized cations: 05 Uklonskovite, 10 Kainite, 15 Natrochalcite; 20 Metasideronatrite, 20 Sideronatrite; 25 Despujolsite, 25 Fleischerite, 25 Schaurteite, 25 Mallestigite; 30 Slavikite, 35 Metavoltine; 40 Lannonite, 40 Vlodavetsite; 45 Peretaite, 50 Gordaite, 55 Clairite, 60 Arzrunite, 65 Elyite, 70 Yecoraite, 75 Riomarinaite, 80 Dukeite, 85 Xocolatlite
  - 07.DG With large and medium-sized cations; with NO_{3}, CO_{3}, B(OH)_{4}, SiO_{4} or IO_{3}: 05 Darapskite; 10 Clinoungemachite, 10 Ungemachite, 10 Humberstonite; 15 Bentorite, 15 Charlesite, 15 Ettringite, 15 Jouravskite, 15 Sturmanite, 15 Thaumasite, 15 Carraraite, 15 Buryatite; 20 Rapidcreekite, 25 Tatarskite, 30 Nakauriite, 35 Chessexite; 40 Carlosruizite, 40 Fuenzalidaite; 45 Chelyabinskite*
- 07.E Uranyl Sulfates
  - 07.EA Without cations: 05 Uranopilite, 05 Metauranopilite, 10 Jachymovite
  - 07.EB With medium-sized cations: 05 Johannite, 10 Deliensite
  - 07.EC With medium-sized and large cations: 05 Cobaltzippeite, 05 Magnesiozippeite, 05 Nickelzippeite, 05 Natrozippeite, 05 Zinc-zippeite, 05 Zippeite; 10 Rabejacite, 15 Marecottite, 20 Pseudojohannite
- 07.J Thiosulfates
  - 07.JA Thiosulfates with Pb: 05 Sidpietersite
- 07.X Unclassified Strunz Sulfates (Selenates, Tellurates)
  - 07.XX Unknown: 00 Aiolosite, 00 Steverustite, 00 Grandviewite, 00 IMA2009-008, 00 Adranosite, 00 Blakeite

=== Class: chromates ===
- 07.F Chromates
  - 07.FA Without additional anions: 05 Tarapacaite, 10 Chromatite, 15 Hashemite, 20 Crocoite
  - 07.FB With additional O, V, S, Cl: 05 Phoenicochroite, 10 Santanaite, 15 Wattersite, 20 Deanesmithite, 25 Edoylerite
  - 07.FC With PO_{4}, AsO_{4}, SiO_{4}: 05 Vauquelinite; 10 Fornacite, 10 Molybdofornacite; 15 Hemihedrite, 15 Iranite; 20 Embreyite, 20 Cassedanneite;
  - 07.FD Dichromates: 05 Lópezite

=== Class: molybdates, wolframates and niobates ===
- 07.G Molybdates, wolframates and niobates
  - 07.GA Without additional anions or H_{2}O: 05 Fergusonite-(Ce), 05 Fergusonite-(Nd)^{N}, 05 Fergusonite-(Y), 05 Powellite, 05 Wulfenite, 05 Stolzite, 05 Scheelite; 10 Formanite-(Y), 10 Iwashiroite-(Y); 15 Paraniite-(Y)
  - 07.GB With additional anions and/or H_{2}O: 05 Lindgrenite, 10 Szenicsite, 15 Cuprotungstite, 20 Phyllotungstite, 25 Rankachite, 30 Ferrimolybdite, 35 Anthoinite, 35 Mpororoite, 40 Obradovicite-KCu, 45 Mendozavilite-NaFe, 45 Paramendozavilite, 50 Tancaite-(Ce)
- 07.H Uranium and uranyl molybdates and wolframates
  - 07.HA With U^{4+}: 05 Sedovite, 10 Cousinite, 15 Moluranite
  - 07.HB With U^{6+}: 15 Calcurmolite, 20 Tengchongite, 25 Uranotungstite
