= Cesanite =

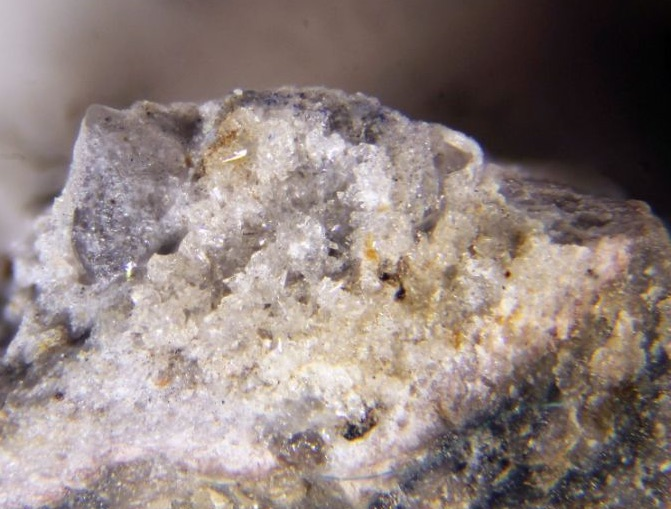

General
- Category: Sulfate minerals
- Formula: Ca_{2}Na_{3}[(OH)(SO_{4})_{3}]
- IMA symbol: Csa
- Strunz classification: 7.BD.20
- Crystal system: Hexagonal
- Crystal class: Trigonal dipyramidal (3̅m); H-M symbol: (6̅)
- Space group: P6̅
- Unit cell: a = 9.44 Å, c = 6.9 Å; Z = 1

Identification
- Color: Colorless to white
- Crystal habit: Massive granular, rarely as striated subhedral prismatic crystals
- Twinning: On {101̅0}
- Cleavage: On {0001}
- Mohs scale hardness: 2-3
- Luster: Greasy to silky in aggregates
- Diaphaneity: Transparent to translucent
- Specific gravity: 2.96-3.02
- Optical properties: Uniaxial (-)
- Refractive index: n_{ω} = 1.570 n_{ε} = 1.564
- Solubility: Slight in water

Cesanite is the end member of the apatite-wilkeite-ellestadite series that substitutes all of apatite's phosphate ions with sulfate ions and balances the difference in charge by replacing several calcium ions with sodium ions. Currently very few sites bearing cesanite have been found and are limited to a geothermal field in Cesano, Italy from which its name is derived, Măgurici Cave in Romania, and in the San Salvador Island caves in the Bahamas.

== History ==
Cesanite was first discovered in 1981 while the Italian National Electricity Board was doing exploratory drilling to examine a reservoir of heated brine to determine its potential as a geothermal energy source. When it was first found it was thought to be an apatite until after more thorough examination.

== Structure ==
Cesanite was originally determined by Tazzoli (1983) to be isotypic to that of hydroxylapatite. This was determined by refining the original unit cell dimensions and comparing them to the atomic coordinates of Holly Springs hydroxylapatite. From this it was extrapolated that although different elements are substituted for cesanite, the structure and cell parameters are nearly the same with some differences in the bond lengths of the tetrahedra. This similarity was to confirm the space group P6̅3/m previously assigned to cesanite, this changed in 2002 after a reexamination of cesanite by Piotrowski et al. was prompted by its similarities to a synthetically produced analog. After this study it was found that the crystal structure of cesanite to be isostructural to this synthetic analog with the chemical formula Ca_{2}Na_{3}[(OH)(SO_{4})_{3}]. What can be inferred from this is that while hydroxylapatite remains similar in its chemical formula it is not longer to be considered a structural analog. The new correct space group is P6̅. It can be inferred that the reason the mistake went unnoticed for so long is that cesanite retains pseudo-symmetry in the array of its tetrahedra that closely mimics P6̅3/m.

Cesanite's crystal structure is made up of tetrahedra of sulfide cations surrounded by oxygen anions distributed along with hydroxide ions around the Ca and Na ions occupying the M1 through four sites. The M1 and M2 cites create distorted pentagonal bipyramids while the M3 and M4 create tricapped trigonal prisms. The M3 and M4 polyhedra share faces when they are next to each other and form columns parallel to [001] while isolated sulfate tetrahedra alternate along the c axis.

== Physical properties ==
Cesanite veins are massive in habit and appear white in color with a silky luster. Individual crystals are colorless and transparent to translucent with a greasy luster. These crystals are elongated and begin with a pyramid on {101*0} that is distorted by a flatting that occurs down the length of the crystal which then extends down with two parallel faces until they are cut off by either a pinacoid or another pyramid. According to the newest sources the unit-cell parameters of cesanite are a = 9.4630 and c = 6.9088 Å. In thin section cesanite remains transparent and has moderate birefringence. In addition to is structure at room temperature, cesanite exhibits different crystal structures at different temperatures. Polymorphs occur at 425, 625, and 740 °C. These different forms are cause by expansion along the crystallographic axes as cesanite is heated.

== Geologic occurrence ==
Cesanite has been found in only three places to date. The original occurrence was observed as part of a fracture sealing process where cesanite crystals grew to fill in the void. It was found growing in a loosely packed vein of small crystals that became intergrown with those of the neighboring görgeyite crystals. Further occurrences have been noticed in several caves. First in 2001 inside of Lighthouse Cave located on San Salvador Island filling in gaps in corroded gypsum and in 2003 inside Măgurici Cave in Romania it was found in close association with hydroxylapatite. It has been presumed that in sequence hydroxylapatite is deposited followed by the formation of cesanite when the solution in which the crystals are being formed is rich in sodium and sulfate and depleted of calcium.

== See also ==
- Beraunite
