= Aiolosite =

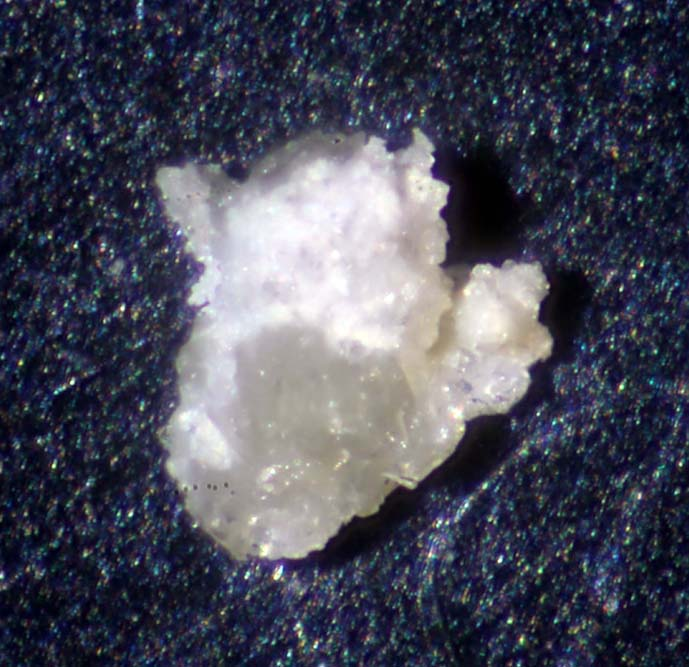
- Aiolosite found at its type locality, the only known locality worldwide

General
- Category: Minerals
- Formula: Na_{4}Bi(SO_{4})_{3}Cl
- IMA symbol: Aio

Identification
- Color: Colourless to white
- Luster: Vitreous
- Streak: White
- Diaphaneity: Translucent
- Specific gravity: 3.589

Aiolosite is a rare sodium bismuth sulfate mineral with the chemical formula Na_{4}Bi(SO_{4})_{3}Cl. Its type locality is Vulcano, Sicily, Italy. Its name comes from the Greek name Aeolus.
