= Lecontite =

Sulfate mineral

General
- Category: Sulfate mineral
- Formula: (NH_{4},K)NaSO_{4}·2H_{2}O
- IMA symbol: Lcn
- Strunz classification: 7.CD.15
- Crystal system: Orthorhombic

Identification
- Color: Colorless
- Cleavage: {011} Distinct
- Mohs scale hardness: 2–2.5
- Luster: Vitreous to dull
- Streak: White
- Diaphaneity: Transparent to translucent
- Specific gravity: 1.745 g/cc
- Density: 1.745 g/cc
- Refractive index: nα = 1.440 nβ = 1.454 nγ = 1.455
- Birefringence: δ = 0.015

Lecontite (sodium ammonium sulfate dihydrate, with potassium substituting for some ammonium, typically about a fourth) is a sulfate mineral with the formula (NH_{4},K)NaSO_{4}·2H_{2}O. It was found by John Lawrence LeConte in Las Piedras Cave in Honduras as a breakdown product of bat guano, including crystals up to an inch long and identified as a separate mineral by W.J. Taylor in 1858. As of 1963 most natural specimens came from the same cave.

Lecontite can easily be synthesized by reacting ammonium sulfate with sodium sulfate in aqueous solution and crystallized.
