= Xitieshanite =

Sulfate mineral

General
- Category: Sulfate mineral
- Formula: Fe^{3+}(SO_{4})Cl·6(H_{2}O)
- IMA symbol: Xit
- Strunz classification: 7.DC.20
- Crystal system: Monoclinic
- Crystal class: Prismatic (2/m) (same H-M symbol)
- Space group: P2_{1}/a
- Unit cell: a = 14.1 Å, b = 6.9 Å c = 10.67 Å; β = 111.26°; Z = 4

Identification
- Formula mass: 313.47 g/mol
- Color: Green; yellow green
- Crystal habit: Acicular
- Cleavage: Uncertain / indistinct
- Fracture: Conchoidal to uneven
- Mohs scale hardness: 2.5 - 3
- Luster: Vitreous
- Streak: Yellow
- Diaphaneity: Transparent to translucent
- Specific gravity: 1.99
- Optical properties: Biaxial (-)
- Refractive index: nα = 1.536 nβ = 1.570 nγ = 1.628
- Birefringence: 0.092
- Pleochroism: Colorless (x) to pale yellow (y) to light greenish yellow (z)
- 2V angle: Measured: 77°
- Dispersion: r > v

Xitieshanite is a hydrous iron sulfate–chloride mineral with chemical formula: Fe^{3+}(SO_{4})Cl·6(H_{2}O).

It was discovered in 1983 and named for the discovery location of Xitieshan lead/zinc ore deposit in the Qinghai Province, China. It was approved by the IMA in the year of its discovery. The mineral has also been reported in 2005 from acid mine drainage from a coal mine in Green Valley, Vigo County, Indiana.

== Properties ==
Xitieshanite mainly consists of oxygen (56.14%) and iron (17.82%), but otherwise contains chlorine (11.31%), sulphur (10.23%) and hydrogen (4.50%). This mineral grown in lead-zinc mines, in the oxidation zone of it. Xitieshanite is a pleochroic mineral, which is an optical phenomenon, meaning the mineral appears as if it's changing colors depending on the axis it is being inspected at. On the X axis it appears as it's colorless, while it looks pale yellow if viewed on the Y axis, and light greenish yellow on the Z axis. It doesn't show any radioactive properties whatsoever.
