= Löweite =

Rare evaporite sulfate mineral

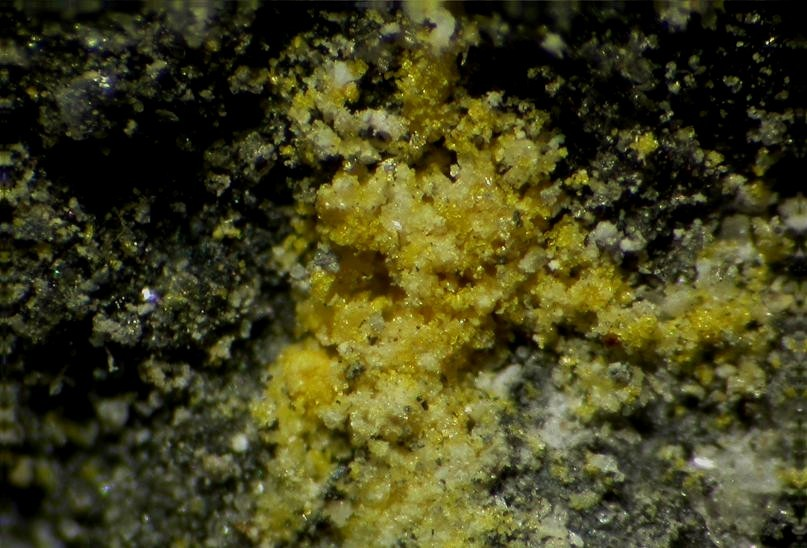

General
- Category: Sulfate minerals
- Formula: Na_{12}Mg_{7}(SO_{4})_{13}·15H_{2}O
- Strunz classification: 7.CC.45
- Dana classification: 29.04.03.01
- Crystal system: Trigonal
- Crystal class: Trigonal-rhombohedral (3)
- Space group: R3 (No. 148)
- Unit cell: a = 18.86 Å; c = 13.40 Å; Z = 3

Identification
- Color: Colorless; reddish-yellow to orange with impurities
- Mohs scale hardness: 2.5–3
- Luster: Vitreous
- Streak: White
- Diaphaneity: Transparent to translucent
- Specific gravity: 2.36–2.42
- Optical properties: Uniaxial (–)
- Refractive index: n_{ω} = 1.490; n_{ε} = 1.471
- Birefringence: δ = 0.019
- Solubility: Water-soluble

Löweite is a rare evaporite sulfate mineral, with the chemical formula Na_{12}Mg_{7}(SO_{4})_{13}·15H_{2}O.

It crystallizes in the hexagonal–trigonal system (space group R3), and is found in marine salt deposits, saline playa crusts, and occasionally as a volcanic sublimation product.

It is colorless, but may appear reddish-yellow due to impurities. Löweite has a vitreous luster and a Mohs hardness of 2.5–3.

== Discovery ==
Loweite was discovered in 1846 in at the Bad Ischler Salzberg near Bad Ischl, Austria. and described and classified by the Austrian mineralogist Wilhelm Haidinger in 1847. It is named in honor of the Austrian chemist Alexander Löwe.
