= Zincmelanterite =

Sulfate mineral

General
- Category: Sulfate minerals
- Formula: (Zn,Cu,Fe)SO_{4}·7H_{2}O
- IMA symbol: Zmln
- Strunz classification: 7.CB.35
- Crystal system: Monoclinic
- Crystal class: Prismatic (2/m) (same H-M symbol)
- Space group: P2_{1}/c

Identification
- Color: Pale greenish-blue, yellow-green, apple-green
- Luster: Vitreous

Zincmelanterite is a mineral, a sulfate of zinc, copper and iron with the chemical formula (Zn,Cu,Fe)SO_{4}·7H_{2}O. It is a soft monoclinic yellow green mineral with Mohs hardness of 2 and a specific gravity of 2.02.

It was discovered in 1920 in the Vulcan mining district of Gunnison County, Colorado, United States, and is named for its zinc content and its resemblance to melanterite.
