= Amarantite =

Sulfate mineral

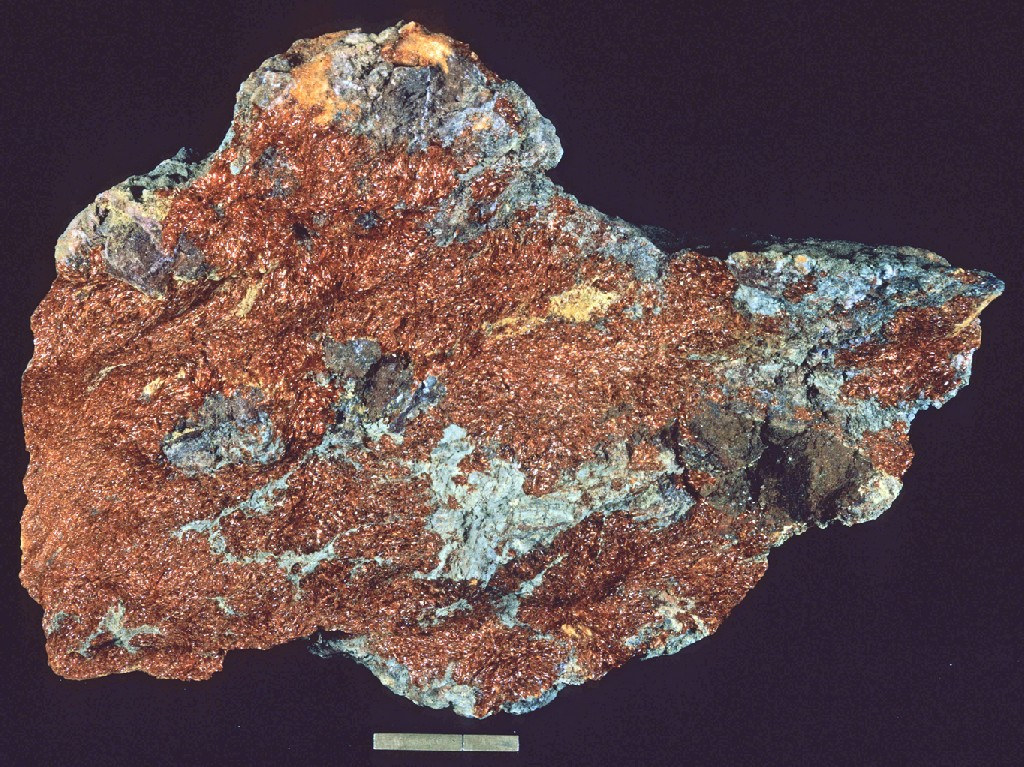

General
- Category: Sulfate minerals
- Formula: Fe^{3+}_{2}O(SO_{4})_{2}·7H_{2}O
- IMA symbol: Ama
- Strunz classification: 7.DB.30
- Crystal system: Triclinic
- Crystal class: Pinacoidal (1̅) (same H-M symbol)
- Space group: P1̅
- Unit cell: a = 8.9, b = 11.56 c = 6.64 [Å]; α = 95.55° β = 90.52°, γ = 97.42°; Z = 2

Identification
- Color: Amaranth-red to brownish red, orange-red
- Crystal habit: As radiating or matted aggregates of needles; may be columnar or bladed
- Cleavage: Perfect on {010} and {100}
- Tenacity: Brittle
- Mohs scale hardness: 2 1/2
- Luster: Vitreous
- Streak: Lemon-yellow
- Diaphaneity: Transparent
- Specific gravity: 2.189–2.286
- Optical properties: Biaxial (−)
- Refractive index: n_{α} = 1.516 n_{β} = 1.598 n_{γ} = 1.621
- Birefringence: δ = 0.105
- Pleochroism: X = colorless; Y = pale yellow; Z = reddish brown
- 2V angle: Measured: 30°

Amarantite is an amaranth-red to brownish mineral with the general formula of Fe^{3+}_{2}O(SO_{4})_{2}·7H_{2}O or Fe^{3+}SO_{4}(OH)·3H_{2}O.

The name comes from the Greek word αμάραντος which means amaranth, an imaginary undying red flower, in allusion to its color.

Amarantite is triclinic, which means crystallographically, it has only one symmetry fold. It must be rotated 360 degrees to be exactly the same. Due to it being triclinic it falls into the biaxial optical class, the axis degrees do not equal 90 degrees and the sides of each axis are not the same length. Amarantite is anisotropic, which means, the velocity of light varies with crystallographic direction, and there is more than one refractive index.

Amarantite is a very rare mineral and can only be found in a couple of places such as Carocoles, Chile. Although it is a source of iron, there is not enough amarantite to be mined for iron. However, when found in crystal form its red orange color gives it value as a collector's item.
