= Szomolnokite =

Sulfate mineral

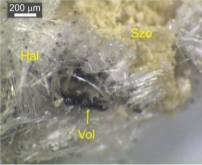
- Halotrichite (Hal); szomolnokite (Szo) and voltaite (Vol)

General
- Category: Sulfate mineral
- Formula: Fe^{2+}SO_{4} · H_{2}O
- IMA symbol: Szo
- Strunz classification: 7.CB.05
- Dana classification: 29.6.2.2
- Crystal system: Monoclinic
- Crystal class: Prismatic (2/m)
- Space group: C2/c (no. 15)

Identification
- Color: Sulfur-yellow, yellow-brown, red-brown, blue, colorless
- Crystal habit: Bipyramidal, distorted, tabular, parallel growths, globular, stalactites
- Fracture: Conchoidal to sub-conchoidal, uneven
- Tenacity: Brittle
- Mohs scale hardness: 2.5
- Luster: Vitreous
- Diaphaneity: Translucent
- Specific gravity: 3.03–3.07 (measured), 3.10 (calculated)
- Optical properties: Biaxial (+), colorless (transmitted light)
- 2V angle: 80° (measured), 86° (calculated)

Szomolnokite (Fe^{2+}SO_{4}·H_{2}O) is a monoclinic iron sulfate mineral forming a complete solid solution with magnesium end-member kieserite (MgSO_{4}·H_{2}O). In 1877 szomolnokite's name was derived by Joseph Krenner from its type locality of oxidized sulfide ore containing iron in Szomolnok, Slovakia (Hungary at the time).

As of mid-January 2020 the only continent on which szomolnokite has not been found and reported is Antarctica.

At room temperature szomolnokite is stable up to a pressure of 6.2 GPa, and then transforms into triclinic crystal structure.

== Bibliography ==
- Palache, P.; Berman H.; Frondel, C. (1960). "Dana's System of Mineralogy, Volume II: Halides, Nitrates, Borates, Carbonates, Sulfates, Phosphates, Arsenates, Tungstates, Molybdates, Etc. (Seventh Edition)" John Wiley and Sons, Inc., New York, pp. 479–480.
