= Letovicite =

Ammonium sulfate mineral

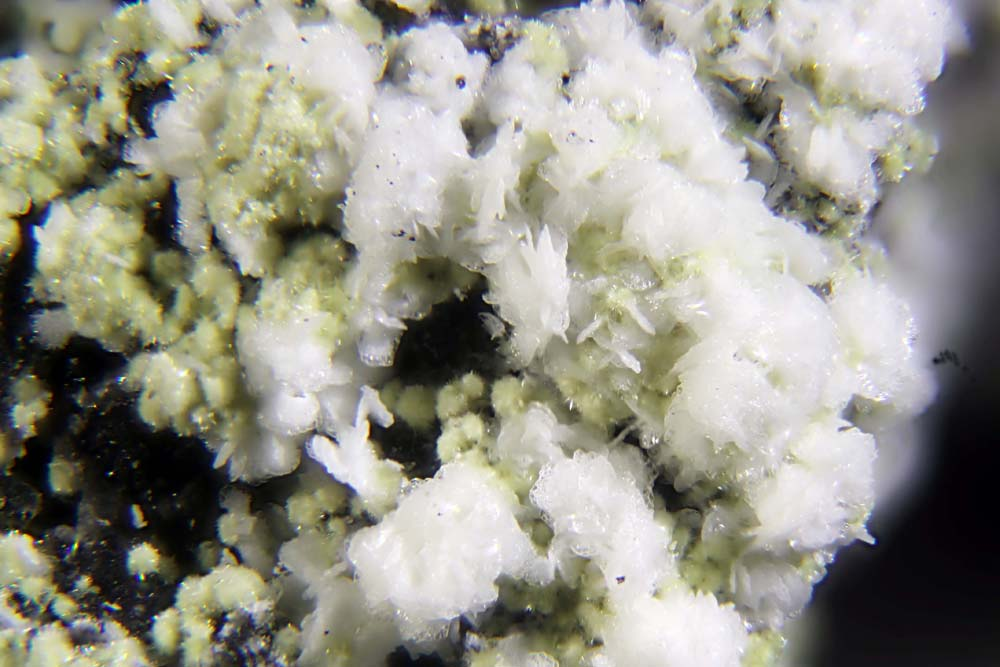
- White crystals of ammonium sulfate mineral letovicite from the Anna 2 Mine, Aachen, North Rhine – Westphalia, Germany.

General
- Category: Sulfate mineral
- Formula: (NH_{4})_{3}H(SO_{4})_{2}
- IMA symbol: Let
- Strunz classification: 07.AD.20
- Dana classification: 28.1.3.1
- Crystal system: Monoclinic
- Crystal class: Prismatic (2/m)
- Space group: C2/c (no. 15)

Identification
- Color: Colorless, white
- Crystal habit: Tiny pseudo-hexagonal plates, granular
- Twinning: Lamellar twinning
- Cleavage: Distinct on {001}
- Fracture: Uneven
- Mohs scale hardness: 1–2
- Diaphaneity: Transparent
- Specific gravity: 1.83
- Optical properties: Biaxial (−), colorless (transmitted light)
- 2V angle: 75° (calc.)
- Solubility: Soluble in water

Letovicite (/lɛtoʊˈvɪsaɪt/) is an ammonium sulfate mineral with composition (NH_{4})_{3}H(SO_{4})_{2} (IUPAC: triammonium sulfate hydrogensulfate, Nickel–Strunz classification 07.AD.20).

It is a rare colorless or white monoclinic secondary mineral formed during the burning of waste coal heaps and as a deposit in hot springs. It was first described from the Letovice region of Moravia in 1932. Geologic occurrences also include Austria, Germany, Hungary, Italy, Poland, South Africa, Tajikistan and the United States.

== Bibliography ==
- Palache, P.; Berman H.; Frondel, C. (1960). "Dana's System of Mineralogy, Volume II: Halides, Nitrates, Borates, Carbonates, Sulfates, Phosphates, Arsenates, Tungstates, Molybdates, Etc. (Seventh Edition)" John Wiley and Sons, Inc., New York, pp. 397.
