= Rhomboclase =

General
- Category: Sulfate mineral
- Formula: H_{5}Fe^{3+}O_{2}(SO_{4})_{2}·2(H_{2}O)
- IMA symbol: Rbc
- Strunz classification: 7.CB.55
- Crystal system: Orthorhombic
- Crystal class: Dipyramidal (mmm); H-M symbol: (2/m 2/m 2/m)
- Space group: Pnma

Identification
- Color: blue, colourless, white, yellow, light green, grey
- Luster: sub-Vitreous, Pearly
- Streak: white
- Diaphaneity: transparent

Rhomboclase is an acidic iron sulfate mineral with a formula reported as H_{5}Fe^{3+}O_{2}(SO_{4})_{2}·2(H_{2}O) or HFe(SO_{4})_{2}·4(H_{2}O). It crystallizes in the orthorhombic system and typically occurs as tabular crystals with a rhombic outline. It occurs as transparent colorless, blue, green, yellow or grey crystals with a vitreous to pearly luster.

Rhomboclase forms within the oxidizing environment of pyrite rich ore deposits and is reported as a post mine mineral of arid regions.

It was first described in 1888 for an occurrence in Slovakia and was named from Latin, rhombus, rhomb, and Greek klasis, to break, for its crystal form and perfect basal cleavage.
