= Jurbanite =

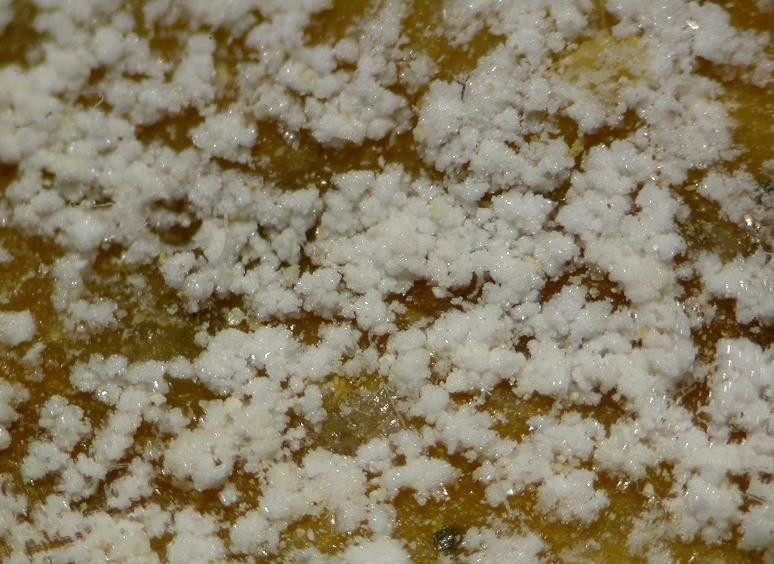
- Jurbanite (field of view: 5 mm)

General
- Category: Sulfate minerals
- Formula: AlSO_{4}(OH)·5H_{2}O
- IMA symbol: Jur
- Strunz classification: 7.DB.15
- Dana classification: 31.9.10.1
- Crystal system: Monoclinic
- Crystal class: Prismatic (2/m) (same H-M symbol)
- Space group: P2_{1}/n

Identification
- Color: Colorless
- Crystal habit: Small crystals and stalactitic forms
- Tenacity: Brittle
- Mohs scale hardness: 2.5
- Luster: Vitreous
- Diaphaneity: Transparent
- Specific gravity: 1.786
- Optical properties: Biaxial (-)
- Refractive index: n_{α} = 1.459 n_{β} = 1.473 n_{γ} = 1.483
- Birefringence: δ = 0.024
- 2V angle: Measured: 80°
- Solubility: Soluble in water

Jurbanite is a sulfate mineral with the chemical formula AlSO_{4}(OH)·5H_{2}O. Its molecular weight is 230.13 g/mol. It crystallizes in the monoclinic system and is dimorphous with the orthorhombic mineral rostite. Jurbanite occurs as a secondary (post-mine) mineral in mines containing sulfide minerals.

Jurbanite was first described for an occurrence in the San Manuel mine of Pinal County, Arizona and first described in 1976s. It was named for Joseph John Urban, the mineral collector who discovered it.
