= Charlesite =

Sulfate mineral

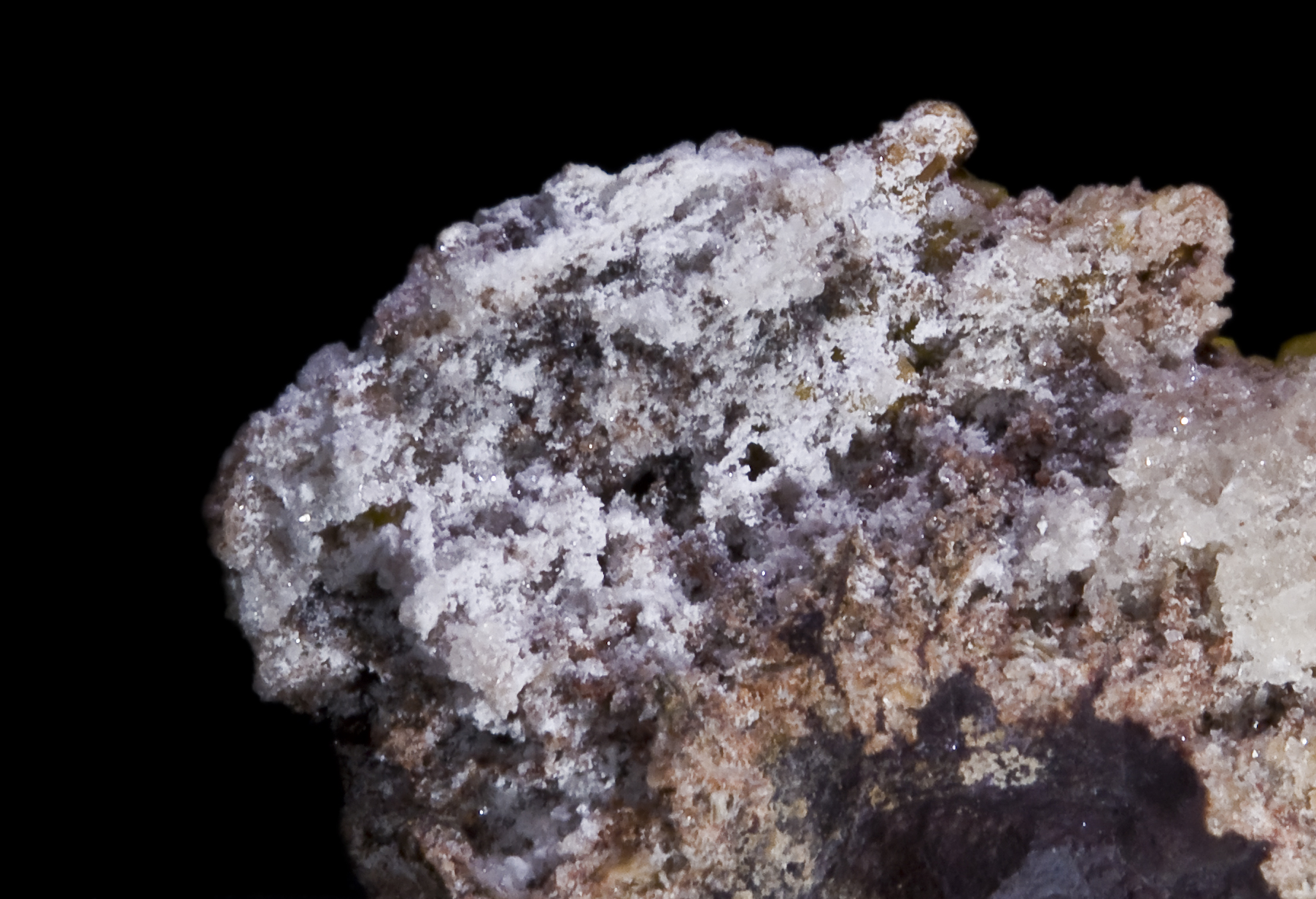
- Charlesite from N'Chwaning mines, Kalahari manganese fields, Northern Cape Province, South Africa

General
- Category: Sulfate mineral Ettringite group
- Formula: Ca_{6}(Al,Si)_{2}(SO_{4})_{2}B(OH_{4})(O,OH)_{12}·26H_{2}O
- IMA symbol: Chrl
- Strunz classification: 7.DG.15
- Dana classification: 32.4.4.1
- Crystal system: Trigonal
- Crystal class: Ditrigonal pyramidal (3m) (same H-M symbol)
- Space group: P31c
- Unit cell: a = 11.16 Å, c = 21.21 Å; Z = 2

Identification
- Color: Colorless, white, rarely pale yellow, rarely pink
- Crystal habit: Prismatic, hexagonal dipyramidal crystals
- Twinning: none
- Cleavage: Perfect on {10bar10}
- Fracture: Irregular/Uneven
- Tenacity: Brittle
- Mohs scale hardness: 2.5
- Luster: Vitreous on cleavage and fracture surfaces
- Streak: White
- Diaphaneity: Transparent
- Density: 1.77 g/cm3
- Optical properties: uniaxial (-)
- Refractive index: n_{ώ} = 1.492(3) n_{∈} = 1.475(3)
- Pleochroism: Nearly colorless to pale golden yellow
- Ultraviolet fluorescence: there is weak violet or weak green short wave ultraviolet radiation

Charlesite is a sulfate mineral of the ettringite group. Charlesite was named in 1945 after Dr. Charles Palache, a mineralogist and professor at Harvard University for his work on minerals. This mineral is extremely rare, and when it is found it is usually in crystal (but not gem) form. Its crystals are soft and hexagonal, and can vary in color. Colors can range from clear to white, or even pale yellow or pink. The brittle mineral's Mohs hardness is 2.5 with a specific gravity of 1.79. Though transparent to the eye, the mineral has a white streak.

== Occurrence ==
Charlesite has only been found in a few specific locations in the world. The first was its place of discovery at Franklin Mine in Franklin, Sussex County, New Jersey. It was located immediately above the 800 level, about 15 feet into the ore from the hanging wall. The ore mostly consisted of franklinite and willemite and several other minor minerals. The crystals found at this location were up to 6mm in length and were suspected to have grown alongside clinohedrite crystals.

The other location where charlesite has been located is the Wessel's Mine, N' Chwaning Mines, and Kalahari Manganese Fields in Northern Cape Province, South Africa. The Wessel's Mine is thought to be the only source for charlesite to be found in gem quality.

Several other recorded places are Germany, Japan, Norway, Romania, and Slovakia.

== Uses ==
Due to its rarity, there are very few uses for charlesite. Though there is not much of the mineral, one of the major uses for specimens that meet the necessary standards is gems. Due to its softness, it will not be found in much jewelry.

Some other uses could be for studying the reasons for the rarity of the mineral, teaching mineralogy classes, or even serving as items for collectors or museums of rare minerals.

== Composition ==
| Element | Percent | Header |
|---|---|---|
| Calcium | 19.48% | Ca |
| Aluminum | 3.28% | Al |
| Silicon | 1.14% | Si |
| Boron | .88% | B |
| Hydrogen | 5.23% | H |
| Sulfur | 5.20% | S |
| Oxygen | 64.81% | O |

| Oxides | Percent |
|---|---|
| CaO | 27.26% |
| Al_{2}O_{3} | 6.19% |
| SiO_{2} | 2.43% |
| B_{2}O_{3} | 2.82% |
| H_{2}O | 46.7% |
| SO_{3} | 12.97% |
