= Osarizawaite =

Sulfate mineral

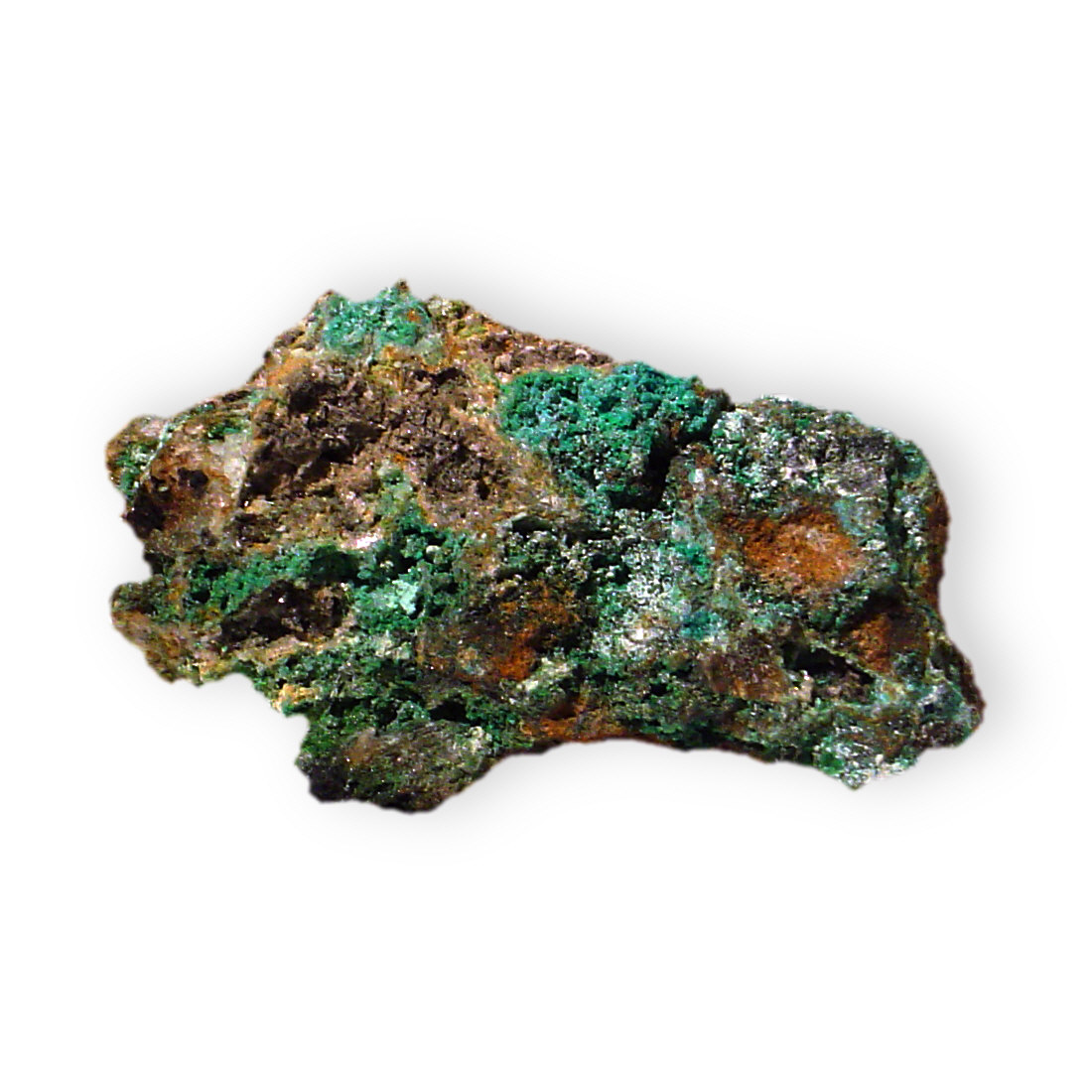
- Osarizawaite from Arizona

General
- Category: Sulfate minerals, alunite group
- Formula: PbCuAl_{2}(SO_{4})_{2}(OH)_{6}
- IMA symbol: Orz
- Strunz classification: 7.BC.10
- Crystal system: Trigonal
- Crystal class: Hexagonal scalenohedral (3̅m); H-M symbol: (3̅ 2/m)
- Space group: R3̅m
- Unit cell: a = 7.05, c = 17.24(1) [Å], Z = 3

Identification
- Color: Greenish yellow
- Tenacity: Brittle
- Mohs scale hardness: 3–4
- Specific gravity: 3.89 – 4.037
- Optical properties: Uniaxial (+)
- Refractive index: n_{ω} = 1.712() n_{ε} = 1.732(2)
- Birefringence: δ = 0.020
- Pleochroism: Visible

Osarizawaite is a greenish yellow sulfate mineral with the chemical formula: PbCuAl_{2}(SO_{4})_{2}(OH)_{6}. It has rhombohedral crystals.

It was first described in 1961 for an occurrence in the oxidized zone of the Osarizawa mine, Akita Prefecture, Honshu Island, Japan.
