= Felsőbányaite =

Sulfate mineral

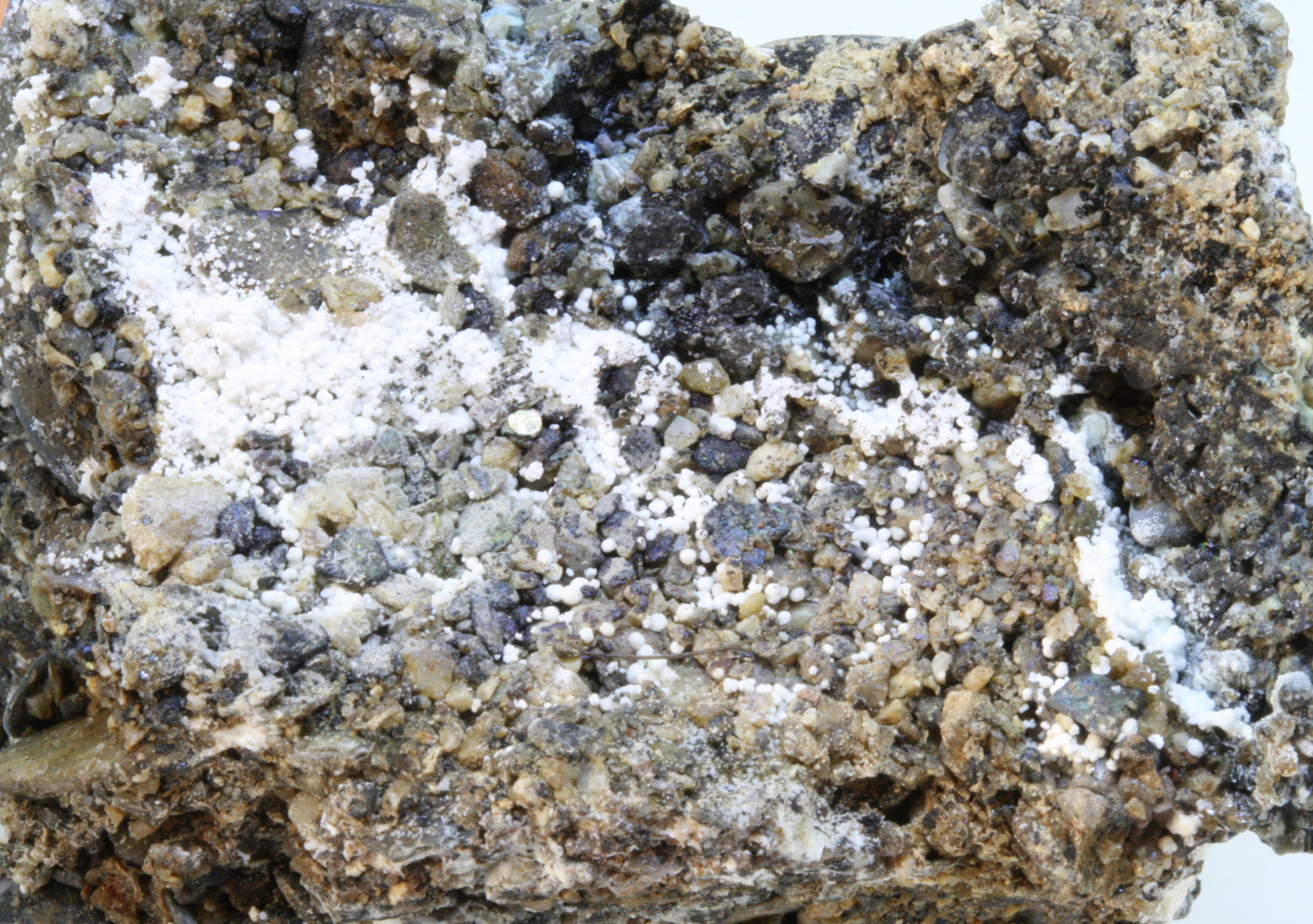
- Felsöbanyaite as white spherules. Roadcut near Sant Marti dels Castells (Lérida) Spain

General
- Category: Sulfate mineral
- Formula: Al_{4}(SO_{4})(OH)_{10}·4H_{2}O
- IMA symbol: Fsb
- Strunz classification: 7.DD.05
- Crystal system: Monoclinic
- Crystal class: Sphenoidal (2) (same H-M symbol)
- Space group: P2_{1}
- Unit cell: a = 13.026 Å, b = 10.015 Å, c = 11.115 Å; β = 104.34°; Z = 4

Identification
- Color: White to pale yellow, pale brown
- Crystal habit: Globular masses, minute rhombic crystals
- Cleavage: Distinct to good on {010} and {100}
- Mohs scale hardness: 1.5
- Luster: Vitreous, pearly on cleavage surfaces
- Diaphaneity: Semitransparent
- Specific gravity: 2.33
- Optical properties: Biaxial (+)
- Refractive index: n = 1.515–1.540

Felsőbányaite or basaluminite is a hydrated aluminium sulfate mineral with formula: Al_{4}(SO_{4})(OH)_{10}·4H_{2}O. It is a rare white to pale yellow mineral which typically occurs as globular masses and incrustations or as minute rhombic crystals. It crystallizes in the monoclinic crystal system.

It occurs as a weathering product under acidic conditions associated with pyrite or marcasite decomposition. Associated minerals include hydrobasaluminite, hydroargillite, meta-aluminite, allophane, gibbsite, gypsum and aragonite.

Felsőbányaite was first described in 1853 for an occurrence in the Baia Sprie mine, Baia Sprie (Felsőbánya), Maramureș County, Romania, and named for the locality. The mineral name basaluminite was used for an occurrence of the same mineral in England in 1948 and discredited by the International Mineralogical Association (IMA) in 2006.
