= Tarapacaite =

Tarapacáite

General
- Category: Sulfate minerals
- Formula: K_{2}(CrO_{4})
- Strunz classification: 7.FA.05
- Dana classification: 35.2.1.1.1 Anhydrous chromates
- Crystal system: Orthorhombic
- Crystal class: Dipyramidal (mmm); H-M symbol: (2/m 2/m 2/m)
- Space group: Pnam (no. 62)

Identification
- Color: Bright yellow, yellow-orange
- Crystal habit: Thick tabular
- Cleavage: Distinct/good; On {001} and {010}, distinct
- Diaphaneity: Transparent
- Specific gravity: 2.735
- Solubility: Soluble in water
- Other characteristics: Health risks: contains the carcinogenic and mutagenic chromate ion

Tarapacáite is the mineral form of potassium chromate with the chemical formula K_{2}CrO_{4}. It forms bright yellow crystals and was discovered in 1878. It is named for the former Tarapacá Province, Peru; nowadays belonging to Chile. The boundaries between Peru, Bolivia and Chile were vague in the Atacama Desert before the War of the Pacific (1879–1883). Its type locality is Oficina Maria Elena, Maria Elena, Tocopilla Province, Antofagasta Region, Chile. It is unlikely to occur anywhere except in highly arid conditions as it is easily soluble in water.
