= Uklonskovite =

Sulfate mineral

General
- Category: Sulfate minerals
- Formula: NaMgSO_{4}(OH)·2H_{2}O
- IMA symbol: Ukl
- Strunz classification: 7.DF.05
- Crystal system: Monoclinic
- Crystal class: Prismatic (2/m) (same H-M symbol)
- Space group: P2_{1}/m
- Unit cell: a = 7.2 Å, b = 7.21 Å c = 5.73 Å; β = 113.23°; Z = 2

Identification
- Color: colorless
- Luster: vitreous
- Diaphaneity: transparent

Uklonskovite (Na Mg(S O_{4})F) is a colorless monoclinic mineral found in Chile, Italy and Uzbekistan. It is named after Alexandr Sergeievich Uklonskii (b. 1888), mineralogist, Academy of Sciences, Uzbekistan. Its type locality is Kushkanatau salt deposit, Lower Amu Darya River, Karakalpakstan Respublikasi, Uzbekistan.
