= Zippeite =

Hydrous potassium uranium sulfate mineral

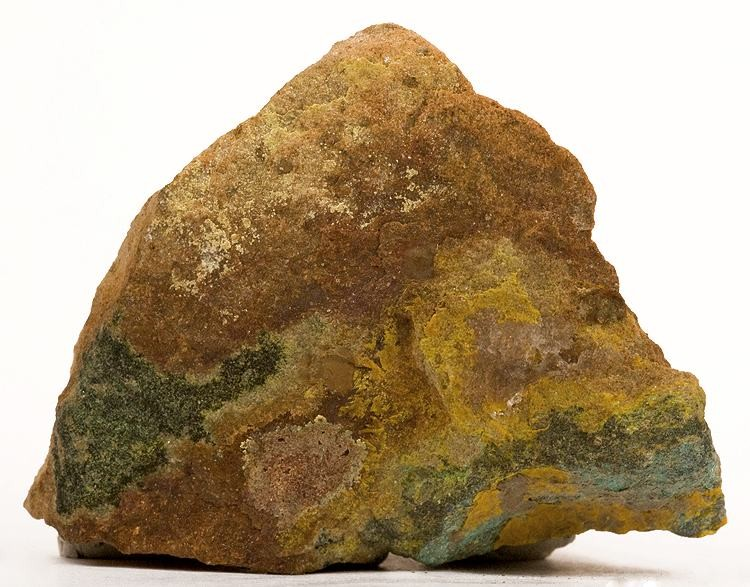
- Zippeite from Delta Mine in Utah, 6.4 cm long

General
- Category: Sulfate minerals
- Formula: K_{4}(UO_{2})_{6}(SO_{4})_{3}(OH)_{10}·4(H_{2}O)
- IMA symbol: Zip
- Strunz classification: 7.EC.05
- Dana classification: 31.10.04.01
- Crystal system: Monoclinic
- Crystal class: Sphenoidal (2) (same H-M symbol)
- Space group: B2

Identification
- Formula mass: 2,306.88 g/mol
- Colour: Yellow, golden yellow, orange red, reddish brown
- Crystal habit: Encrustations – forms crust-like aggregates on matrix
- Mohs scale hardness: 2
- Lustre: Silky, dull
- Streak: Yellow white
- Diaphaneity: Transparent to translucent
- Specific gravity: 3.66
- Other characteristics: Radioactive

Zippeite is a hydrous potassium uranium sulfate mineral with formula: K_{4}(UO_{2})_{6}(SO_{4})_{3}(OH)_{10}·4(H_{2}O). It forms yellow to reddish brown monoclinic-prismatic crystals with perfect cleavage. The typical form is as encrustations and pulverulent earthy masses. It forms as efflorescent encrustations in underground uranium mines. It has a Mohs hardness of 2 and a specific gravity of 3.66. It is strongly fluorescent yellow under ultraviolet light and is moderately radioactive.

== Historical usage ==
A mineral which caught the attention of a Bohemian metallurgist, Adolf Patera, in the 1850s by its striking colour. It was named after the Austrian mineralogist Franz Xaver Maximilian Zippe (1791–1863). This was during the period when the fame of the Jachymov silver mines was dying out. On top of the large, forgotten pit-heaps, powdery minerals began to appear, vividly coloured, originating from the decomposition of the pitchblende. These colourful layers, in which zippeite was in the majority, gave Patera the idea of utilizing the uranium minerals in the manufacture of paints. Mining began in 1859 not only for the products which resulted from uraninite's decomposition, but for uraninite itself. A variety of yellow paints were manufactured because among all the secondary minerals on the pit-heap there was a prevalence of the yellow powdery coatings.

Zippeite is one of the so-called 'uranium ochres'. It occurs in association with uranopilite, a monoclinic, complex water-soluble alkaline with other secondary uranium minerals in the weathered veins of uranium. Apart from Jachymov in Bohemia it occurs mainly near Wölsendorf in Bavaria (Germany) and also in the US states of Utah and New Mexico. Zippeite is no longer used for the manufacture of paints, but is still used as a source of depleted uranium.

== See also ==
- List of minerals
- List of minerals named after people
