= Schwertmannite =

Iron-oxy-hydroxy-sulfate

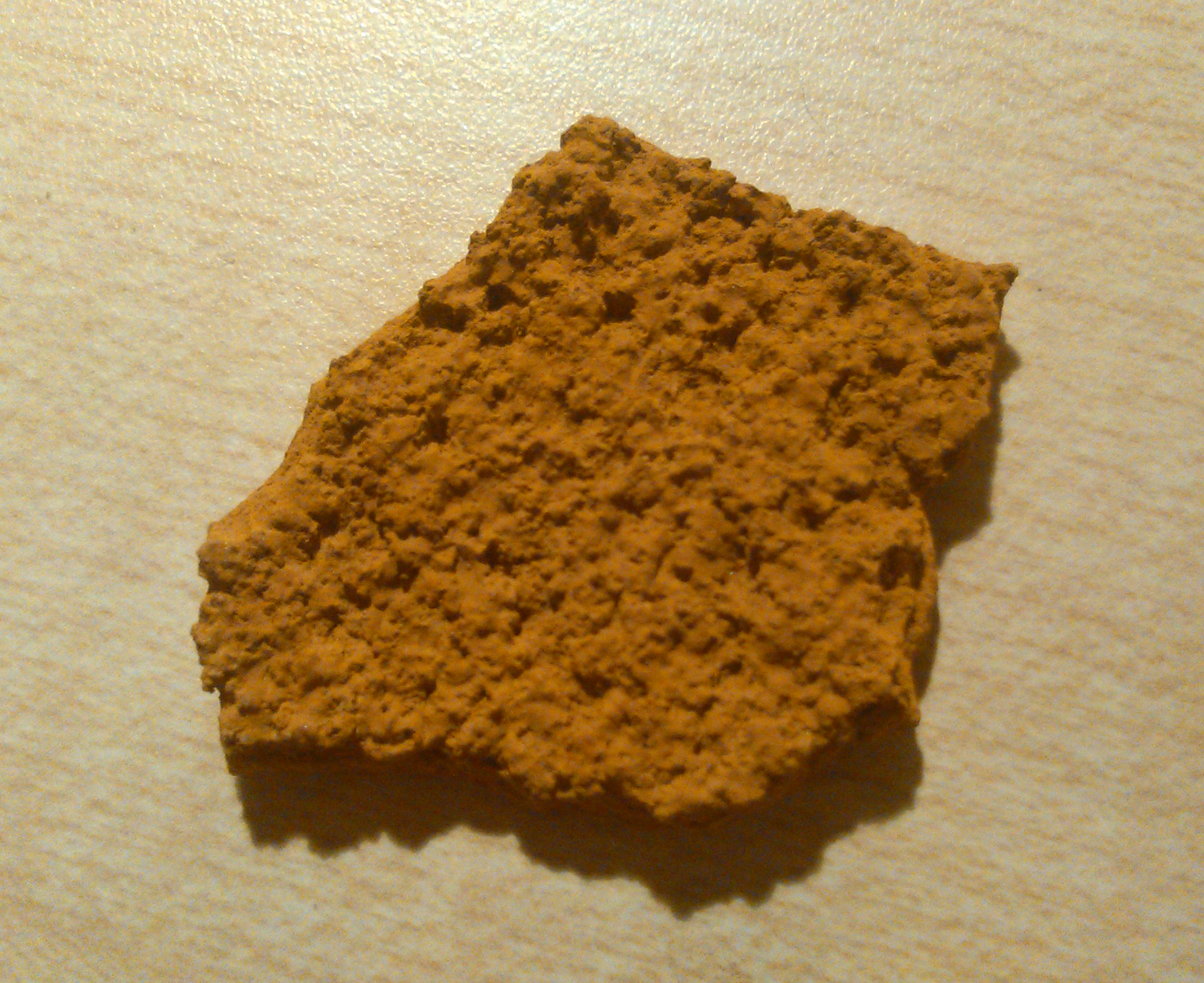

General
- Category: Sulfate minerals
- Formula: Fe_{8}O_{8}(OH)_{6}(SO_{4}) · n H_{2}O
- IMA symbol: Swm
- Strunz classification: 7.DE.15
- Crystal system: Tetragonal; Dipyramidal class
- Space group: Tetragonal; H-M symbol: (4/m); Space group: P4/m

Identification
- Color: brownish yellow
- Luster: earthy
- Streak: yellow
- Diaphaneity: opaque

Schwertmannite is an iron-oxyhydroxysulfate mineral with an ideal chemical formula of Fe_{8}O_{8}(OH)_{6}(SO_{4}) · n H_{2}O or Fe^{3+}_{16}O_{16}(OH,SO_{4})_{12–13}·10–12 H_{2}O. It is an opaque tetragonal mineral typically occurring as brownish yellow encrustations. It has a Mohs hardness of 2.5 – 3.5 and a specific gravity of 3.77 – 3.99.

It was first described for an occurrence in Finland in 1994 and named for Udo Schwertmann (born 1927), a soil scientist at the Technical University of Munich, Munich, Germany.

Schwertmannite (with a distinct "pin cushion" morphology) commonly forms in iron-rich, acidic sulfate waters in the pH-range of 2 – 4. The mineral was first recognised officially as a new mineral from a natural acid-sulfate spring occurrence at Pyhäsalmi, Finland. However, it is more commonly reported as an orange precipitate in streams and lakes affected by acid mine drainage. Schwertmannite is also known to be central to iron-sulfur geochemistry in acid sulfate soils associated with coastal lowlands.

== See also ==
- Alunite (KAl_{3}(SO_{4})_{2}(OH)_{6})
- Jarosite (KFe_{3}(SO_{4})_{2}(OH)_{6})
