= Grandreefite =

Rare secondary lead sulfate-fluoride mineral

General
- Category: Sulfate minerals
- Formula: Pb_{2}SO_{4}F_{2}
- IMA symbol: Grf
- Strunz classification: 7.BD.45
- Crystal system: Monoclinic
- Crystal class: Prismatic (2/m) (same H-M symbol)
- Space group: A2/a
- Unit cell: a = 8.667, b = 4.4419 c= 14.242 [Å]; β = 107.448° Z = 4; V = 523.15 Å^{3}

Identification
- Color: Colorless
- Twinning: Polysynthetic twins visible under cross polarized light
- Cleavage: None
- Fracture: Conchoidal
- Tenacity: Brittle
- Mohs scale hardness: 2.5
- Luster: Subadamantine
- Streak: White
- Specific gravity: 6.96
- Optical properties: Transparent, Biaxial(+)
- Refractive index: n_{α}=1.872, n_{β}=1.873, n_{γ}=1.895
- 2V angle: 23°
- Other characteristics: Decomposes in water

Grandreefite is a rare secondary lead sulfate-fluoride mineral with a general chemical formula, Pb_{2}SO_{4}F_{2}. It is named for the location in which it was discovered in 1989, the Grand Reef Mine in Graham County, Arizona.

Grandreefite is monoclinic, falling in the 2/m symmetry group. Crystallographically this means, grandreefite has three axes of unequal length, with two angles at 90° to one another and a third, obtuse angle. The 2/m symmetry group indicates a two-fold axis with a perpendicular mirror plane. Grandreefite was originally classified as an orthorhombic mineral but was determined monoclinic instead upon further analysis. Pseudograndreefite, one of three other newly discovered minerals in 1989 at the Grand Reef Mine site, has orthorhombic crystallography. Optically, grandreefite is an anisotropic mineral, meaning the velocity of light varies depending on the direction through which it is passing through the mineral. Its calculated relief, i.e. its relative difference in index of refraction compared to the surrounding medium's index of refraction, is 1.96–1.98; and its birefringence is .025.

Grandreefite, while not a valuable mineral in terms of commercial use, is useful in the sense that it is a good indicator of the very specific environment in which it forms and therefore the same conditions required to produce minerals similar to it in structure, composition, etc. For example, its structure is very similar to that of lanthanide oxide sulfates and therefore may be used to help better describe them. The Grand Reef Mine is located near a large granitic intrusion. Grandreefite is usually found in the mine in isolated veins containing hydrothermal copper, silver, and lead minerals hosted in oxidized breccias.
