= Isaac Adams =

Isaac Adams may refer to:

- Isaac Adams (inventor) (1802–1883), American inventor and politician in the Massachusetts Senate
  - Isaac Adams Jr. (1836–1911), his son, also an American inventor, a.k.a. Dr. Adams
- Isaac Adams (Maine politician) (1773–1834), politician from Portland, Maine
- Isaac Adams (Wisconsin politician) (1825–1879), American farmer and politician
