= Nickel double salts =

Class of chemical compounds

Nickel can form various double salts.

== Tutton's salts ==
Nickel is one of the metals that can form Tutton's salts. The singly charged ion can be any of the full range of potassium, rubidium, cesium, ammonium (NH_{4}), or thallium.

=== Mineral forms ===
As a mineral the ammonium nickel salt, (NH_{4})_{2}Ni(SO_{4})_{2} · 6 H_{2}O, can be called nickelboussingaultite. With sodium, the double sulfate is nickelblödite Na_{2}Ni(SO_{4})_{2} · 4 H_{2}O from the blödite family. Nickel can be substituted by other divalent metals of similar sized to make mixtures that crystallise in the same form.

== Langbeinites ==
Anhydrous salts of the formula M_{2}Ni_{2}(SO_{4})_{3}, which can be termed metal nickel trisulfates, belong to the family of langbeinites. The known salts include (NH_{4})_{2}Ni_{2}(SO_{4})_{3}, K_{2}Ni_{2}(SO_{4})_{3} and Rb_{2}Ni_{2}(SO_{4})_{3}, and those of Tl and Cs are predicted to exist.

== Double halides ==
=== Fluorides ===
Double fluorides include the fluoroanion salts, and those fluoronickelates such as NiF_{4} and NiF_{6}:

- KNiF_{3}·H_{2}O and NaNiF_{3}·H_{2}O – apple green coloured
- aluminium nickel pentafluoride (AlNiF_{5}·7H_{2}O)
- ceric nickelous decafluoride (Ce_{2}NiF_{10}·7H_{2}O)
- niobium nickel fluoride (Ni_{3}H_{4}Nb_{2}F_{20}·19H_{2}O)
- vanadium nickel pentafluoride (VNiF_{5}·7H_{2}O)
- vanadyl nickel tetrafluoride (VONiF_{4}·7H_{2}O)
- chromic nickelous pentafluoride (CrNiF_{5}·7H_{2}O)
- molybdenum nickel dioxytetrafluoride (NiMoO_{2}F_{4}·6H_{2}O)
- tungsten nickel dioxytetrafluoride hexahydrate (NiWO_{2}F_{4}·6H_{2}O) and decahydrate (NiWO_{2}F_{4}·10H_{2}O)
- manganic nickel pentafluoride (MnNiF_{4}·7H_{2}O)
- nickelous ferric fluoride (FeNiF_{5}·7H_{2}O)

=== Chlorides ===
==== Trichlorides ====
Nickel trichloride double salts exist which are polymers. Nickel is in octahedral coordination, with double halogen bridges. Examples of this include RbNiCl_{3}, pinkish tan coloured H_{2}NN(CH_{3})_{3}NiCl_{3}.

Other double trichlorides include:

- potassium nickel trichloride (KNiCl_{3}·5H_{2}O)
- yellow cesium nickel trichloride (CsNiCl_{3})
- lithium nickel trichloride (LiNiCl_{3}·3H_{2}O)
- nickel ammonium chloride hexahydrate (NH_{4}NiCl_{3}·6H_{2}O)

==== Tetrachlorides ====
The tetrachloronickelates contain a tetrahedral NiCl_{4}^{2−} and are dark blue. Some salts of organic bases are ionic liquids at standard conditions. Tetramethylammonium nickel trichloride is pink and very insoluble.

Other tetrachlorides include:

- hyrdrazinium nickel tetrachloride
- lithium nickel tetrachloride (Li_{2}NiCl_{4}·4H_{2}O) – stable from 23 to 60°
- rubidium nickel tetrachloride
- stannous nickel tetrachloride (SnCl_{2}·NiCl_{2}·6H_{2}O)

==== Hexachlorides ====
Double hexachlorides include:

- cadmium dinickel hexachloride (CdCl_{2}•2NiCl_{2}•12H_{2}O) – crystallises in hexagonal system
- dicadmium dinickel hexachloride (2CdCl_{2}•NiCl_{2}•12H_{2}O) – rhombic crystals, pleochroic varying from light to dark green.
- lithium nickel hexachloride Li_{4}NiCl_{6}·10H_{2}O – stable from 0 to 23°
- stannic nickel hexachloride (SnCl_{4}·NiCl_{2}·6H_{2}O) – tetragonal

==== Octochlorides ====
Thallic nickel octochloride 2TlCl_{3}·NiCl_{2}·8H_{2}O is bright green.

==== Oxychlorides ====
Copper nickel dioxychloride 2CuO·NiCl_{2}·6H_{2}O and copper nickel trioxychloride 3CuO·NiCl_{2}·4H_{2}O exist.

=== Bromides ===
Double bromides include the tetrabromonickelates. Other salts include:

- caesium nickel tribromide (CsNiBr_{3})
- copper nickel trioxybromide (3CuO·NiBr_{2}·4H_{2}O)
- didymium nickel bromide (2(Pr,Nd)Br_{3}·3NiBr_{2}·18H_{2}O) – reddish brown, mixture of praseodymium and neodymium
- lanthanum nickel bromide (2LaBr3·3NiBr2·18H2O)
- mercuric nickel bromides (Hg_{2}NiBr6) and (HgNiBr_{4})
- mercuric nickel oxybromide (6NiO·NiBr_{2}•HgBr_{2}•20H_{2}O) – prepared by reacting nickel bromide with mercuric oxide
- nickel stannic bromide or nickel bromostannate (NiSnBr_{6}·8H_{2}O) – apple green

=== Iodides ===
The tetraiodonickelates are blood-red coloured salts of the NiI_{4} ion with large cations. The diperiodatonickelates of nickel(IV) are strong oxidisers, and akali monoperiodatonickelates also are known.

Double iodides include:

- mercuric nickel hexaiodide (2HgI_{2}·NiI_{2} · 6 H_{2}O)
- mercuric nickel tetraiodide (HgI_{2}·NiI_{2} · 6 H_{2}O)
- lead nickel hexaiodide (I_{2}·2NiI_{2} · 3 H_{2}O)

== Double nitrates ==
=== Lanthanides ===
Nickel forms double nitrates with the lighter rare-earth elements. The solid crystals have the formula Ni_{3}Me_{2}(NO_{3})_{12}•24H_{2}O. The metals include La, Ce, Pr, Nd, Sm, Gd and the non rare earth Bi. Nickel can also be replaced by similar divalent ions Mg, Mn, Co, and Zn. For the nickel salts melting temperatures range from 110.5° for La, 108.5° for Ce, 108° for Pr, 105.6° for Nd, 92.2° for Sm and down to 72.5° for Gd, the Bi salt melting at 69°. Crystal structure is hexagonal with Z=3. Ni_{3}La_{2}(NO_{3})_{12}•24H_{2}O becomes ferromagnetic below 0.393 K. These double nickel nitrates have been used to separate the rare earth elements by fractional crystallization.

=== Actinides ===
Nickel thorium nitrate has formula NiTh(NO_{3})_{6} · 8 H_{2}O. Nickel atoms can be substituted by other ions with radius 0.69 to 0.83 Å. The nitrates are coordinated on the thorium atom and the water to the nickel. Enthalpy of solution of the octahydrate is 7 kJ/mol. Enthalpy of formation is -4360 kJ/mol. At 109° the octahydrate becomes NiTh(NO_{3})_{6}•6H_{2}O, and at 190° NiTh(NO_{3})_{6}•3H_{2}O and anhydrous at 215°. The hexahydrate has Pa3̅ cubic structure.

== Double nitrites ==
The nitronickelates are a class of chemical compounds containing a nickel atom complexed by nitro groups, –NO_{2}. Nickel can be in a +2 or +3 oxidation state. There can be five (pentanitronickelates), or six, (hexanitronickelates) nitro groups per nickel atom. They can be considered the double nitrites of nickel nitrite.

== Double amides ==
Various double amides containing nickel clusters have been made using liquid ammonia as a solvent. These are called amidonickel compounds.

These include:

- Li_{3}Ni_{4}(NH_{2})_{11}·NH_{3} (Pna21; Z = 4; a = 16.344(3) Å; b = 12.310(2) Å; c = 8.113(2) Å v=1631 D=1.942) – red
- Li_{4}Ni_{4}(NH_{2})_{12}·NH_{3}, Na_{2}Ni(NH_{2})_{4}
- Na_{2}Ni(NH_{2})_{4}•NH_{3}
- Na_{2}Ni(NH_{2})_{4}•2NH_{3} – orange red
- K_{2}Ni(NH_{2})_{4}•0.23KNH_{2}
- Rb_{2}Ni(NH_{2})_{4}•0.23RbNH_{2}
- Cs_{2}Ni(NH_{2})_{4}•NH_{3} (P21/c; Z = 4; a =9.553(3) Å; b = 8.734(3) Å; c = 14.243(3) Å; β = 129.96(3)° V=910 D=2.960)

== Double hydrides ==
Double hydrides of nickel exist, such as Mg_{2}NiH_{4}.

== Double dihydrogen phosphides ==
Nickel dihydrogen phosphide (Ni(PH_{2})_{2}) can form orange, green or black double salts KNi(PH_{2})_{3}) that crystallise from liquid ammonia. They are unstable above -78 °C, giving off ammonia, phosphine and hydrogen.

== Double tetrafluoroberyllates ==
Nickel forms double salts with Tutton's salt structure with tetrafluoroberyllate and a range of cations including ammonia, potassium, rubidium, cesium, and thallium.

== Other minerals ==
Some minerals are double salts, for example nickelzippeite Ni_{2}(UO_{2})_{6}(SO_{4})_{3}(OH)_{10} · 16H_{2}O which is isomorphic to cobaltzippeite, magnesiozippeite and zinczippeite, part of the zippeite group.

== Table of nickel double salts ==
formula	name	mol	struct	cell Å			°	V	Z	density	colour	refs
		wt		a	b	c	β	Å^{3}		g/cm^{3}		
Li_{2}[NiF(PO_{4})]	Lithium nickel fluorophosphate	186.56	orthorhombic	10.473	6.289	10.846		714.3	8	3.469		
Na_{2}[NiF(PO_{4})]	sodium nickel fluorophosphate	218.645	Pbcn				90	823.4				
Na_{2}Ni(SO_{4})_{2} · 4 H_{2}O	nickelblödite	368.867	monoclinic	11.045	8.193	5.535	100.50			2.487	green	
K_{2}Ni_{2}(SO_{4})_{3}	potassium nickel trisulfate	483.77	orthorhombic	9.8436	9.8436	9.8436	90			3.369		
Rb_{2}Ni_{2}(SO_{4})_{3}	rubidium nickel trisulfate	576.51		9.9217	9.9217	9.9217	90			3.921		
(NH_{4})_{2}Ni_{2}(SO_{4})_{3}	ammonium nickel trisulfate	441.65	orthorhombic	9.904	9.904	9.904	90			3.02		
(NH_{4})_{4}Ni_{3}(SO_{4})_{5}	ammonium nickel pentasulfate	728.56									yellow	
NiLa(SeO_{3})_{2}Cl	nickel lanthanum diselenite chloride	486.977	hexagonal	8.666		18.662		1194.2	6		(153K)	
NiNd_{10}(SeO_{3})_{12}Cl_{8}	nickel Neodymium diselenite chloride		monoclinic	15.8175	1578,68	19.276	114.202	7407	4		(153K)	
Ni_{6}Fe^{3+}_{2}(SO_{4})(OH)_{16} · 4 H_{2}O	honessite	904.08	trigonal	3.083		26.71		219.86	0.25	1.71	green	
NiTi(SO_{4})_{3}	nickel titanium sulfate		monoclinic	8.254	8.54	14.1444	124.967	817	4	3.21		
Na_{2}Ni(SeO_{4})_{2} · 2 H_{2}O	sodium nickel selenate dihydrate		triclinic	5.507	5.905	7.172	α = 108.56 °, β = 99.07 °, γ = 106.35 °	204.2	1			
K_{2}Ni(SeO_{4})_{2} · 2 H_{2}O	potassium nickel selenate dihydrate											
K_{2}Ni(SeO_{4})_{2} · 6 H_{2}O	potassium nickel selenate Tuttons salt	527.52	monoclinic	a	b	c	104.45		4	2.559	bright green	
Rb_{2}Ni(SeO_{4})_{2} · 6 H_{2}O	rubidium nickel selenate Tuttons salt	619.62	monoclinic	a	b	c	105.20		4	2.856	bright green	
Cs_{2}Ni(SeO_{4})_{2} · 6 H_{2}O	caesium nickel selenate Tuttons salt	713.62	monoclinic	9.426	12.961	6.473	106.17	759.5	2	3.114	bright emerald green	
(NH_{4})_{2}Ni(SeO_{4})_{2} · 6 H_{2}O	ammonium nickel selenate Tuttons salt	485.68	monoclinic	a	b	c	106.29		4	2.243	bright green	
Tl_{2}Ni(SeO_{4})_{2} · 6 H_{2}O	thallium nickel selenate Tuttons salt		monoclinic	a	b	c	105.60		4	3.993	bright green	
K_{2}NiP_{2}O_{7}		310.85	monoclinic P2_{1}	9.230	17.540	8.32	91.44	1346.3	8	3.067		
K_{6}Sr_{2}Ni_{5}(P_{2}O_{7})_{5}		786.55	monoclinic P2_{1}/c	11.038	9.53	7.438	100.13	1578	2	3.309	yellow	
NaNi_{2}(SO_{4})_{2}[(H_{2}O)(OH)]			monoclinic C2/m Natrochalcite-type	8.605	6.185	7.336	114.78	354.5	2			
BaNi_{2}(PO_{4})_{2}	barium nickel phosphate		Trigonal R-3	4.8112	4.8112	23.302		467.1	3		green	
BaNi_{2}(AsO_{4})_{2}	barium nickel arsenate		Trigonal R-3	4.945	4.945	23.61		532.59	3	5.31		
BaNi_{2}(VO_{4})_{2}	barium nickel vanadate		Trigonal R-3	5.0375	5.0375	22.33			3			
Na_{4}Ni_{7}(AsO_{4})_{6}	tetrasodium heptanickel hexaarsenate	1336.3	monoclinic C2/m	14.538	14.505	10.6120	118.299	1970.3	4		brown	
K_{2}Ni(CO_{3})_{2} · H_{2}O	potassium nickel carbonate Potassium tetraaquadicarbonatonickelate		monoclinic Baylissite-type	6.755	6.156	12.2406	113.265	467.6	2	2.34		
Rb_{2}Ni(CO_{3})_{2} · H_{2}O	Rubidium nickel carbonate		monoclinic Baylissite-type	6.971	6.348	12.2807	114.289	495.34	2	2.83		
NiTh(NO_{3})_{6} · 8 H_{2}O	nickel thorium nitrate		Monoclinic P2_{1}/c	9.089	8.728	13.565	96.65	1068.8(2)				
K[NiGa_{2}(PO_{4})_{3}(H_{2}O)_{2}]	Potassium nickel(II) gallium phosphate hydrate	558.17	Monoclinic C2/c	13.209	10.173	8.813	107.68	1128.4	Z = 4			
KNi_{3}(PO_{4})P_{2}O_{7}	Potassium trinickel(II) orthophosphate diphosphate	484.14	Monoclinic	9.8591	9.3953	9.9778	118.965	808.63	4			
KNiPO_{4}	potassium nickel phosphate											
KNiPO_{4} · 6 H_{2}O	potassium nickel phosphate hexahydrate		monoclinic P2_{1}	6.8309	11.0610	6.1165	91.045	462.07	2			
NiK_{4}(P_{3}O_{9})_{2} · 7 H_{2}O	nickel potassium tricyclophosphate hydrate		orthorhombic Fm2m	23.03	11.882	8.732			4		blue	
NiK_{4}(P_{3}O_{9})_{2}	nickel potassium tricyclophosphate		triclinic P-1	6.143	6.80	12.80	α=102.8 β=89.7 γ=66.03	473.56	1			
NaK_{5}Ni_{5}(P_{2}O_{7})_{4}	Sodium pentapotassium pentanickel tetra(diphosphate)	1207.80	triclinic	7.188	9.282	10.026(5)	α=109.31 β=90.02 γ=104.07	610.0	1			
NH_{4}NiPO_{4}·H_{2}O	ammonium nickel phosphate hydrate		orthorhombic	5.566	8.760	4.742		231.2				
NH_{4}NiPO_{4}·6H_{2}O	ammonium nickel phosphate hydrate Ni-struvite		Orthorhombic Pmn2_{1}	6.924	6.104	11.166		471.5	2			
LiNiPO_{4}	lithium nickel phosphate		orthorhombic	10.032	5.855	4.681		274.9	4		brown	
NaNiPO_{4}	sodium nickel phosphate		Pnma maricite structure	8.7839	6.7426	5.0368		298.31	4		yellow	
NaNiPO_{4}	sodium nickel phosphate		Pnma triphylite form	4.98	6.13	9.98		304.23				
Na_{4}Ni_{7}(PO_{4})_{6}			Cm	10.550	13.985	6.398	104.87	912.4	2	3.906		
NaNiPO_{4} · 7 H_{2}O	sodium nickel phosphate heptahydrate		tetrahedral P4_{2}/mmc	6.7390		10.9690		498.15	2			
Na_{3}NiP_{3}O_{10} · 12 H_{2}O	trisodium nickel triphosphate dodecahydrate		monoclinic (pseudoorthorhombic)	15.0236	9.1972	14.6654.	90.0492	2014.46		1.967	light green	
Na_{5}Ni_{2}(PO_{4})_{3} · H_{2}O	Pentasodium dinickel triphosphate hydrate		monoclinic space group P2_{1}/n	14.0395	5.185	16.4739	110.419					
Na_{6}Ni_{2}(PO_{4})_{3}OH			orthorhombic Pcmb	7.501	21.4661	7.173						
Na_{2}Ni_{3}(OH)_{2}(PO_{4})_{2}	sodium nickel hydroxide phosphate		monoclinic	14.259	5.695	4.933	104.28		2	3.816		
NiNa_{4}(P_{3}O_{9})_{2} · 6 H_{2}O	nickel tetrasodium cyclotriphosphate hexahydrate		triclinic	6.157	6.820	10.918	α=80.21 β=97.8 γ=119.5	409.8	1			
NiRb_{4}(P_{3}O_{9})_{2}	nickel tetrarubidium cyclotriphosphate		P-31c	7.288	7.288	20.343			2			
NiCs_{4}(P_{3}O_{9})_{2} · 6 H_{2}O	nickel tetracaesium cyclotriphosphate hydrate		orthorhombic	19.992	6.500	18.445			4			
NiCs_{4}(PO_{3})_{6}	nickel tetracaesium cyclotriphosphate		rhombohedral P-3_{1}c	11.602	11.602	9.078		1058.24	2			
NiAg_{4}(P_{3}O_{9})_{2} · 6 H_{2}O	nickel tetrasilver cyclotriphosphate hexahydrate		triclinic	9.209	8.053	6.841	α=89.15 β=102.94 γ=97.24		1			
NiAg_{4}(P_{3}O_{9})_{2}	nickel tetrasilver cyclotriphosphate		triclinic	6.100	6.783	10.764	α = 78.66 β=96.85 γ=113.36	401	1			
Ni(NH_{4})_{4}(P_{3}O_{9})_{2} · 4 H_{2}O	nickel tetraammonium cyclotriphosphate tetrahydrate		monoclinic						2			
TlNi_{4}(PO_{4})_{3}	Thallium nickel triphosphate		orthorhombic Cmc2_{1}						4		pale yellow	
Tl_{4}Ni_{6}(PO_{4})_{6}	Thallium nickel hexaphosphate		monoclinic Cm						4		yellow brown	
Tl_{2}Ni_{4}P_{2}O_{7}(PO_{4})_{2}			monoclinic C2/c						8		brown	
NiMnSb	Nickel manganese antimonide		cubic	5.945				210.1	4	7.57		
NiMnSi	Nickel manganese silicide		Orthorhombic	5.8967	3.6124	6.9162		147.32	4			
NiMnGe			orthorhombic Pnma	6.053	3.769	7.090		161.75	2			
NiFeGe			hexagonal									
TiNiSi			orthorhombic									
NaNiIO_{6}	sodium nickel periodate		orthorhombic	8.599	2.492	10.281		220.3				
KNiIO_{6}	potassium nickel periodate		orthorhombic	12.09	3.683	6.062		269.9				
KNiIO_{6}	potassium nickel periodate		triclinic	6.4203	5.075	4.223	α= 65.07 β= 92.717 γ=109.95	116.51				
