= Downtown Waterville Historic District =

- U.S. National Register of Historic Places
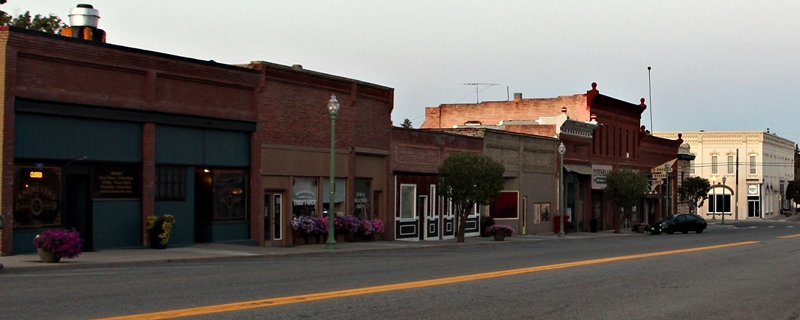
- Downtown Waterville Historic District.

- Location within Washington (state)
- Location: Locust and Chelan Sts., Waterville, Washington
- Coordinates: 47.64737°N 120.07175°W
- Area: 3 acres (1.2 ha)
- Architect: Calhoun,J.C.; Et al.
- NRHP reference No.: 88000629
- Added to NRHP: May 19, 1988

The Downtown Waterville Historic District is a designated historic district in Waterville, Washington, United States. It was constructed between 1891 and World War I, as an agricultural trade center. The district includes most of the brick commercial blocks in the city center including general stores, fraternal halls, and banks. The district is distinguished by the use of local brick, cornices, arched fenestration, iron storefronts, and other period details. The buildings form the finest example of turn of the century commercial architecture in the county and are an outstanding reflection of a small city on the agricultural frontier.

== History ==
Settled in 1883 by Stephen Boise, the land on which Waterville was built was purchased in 1885 by A.T. Greene. Along with surveyor J.M. Snow, laid plans for a townsite. In October 1886, the town plat was filed by a board of trustees. Named for the wells on the property. Waterville designed on a grid. Lots were reserved for the county courthouse, town hall, churches, fraternal lodges, schools, and a public "park square." A month after the plat was filed, the Douglas County seat was moved from Okanogan. In the spring of 1887, blacksmith E.E. Stowell moved his forge and tools from Badger Mountain. A second frame structure was completed for Snow and served as temporary courthouse and post office. Before the year was over, E.L. Rogers and M.B. Howe began a general store. By the spring of 1888, only eight structures marked the townsite. The first of several boom periods began in the summer of 1888. The town grew with the addition of fraternal societies, churches; a variety of shops; and a flour mill. Greene and his wife donated a frame courthouse to the community. With a population of nearly 350 residents, the city of Waterville was officially incorporated in the spring of 1889.

By 1890 Waterville had nearly 600 inhabitants. The business district ranged along Locust, Ash, and Walnut Streets. In 1891 a municipal electrical system was established and the following year, a city water system was created as wells as the fire department organized.

=== Commercial district ===
By 1890 the frame structures downtown were considered temporary and a fire hazard. With the opening in 1889 of a brick yard in town, ‘fire proof’ buildings became affordable. In 1891 the first commercial brick building was built at the northeast corner of Locust Street and Chelan Avenue. The First National Bank, Oddfellows Lodge, and Kincaid block established a new scale and character for downtown. A consolidation of three owners (the First National Bank, the Oddfellows Lodge, and town father J.M. Kincaid), the two-story structure had elaborate storefronts and decorative cornice. This single structure brought together a general store, the town's two banks, a fraternal hall, and the office of the United States Land Office.

The wheat boom of 1900 had a major impact on the city. In 1903, the city council granted the "park square" to the developers who built the two-story Waterville Hotel. In 1905, a brick courthouse was constructed after the previous structure burned. This second boom (1902 until 1905) resulted in new construction along Locust Street near the intersection with Chelan. Between 1902 and 1903, seven buildings were constructed, usually with Waterville brick. Among the new businesses was the mercantile of Rogers and Howe, the two-story hardware shop of Carpenter and Maltbie and Waterville State Bank in the buildings corner. Also new were the Fair Store of William Dunn. With the new construction, the city council (which included prominent district merchants like Rogers, Howe, Guibert, Maltbie, and Dunn) passed a series of ordinances to improve the city. The ordinances enforced rubbish collection, restrained wild hogs, limited saloons and brothels, and created a brick only fire district in the heart of the business district. By 1903, the new brick blocks were mostly complete. Additional plans were laid for a new bank, another hardware store, and more construction. By the end of the decade, the district included a large bank building and more brick storefronts. The city had seven churches, nine lodges, three hardware stores, two newspapers, a flour mill, and a high school. But construction downtown subsided after 1915, and the commercial district today closely resembles the district as it appeared at the outset of World War I.

=== Architecture ===
The historic district contains nearly all of the brick commercial buildings in town. The predominance of brick distinguishes the district. Only one contributing buildings is not built with brick bearing walls. The brickwork is common or stretcher bond. The local brick yards, established in 1889, provided the bricks. This concentration of buildings was built in a small segment of time, with half were built in 1902 and 1903. Several of the structures use party or shared walls and were built by the same builders. The oldest structure is the First National Bank/Kincaid/IOOF Block. It was the first large brick block, built in 1891. It is built on three contiguous lots, each with separate owners. A single builder built the integrated, two-story building, using three bays. The building is 80 by 75 feet (24 by 23 m). The storefronts featured large plate glass windows with kickplates, iron columns and iron lintels. The upper floor has regularly spaced double-hung windows, brick hoods, and stone sills. The facade is decorated using brick piers between the bays, and a corbelled brick cornice.

The following decade, saw the frame structures rebuilt in brick. The district uniformly used one-and two-story buildings on both sides of Locust Street the west side of Chelan. Typically, buildings from the second period of growth (1902–1905) have storefront bays that measure 25 feet (7.6 m) wide and from 70 to 100 feet (21 to 30 m) deep. The storefronts use plate glass display windows beneath multi-light mezzanine or transom windows; iron lintels, on iron columns, span the bays. Brick piers, flank the windows and slightly project from facades, and are surmounted by brick courses or friezes with recessed panels. Many buildings are capped with a brick or metal cornice in the Victorian Italianate style. The Rogers and Howe Block and the Guibert Block, are examples of this "framed" storefront form. Later buildings (like the Knemeyer Saloon Building of 1914) use a simpler version of this style. The two-story structures have the framed storefront on the ground floor and regularly spaced windows on the second for the professional offices or meeting halls. Two buildings have a distinct stand out using different motifs. The Douglas County National Bank Building built in 1911 is a Neoclassical temple style. It is built of brick in a rusticated patterns with terra cotta trim. The bank has a full entablature and the entrance is framed by unfluted Doric columns. North of the bank is the Centennial Feed Building, the only frame structure in the district. It has a small gable roof using a false front and corrugated metal siding. The Centennial Building's style was once common.

=== Structures ===
The commercial district has all but one of the brick buildings constructed between 1890 and 1915. A hardware store adjacent to the First National Bank Block is missing. Many of the structures have lost their original interiors, i.e., pressed tin ceilings, wainscoting, and mezzanine level galleries. Their exteriors retain most of the defining features, i.e., metal cornices, double-hung wood sash windows, and iron storefront columns. The exterior alterations have been the street level storefronts. Commonly alteration have been done to the transoms, mezzanine windows, and display windows. The alterations are mostly overlays, retaining original storefront fabric.

==== Building #1 ====
First National Bank/Kincaid/IOOF Block at 101 North Chelan Avenue was built through 1891–1892 It is on the northeast corner of Locust Street and Chelan Avenue. The single structure is a three-part structure built of Waterville brick from Mike Eckert. It is designed in a vernacular style with both Romanesque Revival and Victorian Italianate details. The building was built with an 80 feet (24 m) facade on Chelan Avenue and a 75 feet (23 m) façade on Locust Street. In the early 20th century it was extended along the Chelan Avenue by 30 feet (9.1 m). Brick piers separate each bay, capped with a corbelled brick cornice. The upper level is pierced punctuated by double-hung, sash windows with segmental arched hoods and stone sills. The corner bay housed the bank and had an angled entry with large arched windows, fanlights and brick hoods. The eastern storefront on Chelan Avenue retains the iron columns and mezzanine windows.

- The three property owners agreed to a uniform style, scale, and material. The construction occurred with the establishment of a brick yard in the city; thus, it was Waterville's first major brick building.
- The First National Bank, which in the corner bay, was founded by W.R. Ballard, president; R.E. Steiner, Vice President; and W.L. Wilson, cashier. The first directors were A.R. Foote, A.T. Greene, A.L. Rogers, and M.B. Howe. It was capitalized at $50,000 and opened in March 1891. The bank operated on the ground floor and rented out the upstairs offices to the Masonic lodge (Badger Mountain Lodge in 1889). In 1905, the Masons purchased the building. The Masons had been using the IOOF hall next door.
- The Kincaid Block was built for James Kincaid, an original settler. who helped plat the town. Kincaid rented spaces to a variety of businesses, including clothing shops, dry goods stores, and a boot and shoe firm. In the early 20th century renters included the Alexander Mercantile Company and Armory Hall.

The Waterville IOOF chapter was founded in 1889. The lodge built a frame hall on this, but moved to build a brick hall in 1890, which opened in 1892. The lodge rented the ground floor to the Douglas County Bank and the United States General Land Office.

==== Building #2 ====
Waterville State Bank—Carpenter and Maltbie Block, at 107 West Locust Street was built from 1902 to 1903. This two-story building is 50 by 107 feet (15 by 33 m), with two street level storefronts on Locust. The cornice has a segmental arched fenestration. The storefronts still have the original iron lintels with iron columns. Brick piers rise through the second story to the roof line. A course of recessed brick panels forms a sill for the second-floor windows. A corbelled brick cornice and parapet crown the structure. The bank shares a party wall with the Fair building on the east. A decade after the construction of the First National Bank/Kincaid/IOOF Block on the northeast corner of Chelan and Locust was completed, construction of this structure began on the southwest corner. This building focused the intersection as a commercial hub.

Construction was completed in several stages. C.A. Carpenter and A.L. Maltbie started with a one-story brick building on the eastern for their hardware and implement business. The next year, they had torn down a frame structure on the corner and built a two-story building. During this stage, added a second story to the first brick building and connected them into a single structure. C.W. Moon directed a crew of brick layers and masons from Wenatchee. The bank was capitalized at $30,000 in 1907. C.T. Hansen served as the first bank president. The second floor was used as a carriage shop and, by 1909, as a theater and dance hall. By World War I, the post office occupied the rear storefront on Chelan Avenue.

==== Building #3 ====
The Fair Store Building at 102 West Locust Street was built in 1902–03 This one-story brick building shares a brick party wall with the Waterville State Bank also built in 1902. The building is 30 feet (9.1 m) by 107 feet (33 m). The street facade is a single large storefront with a recessed entry. The facade is framed by brick piers and surmounted by a paneled brick frieze and corbelled brick cornice. The original iron lintels and columns and the original plate glass display windows with kickplates remain as of 1988. C.W. Moon built this building, the Waterville Hotel and the adjoining Waterville State Bank at the same time. The building owned by R.E. Steiner, who designed it to house William Dunn's dry goods and clothing business. The shop was outfitted with a gallery, store shelving, and other conveniences. A machine shop was located in the basement.

==== Building #4 ====
Granis Harness and Saddlery Building at 104 West Locust Street was built in 1902–03. It was designed to go with the Fair Store. The Granis Building is a one-story structure 24 by 75 feet (7.3 by 22.9 m). The storefront is framed by brick piers with a brick frieze, corbelled cornice, and parapet. The original lintel and transom windows remain visible in the altered storefront. The Granis harness shop originally occupied the site with a restaurant here in 1922.

== Bibliography ==
- Big Bend Empire, Waterville, 1989–1910.
- Douglas County Press. Waterville, 1900–1920.
- R.L. Folk's Directory of Chelan and Douglas Counties. 1907, R.L. Polk, Seattle, 1907.
- Mrs. Doris Nelson, ed. "Big Bend in the Good Old Days," a series in the Empire Press. various dates (c. 1955–1970).
