= Nickel electroplating =

Surface coating

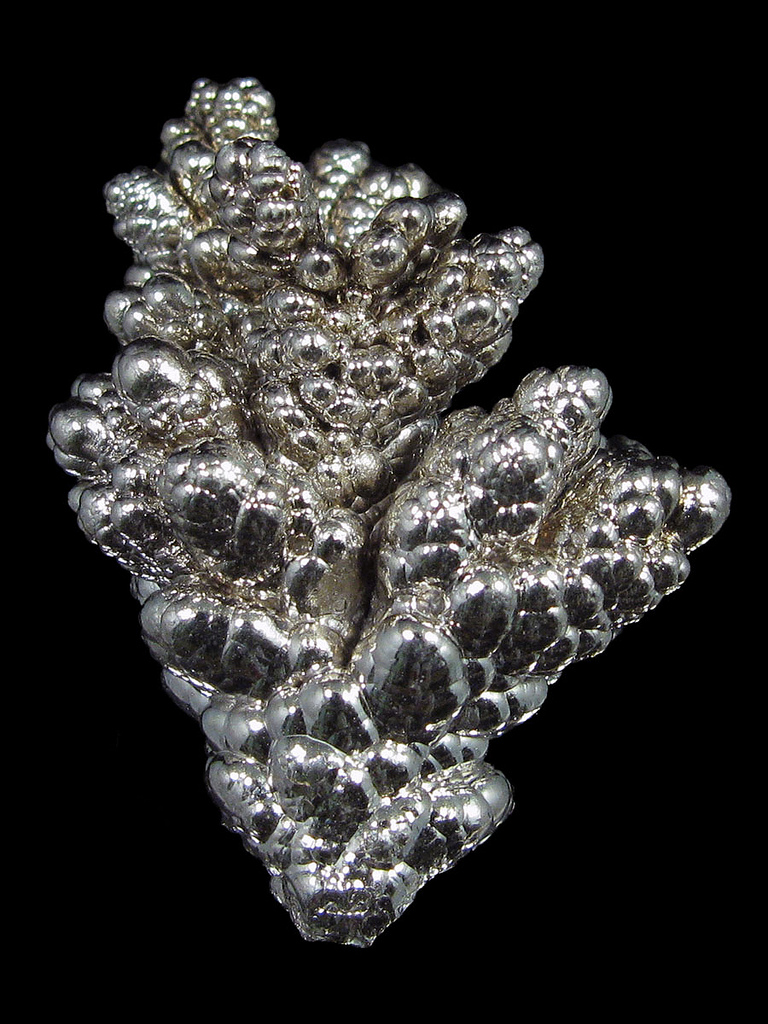
A nickel nodule produced through electrodeposition

Nickel electroplating is a technique of electroplating a thin layer of nickel onto a metal object. The nickel layer can be decorative, provide corrosion resistance, wear resistance, or used to build up worn or undersized parts for salvage purposes.

== Overview ==
Nickel electroplating is a process of depositing nickel onto a metal part. Parts to be plated must be clean and free of dirt, corrosion, and defects before plating can begin. To clean and protect the part during the plating process, a combination of heat treating, cleaning, masking, pickling, and etching may be used. Once the piece has been prepared it is immersed into an electrolyte solution and is used as the cathode. The nickel anode is dissolved into the electrolyte to form nickel ions (Ni^{2+}). Just like in other electrodeposition processes, the ions travel through the solution and deposit on the cathode.

The anode efficiency for nickel dissolution is close to 100%, unless the anode becomes passive due to problems with the process, in which case the efficiency drops to 0. The cathode efficiency depends on the process and varies between 90 and 97%. Due to this mismatch, during the plating the nickel concentration in the solution and the pH will slowly rise. The process takes minutes to hours depending on the current density and the intended thickness of the plating.

=== History ===
Nickel electroplating was developed in the first half of the 19th century, with notable experiments made by Golding Bird (1837) and nickel nitrate patent by Joseph Shore (1840). The first practical recipe, an aqueous solution of nickel and ammonium sulfates, was invented by Böttger in 1843 and was in use for 70 years. The commercial success was achieved by Isaac Adams Jr., whose patent for a solution of nickel ammonium sulfate, while similar to Böttger's, had neutral pH that made the process easier to control. Adams enjoyed a near-monopoly in nickel plating from 1869 to 1886, when the consumption of nickel for plating reached 135 tons. In the US, Remington tried to use the nickel ammonium chloride solution (1868), in the process establishing the anode construction in the form of a platinum basket filled with nickel pieces, Edward Weston initiated the use of boric acid (patent issued in 1878), Bancroft figured out the role of chlorides in dissolving the anode (1906). Finally, Oliver P. Watts in 1916 established the Watts bath, variations of which are still widely used for decorative plating, with sulfamate solutions challenging it in the engineering applications. In the early 1930s, German electrochemist Max Schlötter developed the first practical bright nickel bath. After discovering that using organic aromatic polysulfonates produced a dramatically improved finish, he filed a patent in the USA for bright nickel deposition in 1932 (US Patent 1972693).

== Types and chemistry ==
=== Watts baths ===
A Watts bath, named for its inventor Oliver Patterson Watts, is an aqueous electrolyte solution for plating nickel from a nickel anode. It can deposit both bright and semi-bright nickel. Bright nickel is typically used for decorative purposes and corrosion protection. Semi-bright deposits are used for engineering applications where high corrosion resistance, ductility or electrical conductivity is important, and a high luster is not required.

==== Bath composition ====
| Chemical Name | Formula | Bright | | Semi-bright | |
|---|---|---|---|---|---|
| Chemical Name | Formula | Metric | US | Metric | US |
| Nickel sulfate | NiSO_{4}·6H_{2}O | 150–300 g/L | 20–40 oz/gal | 225–300 g/L | 30–40 oz/gal |
| Nickel chloride | NiCl_{2}·6H_{2}O | 60–150 g/L | 8–20 oz/gal | 30–45 g/L | 4–6 oz/gal |
| Boric acid | H_{3}BO_{3} | 37–52 g/L | 5–7 oz/gal | 37–52 g/L | 5–7 oz/gal |

==== Operating conditions ====
- Temperature: 40-65 °C
- Cathode current density: 2-10 A/dm^{2}
- pH: 4.5-5

=== Brighteners ===
- Carrier brighteners (e.g. paratoluene sulfonamide, benzene sulphonic acid) in concentration 0.75-23 g/L. Carrier brighteners contain sulfur providing uniform fine grain structure of the nickel plating.
- Levelers, second class brighteners (e.g. allyl sulfonic acid, formaldehyde chloral hydrate) in concentration 0.0045-0.15 g/L produce (in combination with carrier brighteners) brilliant deposit.
- Auxiliary brighteners (e.g. sodium allyl sulfonate, pyridinium propyl sulfonate) in concentration 0.075-3.8 g/L.
- Inorganic brighteners (e.g. cobalt, zinc) in concentration 0.075-3.8 g/L. Inorganic brighteners impart additional lustre to the coating.

Type of the added brighteners and their concentrations determine the deposit appearance: brilliant, bright, semi-bright, satin.

=== Nickel sulfamate ===
Sulfamate nickel plating is used for many engineering applications. It is deposited for dimensional corrections, abrasion and wear resistance, high efficiency coating and corrosion protection. It is also used as an undercoat for chromium.

==== Bath composition ====
| Chemical name | Formula | Bath concentration | |
|---|---|---|---|
| Chemical name | Formula | Metric | US |
| Nickel sulfamate | Ni(SO_{3}NH_{2})_{2} | 300-450 g/L | 40–60 oz/gal |
| Nickel chloride | NiCl_{2}·6H_{2}O | 0-30 g/L | 0–4 oz/gal |
| Boric acid | H_{3}BO_{3} | 30-45 g/L | 4–6 oz/gal |

==== Operating conditions ====
- Temperature: 40-60 °C
- Cathode current density: 2-25 A/dm^{2}
- pH: 3.5-4.5

=== All-chloride ===
All-chloride solutions allow for the deposition of thick nickel coatings. They do this because they run at low voltages. However, the deposition has high internal stresses.

| Chemical name | Formula | Bath concentration |
|---|---|---|
| Nickel chloride | NiCl_{2}·6H_{2}O | 30–40 oz/gal |
| Boric acid | H_{3}BO_{3} | 4–4.7 oz/gal |

=== Sulfate-chloride ===
A sulfate-chloride bath operates at lower voltages than a Watts bath and provide a higher rate of deposition. Although internal stresses are higher than the Watts bath, they are lower than that of an all-chloride bath.

| Chemical name | Formula | Bath concentration |
|---|---|---|
| Nickel sulfate | NiSO_{4}·6H_{2}O | 20–30 oz/gal |
| Nickel chloride | NiCl_{2}·6H_{2}O | 20–30 oz/gal |
| Boric acid | H_{3}BO_{3} | 4–6 oz/gal |

=== All-sulfate ===
An all-sulfate solution is used for electro-depositing nickel where the anodes are insoluble. For example, plating the insides of steel pipes and fittings may require an insoluble anode.

| Chemical name | Formula | Bath concentration |
|---|---|---|
| Nickel sulfate | NiSO_{4}·6H_{2}O | 30–53 oz/gal |
| Boric acid | H_{3}BO_{3} | 4–6 oz/gal |

=== Hard nickel ===
A hard nickel solution is used when a high tensile strength and hardness deposit is required.

| Chemical name | Formula | Bath concentration | Metric |
|---|---|---|---|
| Nickel sulfate | NiSO_{4}·6H_{2}O | 24 oz/gal | 179.7g/L |
| Ammonium chloride | NH_{4}Cl | 3.3 oz/gal | 24.7 g/L |
| Boric acid | H_{3}BO_{3} | 4 oz/gal | 29.96 g/L |

=== Black nickel ===
"Black nickel" is a dark coating that consists primarily of nickel sulfide and metallic zinc and nickel. It is typically plated on brass, bronze, or steel in order to produce a non-reflective surface. This type of plating is used for decorative and military purposes and does not offer much protection.

| Chemical name | Formula | Bath concentration |
|---|---|---|
| Nickel ammonium sulfate | NiSO_{4}·(NH_{4})2SO_{4}·6H_{2}O | 8 oz/gal |
| Zinc sulfate | ZnSO_{4} | 1.0 oz/gal |
| Sodium thiocyanate | NaCNS | 2 oz/gal |

== Applications ==
=== Decorative coating ===
Decorative bright nickel is used in a wide range of applications. It offers a high luster finish, corrosion protection, and wear resistance. In the automotive industry bright nickel can be found on bumpers, rims, exhaust pipes and trim. It is also used for bright work on bicycles and motorcycles. Other applications include hand tools and household items such as lighting and plumbing fixtures, wire racks, firearms, and appliances.

Modern coating technology makes deposited nickel to appear mirror-bright with no need of polishing, multi-layer applications are frequently used to improve the corrosion resistance of coated steel, zinc, copper, aluminum, and other metals. In order to prevent tarnishing, decorative electroplated nickel is typically coated with a thin layer of chromium.

=== Engineering applications ===
Engineering nickel is used where brightness is not desired. Non decorative applications provide wear and corrosion protection as well as low-stress buildups for dimensional recovery, nickel or its nickel alloys usually having matte or dull finish. The method can be used for making nanocomposite wear resistance coatings.

Nickel electroforming has nickel plating applied for fabrication of nickel products. For example, nickel can be deposited onto a mandrel and then lifted off the latter, creating a nickel-only part.

Nickel is also used as an undercoat for chrome or gold plating, as it improves adhesion and the longevity of the final layer. In manufacturing and repair, nickel electroplating can also restore worn parts to their original dimensions, allowing them to function effectively without replacement.

== See also ==
- Electroless nickel immersion gold
- Electroless nickel plating
- Electroplating
- Chrome plating

== Sources ==
- Di Bari, George A. (14 February 2011). "Electrodeposition of nickel" (PDF). In Mordechay Schlesinger; Milan Paunovic (eds.). Modern Electroplating (5 ed.). John Wiley & Sons. pp. 79–114. ISBN 978-1-118-06314-9. OCLC 1037918105.
- Dubpernell, George (1959). "The story of nickel plating" [reprinted in Plating & Surface Finishing, April 2006, pp. 34-43] (PDF). Plating. 46 (6): 599–616.
- Nebiolo, William P. (August 2022). "The History of Electroplating And A Historical Review of the Evolution of NASF" (PDF). NASF Surface Technology White Papers. 86 (11). NASF: 1–14.
