= Waterville Hotel =

- U.S. National Register of Historic Places
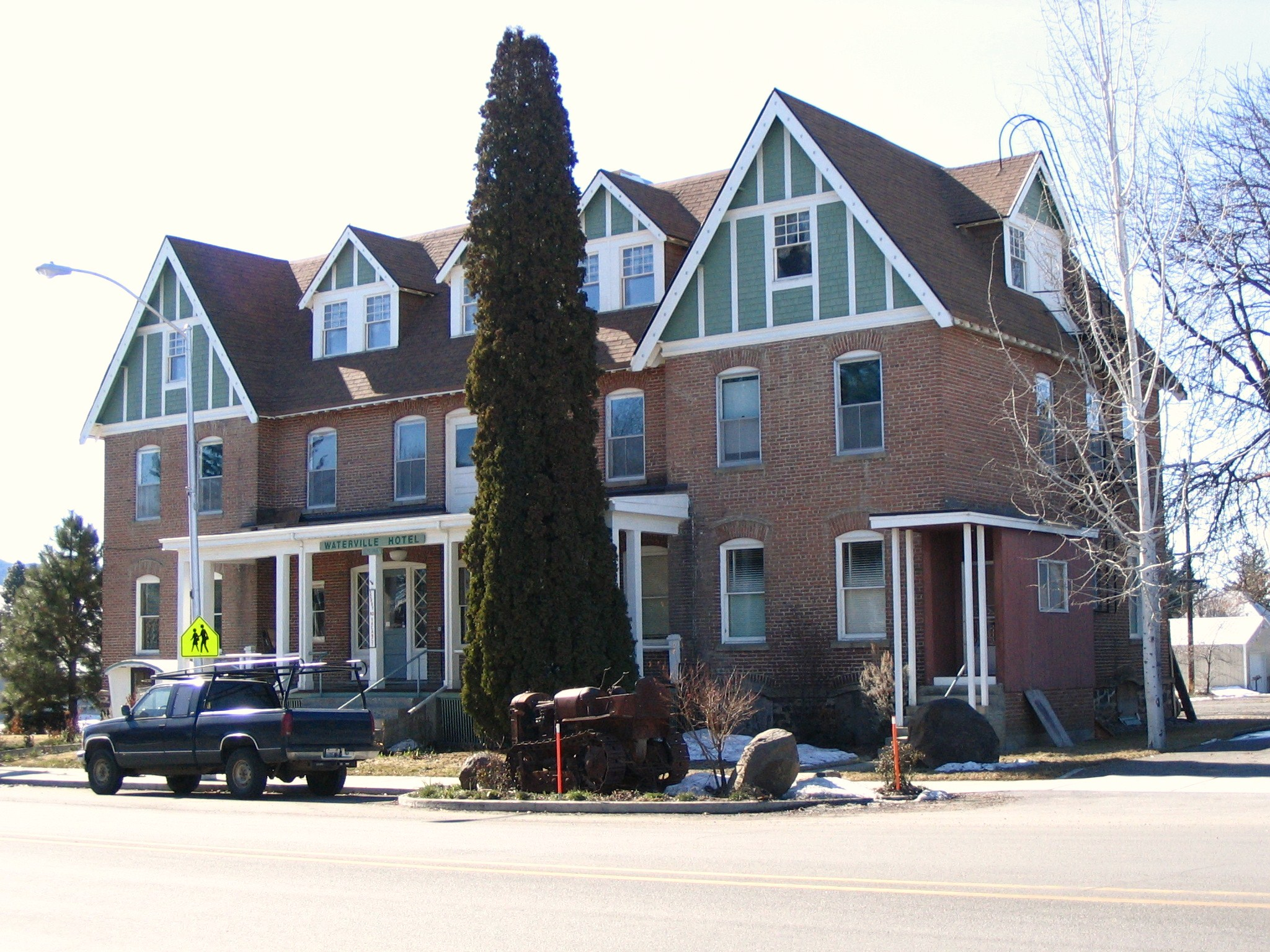
- The Waterville Hotel in Waterville, Washington.

- Location within Washington (state)
- Location: 102 S. Central St., Waterville, Washington
- Coordinates: 47.64688°N 120.07416°W
- Area: less than one acre
- Built: 1903
- Architectural style: Tudor Revival, Jacobethan Revival
- NRHP reference No.: 84000170
- Added to NRHP: October 18, 1984

The Waterville Hotel is a historic landmark and former hotel building in Waterville, Washington, United States. It was constructed in 1903.

== History ==
For several decades after it was erected in 1903, the Waterville Hotel was an important location in this small central Washington town. The hotel served as a center for social interaction. A group of investors formed a corporation in 1901 to build the hotel. The company was incorporated with a capital stock of from $10,000 to $12,000." Waterville was the Douglas County seat, and there were numerous people who came to town to transact business at the courthouse. The rooming houses, which served visitors were unable to meet the need. City officials deeded the public square to the new company for the hotel's site. As a convenient stop between Wenatchee and Coulee City on Highway 2, the new hotel became a weigh station for travelers, especially those not wishing to make a night drive down the steep, narrow, winding Pine Canyon Road to Wenatchee. The hotel was a popular stop for the tourists, salesmen, and politicians using Highway 2.

The hotel was the town's social and civic center. Its large dining room was the scene of town meetings, political rallies, and social gatherings. Fraternal organizations and the Commercial Club used the hotel on a regular basis for business meetings and social events. A weekly dance met with a band and refreshments. The hotel was the site where crowds of 100 to 150 people would gather to meet, listen to speeches, and discuss current issues. Outside of farming, the hotel was a large commercial operation in the county. The building had 33 rooms, of which ten deluxe rooms shared a bath with only one other room. In the 1940’s, deluxe rooms cost $2.50 per night. Standard rooms cost $1.00 per night with clean sheets and towels and the use of a public bath at the end of the hall. From 1931 to 1943 the hotel was managed by Pearl and Clayton Mayo. Pearl was a good cook, and the hotel flourished. A typical menu consisted of three types of roasts: veal, beef, and pork; and for 50 cents a patron could select a dinner consisting of meat, potatoes, two vegetables, salad, and pie. Fourteen to sixteen pies were made each day. The "merchant's lunch" was quick and cost 35 cents. Summers were the busiest, rooms nearly full and over 65 dinners served daily. The winter months saw fewer overnight stays, but they would still average over 100 people over the course of a day in the dining room.

In the summer visitors included tourists, salesmen, telephone linemen, state and county road crews, railroad executives, and officers of the Hypotheek Bank. The Dutch bank held many of the area farm mortgages. Single schoolteachers were often permanent guests. A chiropractor used his bedroom as an office and the Binyon Optical Company used the hotel as an operating base several times a month. The construction of Interstate 90 and changes in automobiles, and motel competition led to the decline in demand. It was finally closed in 1977. The Waterville Hotel is two and one-half story brick building in the Jacobethan Revival Style. Jacobethan includes the dormers, half timbering, arched windows, and a porch. The hotel is at the center of the town's original plat. The main street (Chelan Street) is two blocks east. The foundation is elevated using basalt boulders, from Douglas Creek, five miles to the east. The hotel is built with red bricks from A.C. Rogers kilns, one mile south of town. Rogers' kiln bricks were used for many of the Waterville buildings. These bricks are porous and weaker that other sources.

== Appearance ==
The hotel is "I" shaped with two gable-fronted end pavilions. The pavilions project minimally. The central core of the hotel and its roof form a cross-gable to those of the pavilions. The east face has a large wooden porch with wooden posts. The original balustrade over the porch roof was removed due to deterioration. The original wooden stoops have been replaced with concrete. The main entrance is from the porch through a wood and glass door flanked by sidelights. Most of the windows double-hung sash, beneath corbelled segmentally arched lintels. The brick lug sills were covered with a fine cement coating. A corbelled watertable was similarly finished.

The gable ends imitate half-timbering with exposed "framing" and wood shingles between the timbers. The bargeboards of the gable are ornamented. The roof has eight dormers: three on both the east and west facades and one each on the north and south. The dormers copy the decorative features of the pavilion gables.

Originally, the hotel roof was clad in asbestos sheeting. The original shed roof kitchen ell on the west facade has been altered with window sash and a wooden porch. Additional covered entrances were added to the northwest and northeast corners when the building was used as apartments. The additions were constructed in the 1950s of concrete block and pressed wood paneling. Other alterations include a simple porch on the south side that was built in the 1970s and a shed roof ell used for storage on the east side. In the 1930s, a long-enclosed wood and glass entrance was erected on the south corner of the main facade to service the hotel's basement restaurant. In the 1970s, the entrance cut in half and moved to the southern edge of the property for a shed.

The upper two floors have maintained their original appearance. The main floor and basement have been altered. The dining room and lobby were converted into apartments after 1938. The central stairway retains its square newel posts and turned balusters. Some of the lobby's leather and oak furniture remains in the building. The upper floors have a central hall with each room having an exterior window. The second floor has thirteen bedrooms approximately 12 by 12 feet (3.7 by 3.7 m) with 10 feet (3.0 m) ceilings. Each room has a double-hung window, paneled door with a glass transom and a sink. Two of the rooms have private bathrooms. There are three sets of two rooms that share bathrooms. There are two public toilets. The third floor also has thirteen bedrooms, approximately 8 by 8 feet (2.4 by 2.4 m) with 8 feet (2.4 m) ceilings. There are two public baths, and two sets of two rooms that share a bath. Original iron fire escape ladders remain the north and south facades. The plumbing on the top floors is original and includes porcelain sinks, nickel-plated fixtures, claw-foot bathtubs, and toilets with overhead tanks. Many details survive, including brass hardware, molded door and window surrounds, ornamented radiators, metal and glass ceiling lamps, turned wooden guards or protectors on the corners of walls and furniture such as dressers and iron beds. The simplicity with which elements are executed reflects the isolation and modest economy of the community. The detailing reflects a self-conscious attempt to build a stylish hotel. The main facade is well preserved and is a significant element of Waterville's landscape.

== Bibliography ==
- Big Bend Empire Press, March 14, July 25, 1901; April 9, April 23, December 17, 1903; August 3, 1905.
