= Isaac Adams (inventor) =

American inventor and politician (1802–1883)

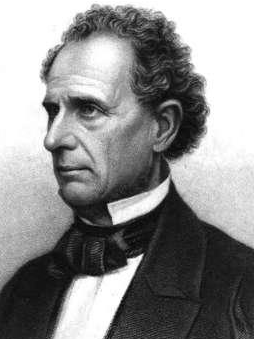
- Adams in 1857

Member of the Massachusetts Senate
- In office 1840

Personal details
- Born: August 16, 1802 Rochester, New Hampshire, U.S.
- Died: July 19, 1883 (aged 80) Sandwich, New Hampshire, U.S.
- Children: Isaac Jr., Julius and Elizabeth
- Occupation: Inventor, Politician
- Known for: Adams Power Press

Isaac Adams (August 16, 1802 – July 19, 1883) was an American inventor and politician. He served in the Massachusetts Senate and invented the Adams Power Press, which revolutionized the printing industry. His son, Isaac Adams Jr., invented the first commercial process for nickel electroplating.

== Biography ==
Adams was born in Rochester, New Hampshire, the son of Benjamin Adams and Elizabeth (Horne) Adams. His education was limited, and at an early age he was an operative in a cotton factory. Afterward he learned the trade of cabinet maker, but in 1824 went to Boston and sought work in a machine shop.

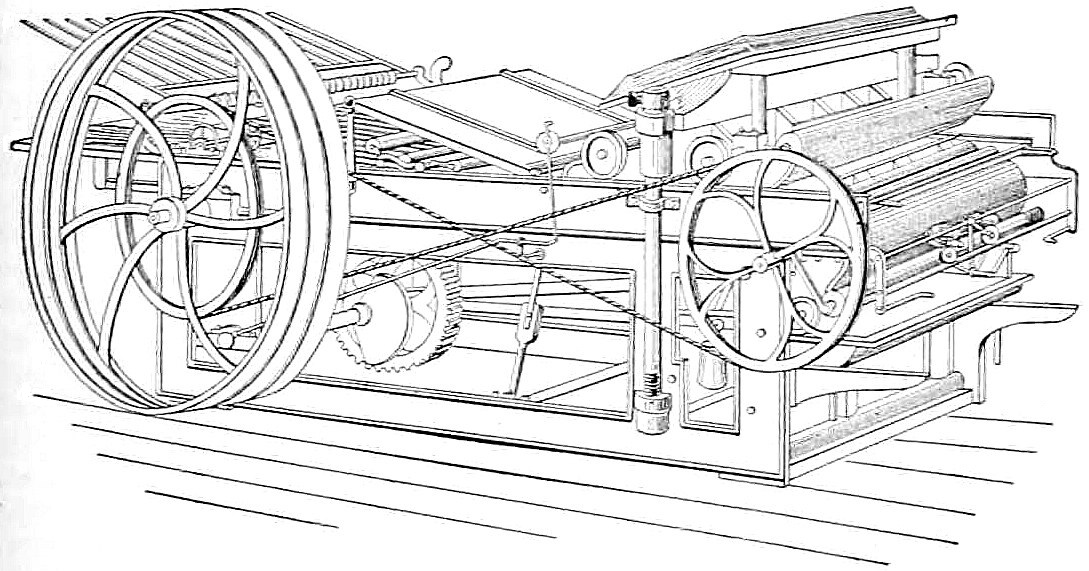
Line drawing of the Adams power bed and platen press

In 1828 he and invented the Adams printing press, which he improved in 1834, and it was introduced in 1830 as "Adams Power Press". The machine "worked a revolution in the art of printing," and beginning in 1836, became the leading machine used in book printing for much of the nineteenth century, and was distributed worldwide. It substantially reduced the cost of book production, and made books more widely available.

With his brother Seth, a noted sugar refiner, Adams engaged in the manufacture of printing presses, sugar mills, steam engines (stationary and marine), steam boilers and other machines, and formed the company I. & S. Adams in 1836.

He was a member of the Massachusetts Senate in 1840, and the Emigrant Aid Company. His last years were spent in retirement. He died on July 19, 1883.

== Sources ==
- Bowdoin College (1902). General Catalogue of Bowdoin College and the Medical School of Maine. Brunswick, Maine: University of Chicago. p. 214. OCLC 49442457.
- Dubpernell, George (1959). "The story of nickel plating" [reprinted in Plating & Surface Finishing, April 2006, pp. 34-43] (PDF). Plating. 46 (6): 599–616.
- Nebiolo, William P. (August 2022). "The History of Electroplating And A Historical Review of the Evolution of NASF" (PDF). NASF Surface Technology White Papers. 86 (11). NASF: 1–14.
