= Oliver Patterson Watts =

American scientist

Oliver Patterson Watts (July 16, 1865 – February 6, 1953) was a professor of chemical engineering and applied electrochemistry at the University of Wisconsin–Madison. Born in Thomaston, Maine, Watts received his bachelor's degree from Bowdoin College in 1889. He received his doctoral degree in 1905; he was the first person to be awarded a Ph.D. in chemical engineering at the University of Wisconsin, where he served as a professor until 1935, after which he was an emeritus professor in the university's college of engineering. Watts is known for his development of the hot nickel plating bath known as the "Watts Bath", which he first described in a paper published in 1915.
