= Chromium chloride =

Chromium chloride may refer to:

- Chromium(II) chloride, also known as chromous chloride
- Chromium(III) chloride, also known as chromic chloride or chromium trichloride
- Chromium(IV) chloride, unstable
