= Nickel(II) nitrite =

Names
- IUPAC name Nickel(II) nitrite
- Other names nickel dinitrite

Identifiers
CAS Number	17861-62-0
3D model (JSmol)	Interactive image
ChemSpider	20127081
PubChem CID	20831815
RTECS number	RA1080000
UN number	2726
CompTox Dashboard (EPA)	DTXSID40939103
- InChI: InChI=1S/2HNO2.Ni/c2*2-1-3;/h2*(H,2,3);/q;;+2/p-2 Key: ZVHHIDVFSYXCEW-UHFFFAOYSA-L
- SMILES: N(=O)[O-].N(=O)[O-].[Ni+2]

Properties
Chemical formula	Ni(NO_{2})_{2}
Molar mass	150.73 g/mol
Appearance	blue-green crystals
Density	8.90 g/cm^{3} (20 °C)
Solubility in water	very soluble
- Except where otherwise noted, data are given for materials in their standard state (at 25 °C [77 °F], 100 kPa). Infobox references

Nickel(II) nitrite is an inorganic compound with the chemical formula Ni(NO_{2})_{2}. Anhydrous nickel nitrite was first discovered in 1961 by Cyril Clifford Addison, who allowed gaseous nickel tetracarbonyl to react with dinitrogen tetroxide, yielding a green smoke. Nickel nitrite was the second transition element anhydrous nitrite discovered after silver nitrite.

== Properties ==
Nickel nitrite decomposes when heated to 220 °C, however it can be heated up to 260 °C in argon. The nitrite is covalently bonded to nickel, and the material is slightly volatile. The infrared spectrum of the solid has absorption bands at 1575, 1388, 1333, 1240, 1080, and 830 cm^{−1}. Liquid dinitrogen tetroxide oxidises nickel nitrite to nickel nitrate.

=== In solution ===
When nickel nitrite dissolves in water, different mixed nitro-aqua complexes form such as Ni(NO_{2})_{2}(H_{2}O)_{4}, Ni(NO_{2})_{3}(H_{2}O)^{−}_{3}, and Ni(NO_{2})(H_{2}O)^{+}_{5}.

The aqueous complex Ni(NO_{2})_{2}(H_{2}O)_{4} forms when an alkali metal nitrite is added to a nickel salt solution:

Ni(H_{2}O)^{2+}_{6} + 2 NO^{−}_{2} ⇌ Ni(NO_{2})_{2}(H_{2}O)_{4} + 2 H_{2}O; K = 0.16 at standard conditions

The complex is a much more intense emerald green colour than the Ni(H_{2}O)_{6}^{2+} ion. Brooker claims that intense light photocatalyses the destruction of the ionic nitro complexes, leaving only Ni(NO_{2})_{2}(H_{2}O)_{4}.

Nickel nitrite slowly decomposes slightly in aqueous solution due to disproportionation:

3 NO_{2}^{−} + 2 H^{+} → 2 NO(g) + NO_{3}^{–} + H_{2}O

== Complexes ==
In the presence of additional ligands, nickel nitrite can change colors substantially. These color changes may arise from the new molecular orbitals, or linkage isomerism, in which the nitro ligands rearrange to a nitrito (-ONO) complex. Sorted by color, known compounds include:

Violet
- Ni((Me_{2}N)Pyr)_{2}(ONO)_{2}
Reddish blue-violet
- Ni((MeNH)Pyr)_{2}(NO_{2})_{2}
Blue-gray
- Ni(C(MeNH)H(CH_{2})_{3}(CMeH)NH)_{2}(ONO)_{2}
Blue
- Ni(Pyr)_{4}(ONO)_{2}
- Ni(N,N-Et_{2}en)_{2}(NO_{2})_{2}
- Ni(C(Me_{2}N)H(CH_{2})_{4}NH)_{2}(ONO)_{2}
- Ni((MeNH)(Me)Pyr)_{2}(ONO)_{2}
Blue-green
- Ni(R_{n}en)_{2}(ONO)_{2}
- Ni(N,N'-Et_{2}en)_{2}(NO_{2})_{2}
Green
- Ni(α-MePyr)_{2}(NO_{2})_{2}
- Ni(C_{9}H_{7}N)_{2}(NO_{2})_{2}
Red
- Ni(NO_{2})_{2}(NH_{3})_{4}
- Ni(en)_{2}(NO_{2})_{2}
- Ni(R-en)_{2}(NO_{2})_{2}
- Ni((NH_{2}CH_{2})(NH_{2})iPr)_{2}(NO_{2})_{2}
- Ni(Et-en)_{2}(NO_{2})_{2}
- Ni(rac-Ph_{2}en)_{2}(NO_{2})_{2}
- Ni(C(MeNH)H(CH_{2})_{4}NH)_{2}(NO_{2})_{2}
- Ni(N,N'-Me_{2}en)_{2}(NO_{2})_{2}•H_{2}O
- Ni(N,N-Me_{2}en)_{2}(NO_{2})_{2}
Pink
- Ni(Me-en)_{2}(NO_{2})_{2}

== Double salts ==
The nitronickelates are related compounds where more nitro groups are attached to nickel to yield an anion. They could be described as nickel double nitrites.
