= The Armoloy Corporation =

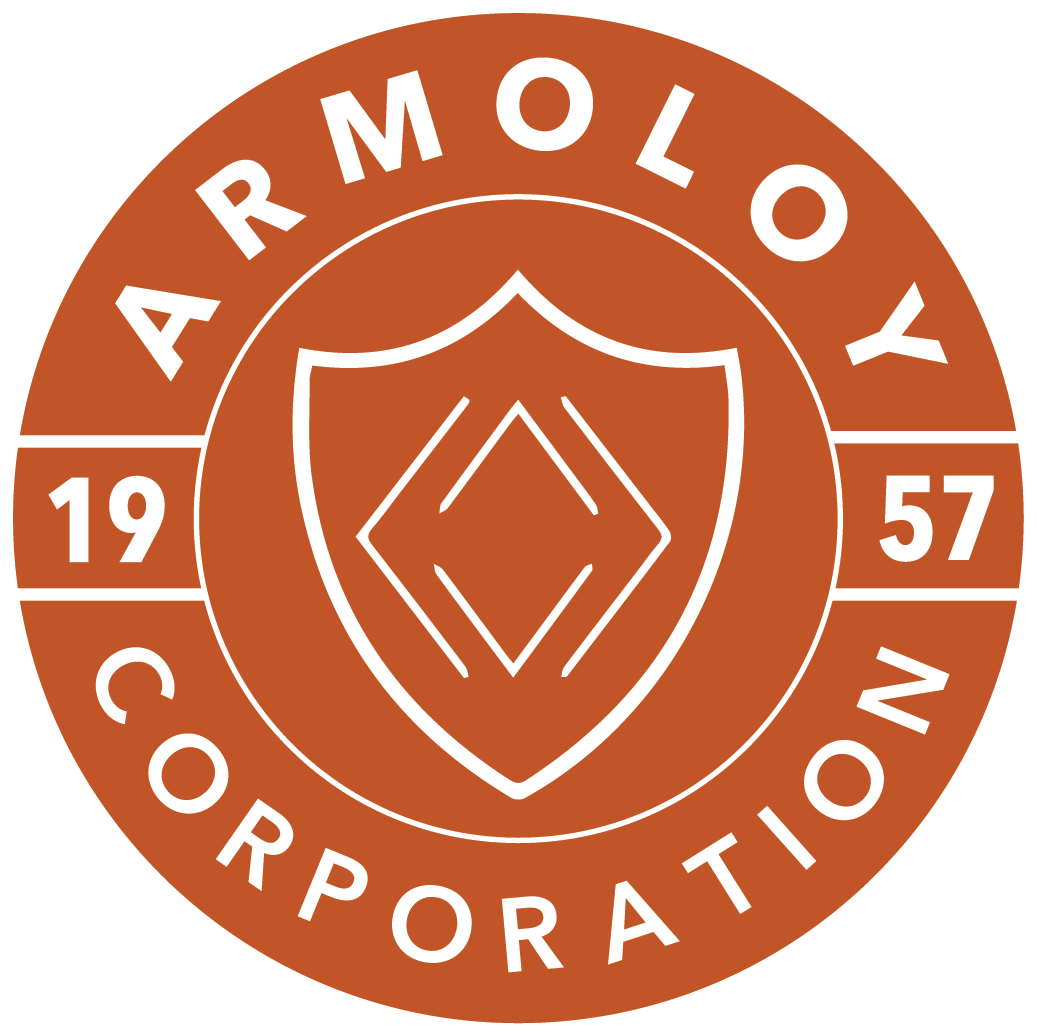
- Logo of Armoloy
- Formation: 1957; 64 years ago
- Type: Private
- Headquarters: DeKalb, Illinois, United States
- Products: Armoloy TDC, Armoloy XADC, Bi-Protec, Armoloy Nyflon, Electroless Nickel
- Services: Industrial surface plating
- Key people: Nolan Hannan (Owner, COO), Jake Meier (Owner, CBDO)
- Parent organization: The Armoloy Corporation
- Website: https://www.armoloy.com

The Armoloy Corporation, typically referred to as Armoloy, is an American multinational service provider of industrial surface plating and coating processes. Based in DeKalb, Illinois, United States, Armoloy designs and develops surface coatings for functional improvements of metal components used in manufacturing processes.

Armoloy was founded in 1957 by Jerome F. Bejbl and Larry F. Jarres. The privately held company is owned and operated by Nolan Hannan and Jacob Meier. Armoloy serves industries that include aerospace, food packaging, petroleum, healthcare, nuclear, injection molding, and automation.

Armoloy has 18 franchise locations in seven countries. The company's mission is to enhance the longevity of metal objects through surface optimization and improved wear resistance. Armoloy's TDC (thin dense chrome) and XADC (diamond chrome) reduce abrasion, erosion, friction, and contact fatigue, increasing resistance to corrosion and oxidation, and improving insulation and conductivity.
