= Max Schlötter =

German electrochemist, pioneer of plating technology

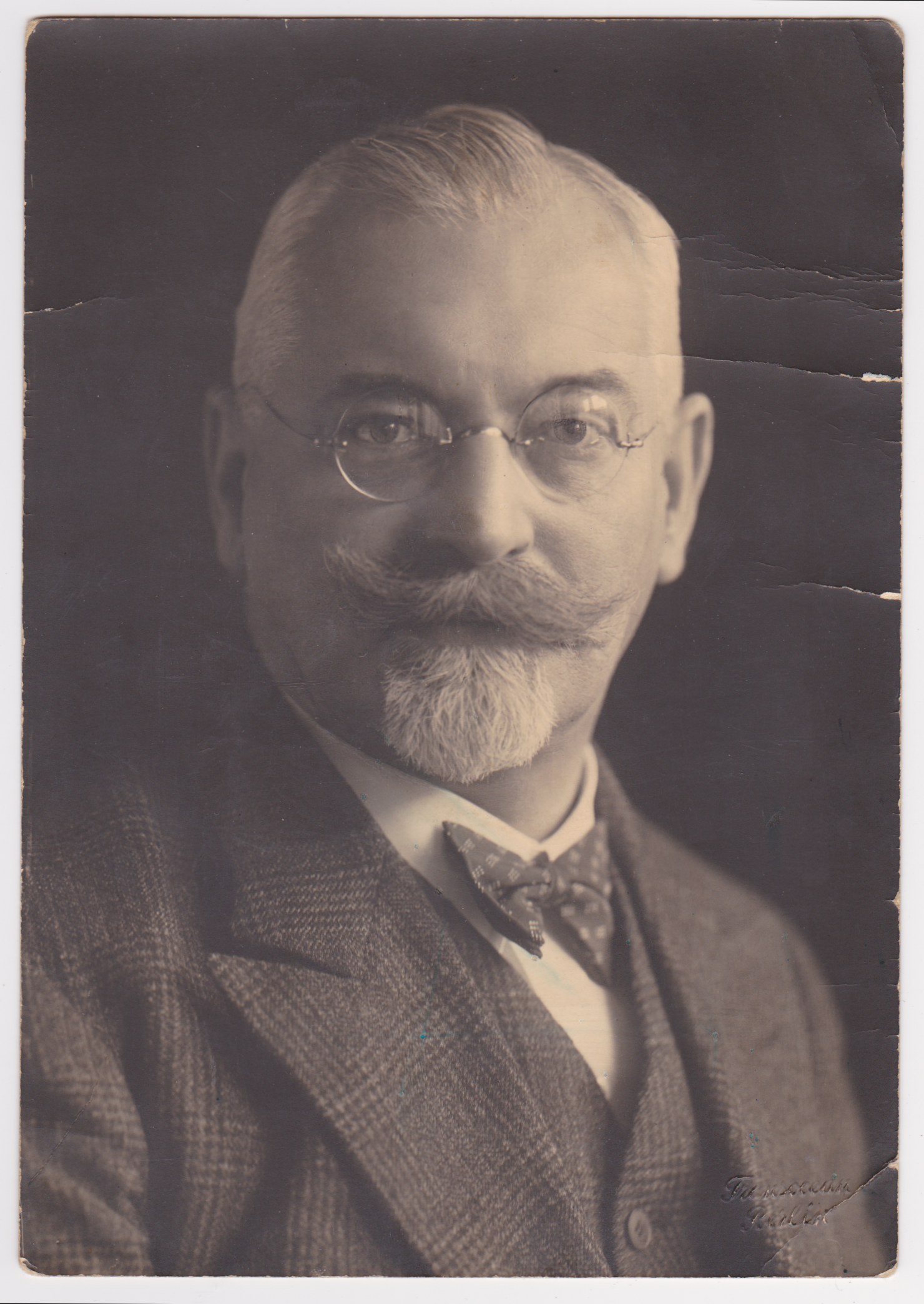
Max Schlötter (1878-1946)

Max Schlötter (23 October 1878 – 22 May 1946) was a German electrochemist, pioneer of electroplating technology and entrepreneur.

== Early career ==
Max Schlötter studied chemistry at the Technical University of Munich from the winter semester of 1897/98 onwards, under Wilhelm von Miller, Andreas Lipp and Wilhelm Muthmann. He obtained his doctorate there in December 1902, having written a dissertation entitled 'Electrolytic oxidation of fatty acids' (Über die elektrolytische Oxidation von Fettreihen).

In 1901, he joined Deutsche Solvay AG in Bernburg as a chemist. There, he managed the analytical laboratory of the potash works and conducted research on Castner-Kellner alkali electrolysis. In June 1906, he moved to Langbein & Co. in Leipzig, which merged with Wilh. Pfanhauser of Vienna to form Langbein-Pfanhauser Werke AG. Schlötter worked as a laboratory manager there, working on the electrolytic deposition of metals, especially tin, lead and iron, as well as the production of metal salts and the manufacture of electroplating products.

== Company launch ==
In July 1912, he set up his own business, founding an 'Electrochemical Research Laboratory' in Leipzig, which developed into Dr.-Ing. Max Schlötter GmbH & Co. KG, one of Germany's leading specialist companies for electroplating technology. After a brief stay in Cologne, he relocated the company to Berlin in 1915, presumably because he had begun working for the War Raw Materials Department (Kriegsrohstoffabteilung, or KRA) in late 1914. This department had been established by Walther Rathenau in August 1914. The KRA promoted the development of substitute materials and production processes that replaced scarce raw materials. The authorities regulated the use of scarce metals such as copper, nickel and brass. For example, Max Schlötter succeeded in further developing electrolytic processes for iron separation, enabling the copper galvanos at the Reich Printing Office (Reichsdruckerei) to be converted to iron electroplating. From 1929 to 1945, Schlötter was an honorary professor of electrochemistry at the Technical University of Berlin.

== Electroplating developments ==
Schlötter is one of the pioneers of bright, high-performance electroplating baths. From the mid-1920s onwards, he worked intensively on developing bright deposits, particularly for tin, nickel and silver. These bright baths were based on conventional electroplating baths. In 1932, Max Schlötter filed a patent in the USA for bright nickel deposition ('Formation of dense, highly lustrous and impervious nickel deposits', US Patent 1972693). In 1930, he discovered that using organic aromatic polysulfonates produced a dramatically improved finish: a hard, smooth, mirror-like surface on what was formerly a semi-bright nickel-plated deposit. In 1934, Schlötter sold the rights to his process to the US-based Pyrene Manufacturing Co., which marketed the first practical bright nickel process as Pyrene High Gloss Nickel. Schlötter's timing was immaculate since the fast developing USA automotive industry quickly took full advantage of nickel with the manufacture of new cars.

In 1934, Schlötter achieved a breakthrough in bright tin plating. He patented a 'process for the electrolytic deposition of shiny tin precipitates' (DRP 746134[SG1] ). His tin electrolyte was based on phenolsulphonic acid and various organic additives, which were combined with each other: colloids such as glue, gelatine and agar-agar on the one hand, and colloids such as resins, bitumen, cellulose derivatives, sulphurised oils and wood tar on the other. Compared to hot-dip tinning, electrolytic tin deposition allows significantly thinner tin layers to be deposited. Schlötter's tin electrolyte was used in a strip tinning plant at Remy van der Zypen (now ThyssenKrupp) in Andernach from 1934 and in Gary in the USA from 1937 for tinplate production and contributed significantly to the establishment of tinplate as a modern packaging material.

In total, Max Schlötter registered more than 60 national and international patents during his professional career and published numerous articles on electroplating technology in technical journals.

In March 1939, Max Schlötter bought a commercial building at Rigaer Straße 71–73a in Berlin-Friedrichshain from the Beiser brothers for 160,000 Reichsmarks. Part of the premises were leased to Osram GmbH. As the Beiser brothers were Jewish, the sale was deemed forced in 1947 under Law No. 52 of the Allied Control Council ('Blocking and Control of Property'), as Jewish property owners were compelled to sell their assets under the 'Decree on the Use of Jewish Property' (Verordnung über den Einsatz jüdischen Vermögens) of 3 December 1938. In 1999, the property was returned to the descendants of Simon and Michael (Mechel) Beiser.

== Final years ==
Max Schlötter moved to Geislingen an der Steige in 1944 and died in Schwäbisch Hall in 1946 following a long illness.

The company he founded in 1912 remains privately owned by the fourth generation of Schlötter's family, and celebrated its centenary in 2012. It employs around 300 people, 180 in the head office in Geislingen.

== Publications ==
- Schlötter, Max: Über die elektrolytische Gewinnung von Brom und Jod, Verlag Wilhelm Knapp, Halle 1907
- Schlötter, Max: Galvanostegie. 1. Teil. Über elektrolytische Metallniederschläge. Monographie über angewandte Elektrochemie, Band 37, Verlag Wilhelm Knapp, Halle 1910
- Schlötter, Max: Galvanostegie 2. Teil. Über besondere Einrichtungen zum Plattieren, Verlag Wilhelm Knapp, Halle 1911
- Schlötter, Max und Lipp, C.: Galvanoplastik. Deutscher Buchdrucker-Verein, Berlin 1928
