= Isaac Adams Jr. =

American inventor (1836–1911)

Dr. Isaac Adams Jr.
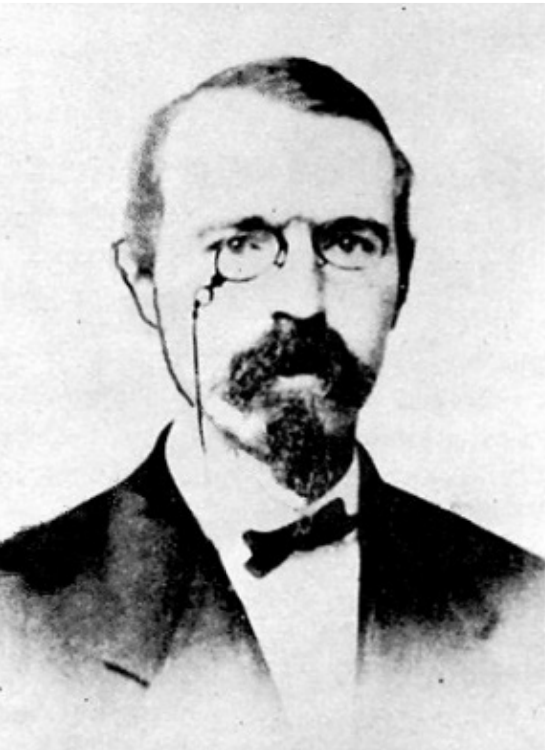
- Isaac Adams Jr. in 1869
- Born: February 20, 1836; Boston, Massachusetts, U.S.
- Died: July 24, 1911 (aged 75); Annisquam, Massachusetts, U.S.
- Occupation: Inventor
- Known for: Nickel electroplating
- Spouse: Lucille

Isaac Adams Jr. (February 20, 1836 – July 24, 1911) was an American inventor and businessman, primarily notable for the invention of the first commercially viable nickel plating process.

== Biography ==
Isaac Adams Jr. was born on February 20, 1836, into a newly wealthy Boston family. His father, also Isaac Adams, a successful inventor, businessman, and politician, by the time of Isaac Jr.'s birth had already invented the first commercially successful power printing press. Isaac Jr. spent his childhood mostly at the boarding schools after an untimely death of his mother.

Always a good student, per his father's insistence (Adams Sr. had no formal education, and needed a well-established son to operate easily in the upper society), Adams pursued the medical career, graduating from Bowdoin College and Harvard Medical School, getting his MD degree in 1862. Adams then moved on to the Êcole de Médicine in Paris, where he spent time mostly on chemistry, but also on glass blowing and medical studies. In particular, he learned from a French instrument maker, Adoplhe Gaiffe (1832–1887), skills to make Geissler tubes. He also reportedly visited Germany to study under Robert Bunsen. Upon return to Boston in the fall of 1864, Adams tried to become a practicing doctor, and failed, instead setting up a laboratory in South Boston, where from 1865 to 1868 he successfully manufactured Geissler tubes. Adams also experimented with "carbon burner" filament incandescent lamps ten years prior to Edison's inventions (first operational device was produced in 1865), eventually abandoning the electric lighting business due to the perceived impossibility of generating electricity at a reasonable cost.

In the late 1864 Adams became engaged to his cousin, Elizabeth Agry Adams, despite fierce objections of her guardian (and business partner of Adams' father), Seth Adams, who thought that Adams "is in no business that he manages in such a way that gives any evidence that he is likely to" be able to support the family. Elizabeth died in 1865, this might have prompted Adams to quit medicine.

Never completely stopping his work with nickel deposition, Adams became a recognized expert and filed multiple patents. An impulse was provided in the end of 1865 with the request by a Boston gas lighting manufacturer to produce an improved gas tip. 1500 tips were successfully manufactured using the nickel-plated iron, and Adams filed for a patent on the plating process on July 16, 1866. He was one of the founders of the United Nickel Company, formed on June 14, 1869, and served there as president, chemist and patent advisor until the dissolution of the business in 1890. The purpose of the company was to exploit Adams' patents; the founders made fortunes by licensing the patents to over 1000 businesses.

Another company, New York Nickel Plating Company, was established in New York City in July 1869. In October of the same year, Adams went to Europe with one of his investors, E. A. Quintard, with the goal to establish the plating industry there; a shop was immediately set up in Liverpool, another one in Paris in December 1869, a large plant in Birmingham by the spring of 1870. At first, the European plants faced essentially no competition.

At the same time, Adams married Lucille Bell (or Lucille Lods), in December 1869. The bride was related to Adams' now-partner Adolphe Gaiffe. In 1870, Franco-Prussian War broke out, forcing Adams to return to the US, where the Adams family had two sons (at the time of marriage, Lucille already had two young daughters), Walter Owen in 1876 and Isaac Rayne in 1880, Rayne eventually became an architect. Adams family had a house at 11 Shepard Street in Cambridge, Massachusetts, close to the Harvard University and built a summer house in the Annisquam section of Gloucester, Massachusetts.

Multiple patents by Adams allowed the United Nickel Company in these "robber baron" times to successfully defend its market position through lawsuits, hundreds of them. The outcome of lawsuits to some extent was based on the fact that nobody was able to manufacture nickel plating before Adams' research, so the patents must have been valuable, and even token use of ingredients from the patents was considered an infringement.

Adams retired after the lawsuits were wound down and the United Nickel Company was disbanded in 1890. He lived a private life, so very few obituaries were published when he died at his summer residence in Annisquam. The official cause of death was "valvular heart disease", but Adams' son, Rayne, stated that his father "died mainly because he did not want to live, he [just] let go", being devastated by the death of his wife Lucille in 1908, difficulty breathing and a grave fall in April 1911.

== Nickel plating research ==
At Harvard, Adams studied under professor of mineralogy and chemistry Josiah Parsons Cooke, investigating the electrolysis of nickel and cobalt salts. There, in 1958–1959, Adams developed electroplating process and successfully deposited 3 to 5 mils of nickel onto 3x4 inch substrates. The research did not end in a commercial development, but Cooke kept the laboratory books and samples that were used by Adams later.

At the end of 1865, Adams, at the request of a gas-fixture dealer, Joseph Smith, tried to manufacture a substitute for the lava gas burner tip. Adams attempted make the nozzle out of nickel-coated iron, originally failed to repeat his work done in Harvard, yet persisted, obtained a patent in 1866, and manufactured many iron tips, but that business failed to catch up due to lower cost of the lava ones.

By 1869 Adams became an expert on nickel deposition, producing few patents, including the main one, filed on July 9, 1869, describing the use of sulfate baths for the plating.

== Works ==
- Adams, Isaac (1906). "The Development of the Nickel-Plating Industry". Trans. Amer. Electrochem. Soc. 9: 211.
- I. Adams Jr., "Improvement in Coating Metals With Metal," U.S. patent 57,271, August 21, 1866
- I. Adams Jr., "Improved Mode of Electroplating With Nickel," U.S. patent 90,332, May 25, 1869; filled May 6, 1869
- I. Adams Jr., "Improved Mode of Melting, Casting and Hardening Nickel," U.S. patent 90,476, May 25, 1869; filled May 6, 1869.
- I. Adams Jr., "Improvement in the Electrodeposition of Nickel," U.S. Patent 93,157, August 3, 1869; filed July 9, 1869
- I. Adams Jr., "Improvement in the Manufacture of the Metallic Parts of Fire-Arms," U.S. patent 98,006, December 21, 1869; filed November 5, 1869
- I. Adams Jr., "Improvement in the Electrodeposition of Metals," U.S. patent 100,961, March 22, 1870; filed February 28, 1870.
- I. Adams Jr., "Improvement in the Electrodeposition of Nickel," U.S. patent 109,748, May 10, 1870; filed April 19, 1870
- I. Adams Jr., "Improvement in Electroplating with Nickel," U.S. patent 113,612, April 11, 1871; filed December 19, 1870
- I. Adams Jr., "Improvement in Nickel Plating," U.S. patent 116,658, July 4, 1871; filed October 8, 1870
- I. Adams Jr., "Improvement in Nickel Plating," U.S. patent 136,634, March 11, 1873; filed January 17, 1873
- I. Adams Jr., "Improvement in Nickel Plating," U.S. patent 154,435, August 25, 1874; filed October 21, 1872
- I. Adams Jr., "Improvement in Cobalt Electroplating," U.S. patent 172,862, February 1, 1876; filed January 17, 1876
- I. Adams Jr., "Improvement in Coating Metallic Articles with Vulcanizable Rubber," U.S. patent 215,034, May 6, 1879; filed September 5, 1878
- I. Adams Jr., "Incandescent Electric Lamp," U.S. patent 282,030, July 31, 1883; filed April 4, 1882

== Addresses ==
- Medical practice: 763 Federal Street, Boston, MA.
- Boston Nickel Plating Company: 14 Province Street, Boston, MA, in 1876 moved to 160 Portland Street.

== Sources ==
- Dubpernell, George (1959). "The story of nickel plating" [reprinted in Plating & Surface Finishing, April 2006, pp. 34-43] (PDF). Plating. 46 (6): 599–616.
- Marolda, Anthony J. (2022). "Doctor Isaac Adams, Distinguished Inventor" (PDF). gloucesterma400.org. 400 Stories Project.
- Marolda, Anthony J. (2007). The Inventor and The Inventor's Son. Procyon Press. ISBN 9780979309908.
- Sellers, W. Wallace (1984). "A Retrospective View of Nickel Plating" (PDF). Plating & Surface Finishing. 71 (6): 64–70.
- Nebiolo, William P. (August 2022). "The History of Electroplating And A Historical Review of the Evolution of NASF" (PDF). NASF Surface Technology White Papers. 86 (11). NASF: 1–14.
- Mantell, Charles Letnam (1933). Sparks from the Electrode. Williams & Wilkins. OCLC 16148107.
- DiBari, George A. (April 2002). "Chronology of nickel electroplating". Metal Finishing. 100 (4): 34–49. doi:10.1016/S0026-0576(02)80244-6. ISSN 0026-0576.
- Lowenheim, Frederick A. (1952). "The Electrodeposition Division". Journal of the Electrochemical Society. 99 (2): 34C. doi:10.1149/1.2779661. ISSN 0013-4651. S2CID 95229136.
