= Periodatonickelates =

The periodatonickelates are a series of anions and salts of nickel complexed to the periodate anion. The most important of these salts are the diperiodatonickelates, in which nickel exhibits the +4 oxidation state: these are powerful oxidising agents, capable of oxidising bromate to perbromate.

The first periodatonickalates discovered were sodium nickel periodate (NaNiIO_{6}·0.5H_{2}O) and potassium nickel periodate (KNiIO_{6}·0.5H_{2}O). P. Ray and B. Sarma obtained these dark purple double salts in 1949, mixing nickel sulfate with potassium or sodium periodate and (as oxidant) a boiling aqueous solution of an alkali persulfate salt. It is now known that ozone can replace the persulfate salt, and that similar solids exist for other alkali (RbNiIO_{6}·0.5H_{2}O, CsNiIO_{6}·0.5H_{2}O, and NH_{4}NiIO_{6}·0.5H_{2}O), as well as certain other tetravalent metals (including manganese, germanium, tin and lead).

The crystalline salts are insoluble in water, acid, or base. The colour is due to absorbance of visible light shorter than 800 nm, with a peak at 540 nm. The crystal structure of each has space group P312. The structure is built from hexagonal oxygen layers; in every other layer, alkali atoms fill one-third of the hexagon centers and iodine and nickel fill the remainder; in the other layers, the centers are vacant.

The diperiodatonickelates, also known as dihydroxydiperiodatonickelates, contain nickel in the +4 oxidation state along with two periodate anions. A solid monoperiodatonickelate salt KNiIO_{6}·0.5H_{2}O will dissolve in a solution of potassium hydroxide and potassium periodate to yield a diperiodatonickelate solution.

The [Ni(OH)_{2}[IO_{5}OH]_{2}]^{6−} ion can form a brown salt with sodium (Na_{4}H_{2}[Ni(OH)_{2}[IO_{5}OH]_{2}]·6H_{2}O), another acidic sodium salt (Na_{5}[Ni(OH)_{2}[IO_{5}OH]_{2}]·H_{2}O) and an orange salt with cobalt ([Co(en)_{3}]_{2}Ni(OH)_{2}[IO_{5}OH]_{2}). Diperiodatometalates with the same formula also exist for palladium and nickel, and similar diperiodatometalates can be made for Cu, Ag, Au, Ru and Os.

A diperiodatonickelate will dissolve in alkaline water. Depending on pH and concentration, the resulting solution is an equilibrium between [Ni(OH)_{2}[IO_{3}(OH)_{3}]_{2}]^{2−} and [Ni(OH)_{2}[IO_{3}(OH)_{3}][IO_{4}(OH)_{2}]]^{3−}. It is also a strong oxidiser: like very few reagents, it oxidises bromate to perbromate. In the reaction, Ni^{IV} reduces to Ni^{III} with the release of a hydroxyl radical. The radical then oxidises bromate to a BrO_{4}^{2−} radical, which Ni^{III} then converts to perbromate BrO_{4}^{−}.
