= Nitronickelate =

The nitronickelates are a class of chemical compounds containing a nickel atom complexed by nitro groups, –NO_{2}. Nickel can be in a +2 or +3 oxidation state. There can be five (pentanitronickelates), or six, (hexanitronickelates) nitro groups per nickel atom. They can be considered the double nitrites of nickel nitrite.

formula	name	structure	Remarks	references
Rb_{3}[Ni(NO_{2})_{5}]	trirubidium pentanitronickelate(II)			
Cs_{3}[Ni(NO_{2})_{5}]	tricaesium pentanitronickelate(II)		dark red, formed from caesium nitrite and nickel nitrite in water	
K_{3}[Ni(NO_{2})_{5}]·KNO_{2}	potassium pentanitronickelate potassium nitrite	monoclinic, a = 7.240 Å, b = 10.946 Å, c = 7.120 Å, β = 98.086°; Z = 2; 4 nitro groups bonded to Ni by N, 1 by O (–ONO)	formed by heating monohydrate at 100 °C dark purple; hygroscopic	
K_{4}[Ni(NO_{2})_{6}]·H_{2}O	potassium hexanitronickelate monohydrate	hexagonal, a = 7.634 Å, c = 22.45 Å, Z = 3; nitro groups bonded to Ni via N; water not coordinated	formed from KNO_{2} and NiCl_{2} mix in water; orange brown; stable in vacuum	
K_{2}Ca[Ni(NO_{2})_{6}]	potassium calcium hexanitronickelate	cubic, a = 10.31 Å, Z = 4	buff	
K_{2}Sr[Ni(NO_{2})_{6}]	potassium strontium hexanitronickelate	cubic, a = 10.5063 Å, Z = 4, density = 2.867 g/cm^{3}	brown yellow	
K_{2}Ba[Ni(NO_{2})_{6}]	potassium barium hexanitronickelate	cubic Fm3 (and m3m), a = 10.7800 Å, Z = 4, density = 2.918 g/cm^{3}	brown yellow	
K_{2}Pb[Ni(NO_{2})_{6}]	potassium lead hexanitronickelate	cubic Fm3, a = 10.577 Å, Z = 4, density = 3.480 g/cm^{3}: No NO_{2} group disorder	buff colour	
N(CH_{3})_{4}[Ni(NO_{2})_{3}]	tetramethylammonium nickel nitrite TMNIN	hexagonal perovskite P3̅m1, a = 9.103 Å, c = 7.082 Å, V = 508.2 Å^{3}, Z = 2, density = 1.770 g/cm^{3}; all nitros are bidentate, nickel either links to N or O of the NO_{2}, forming a chain of nickel alternating with ONO	yellow brown; one-dimensional Heisenberg antiferromagnet; Haldane material; phase transitions at 409.1 and 428.4 K due to rotation of N(CH_{3})_{4}	
