= Plášilite =

Very rare uranium mineral

General
- Category: Sulfate mineral
- Formula: Na(UO_{2})(SO_{4})(OH)•2H_{2}O
- IMA symbol: Pšl
- Crystal system: Monoclinic
- Crystal class: Prismatic (2/m) (same H-M symbol)
- Space group: P2_{1}/c
- Unit cell: a = 8.71, b = 13.84, c = 7.05 [Å], β = 112.13° (approximated)

Identification
- Color: Greenish yellow
- Crystal habit: prismatic
- Cleavage: {010} and {001}, perfect
- Tenacity: Brittle
- Mohs scale hardness: 2-3
- Luster: Vitreous
- Streak: White
- Diaphaneity: Transparent
- Density: 3.73 (calculated) (approximated)
- Optical properties: Biaxal (+)
- Refractive index: nα=1.56, nβ=1.58, nγ=1.61 (approximated)
- Pleochroism: ~Colourless (X), very pale yellow (Y), pale yellow (Z)
- 2V angle: 88^{o} (measured)
- Ultraviolet fluorescence: Bluish-white
- Other characteristics: Radioactive

Plášilite is a very rare uranium mineral with the formula Na_{2}(UO_{2})(SO_{4})_{2}•3H_{2}O. Chemically related minerals include natrozippeite, belakovskiite, meisserite, fermiite and oppenheimerite. Most of these uranyl sulfate minerals were originally found in the Blue Lizard mine, San Juan County, Utah, US. The mineral is named after Czech crystallographer Jakub Plášil.

== Association and origin ==
Plášilite is associated with other sulfate minerals: natrozippeite, johannite, blödite, brochantite, chalcanthite, gypsum, hexahydrite, manganoblödite, and tamarugite. Non-sulfate coexisting minerals include atacamite, calcite, dickite and gerhardtite. Plášilite is secondary in origin, being the product of weathering of the primary uranium mineral, uraninite.

== Crystal structure ==
The crystal structure of plášilite is of a new type. Its building blocks are:

- (UO_{2})_{2}(SO_{4})_{2}(OH)_{2} sheets, with a charge 2-, parallel to (010), of a phosphuranylite topology
- edge-sharing NaO_{2}(H_{2}O)_{4} polyhedra, parallel to [001]

The sodium-bearing polyhedra link the uranyl-sulfate sheets. It terms of sheet geometry, crystal structure of plášilite is similar to that of deliensite.
