= Fermiite =

Rare uranium mineral

General
- Category: Sulfate mineral
- Formula: Na_{4}(UO_{2})(SO_{4})_{3}·3H_{2}O
- IMA symbol: Fmi
- Crystal system: Orthorhombic
- Crystal class: Pyramidal (mm2); H-M symbol: (mm2)
- Space group: Pmn2_{1}
- Unit cell: a = 11.84, b = 7.87 c = 15.33 [Å] (approximated); Z = 4

Identification
- Color: Pale greenish-yellow
- Crystal habit: prismatic
- Cleavage: None
- Tenacity: Brittle
- Mohs scale hardness: 2.5
- Streak: White
- Diaphaneity: Transparent
- Density: 3.31 (calculated); 3.23 (measured)
- Optical properties: Biaxal (+)
- Refractive index: nα=1.52, nβ=1.53, nγ=1.57 (approximated)
- Pleochroism: Colourless (X & Y), pale greenish-yellow (Z)
- 2V angle: 50^{o} (calculated)
- Other characteristics: Radioactive

Fermiite is a rare uranium mineral with the formula Na_{4}(UO_{2})(SO_{4})_{3}·3H_{2}O. Chemically related minerals include oppenheimerite, meisserite (which is also structurally-related to fermiite), belakovskiite, natrozippeite and plášilite. Fermiite comes from the Blue Lizard mine, San Juan County, Utah, USA, which is known for many rare uranium minerals. The name honors Enrico Fermi (1901–1954).

== Association ==
Fermiite is closely associated with numerous other sulfate minerals: oppenheimerite, bluelizardite, wetherillite, blödite, manganoblödite, chalcanthite, epsomite, gypsum, hexahydrite, kröhnkite, sideronatrite and tamarugite.

== Crystal structure ==
The main building block of the crystal structure of fermiite is a chain of the composition (UO_{2})(SO_{4})_{3}. Chains are connected with five types of Na-O polyhedra.
