= Oppenheimerite =

Very rare uranium mineral

General
- Category: Sulfate mineral
- Formula: Na_{2}(UO_{2})(SO_{4})_{2}•3H_{2}O
- IMA symbol: Ohm
- Crystal system: Triclinic
- Crystal class: Pinacoidal (1̅) (same H-M symbol)
- Space group: P1̅
- Unit cell: a = 7.96, b = 8.20, c = 9.81 [Å]; α = 65.97° β = 70.28°, γ = 91.46° (approximated), Z = 2

Identification
- Color: Pale greenish-yellow
- Crystal habit: prismatic
- Cleavage: {11̅0}, {011} and {101}, good
- Fracture: Irregular
- Mohs scale hardness: 2.5
- Luster: Vitreous
- Streak: White
- Diaphaneity: Transparent
- Density: 3.36 (calculated) (approximated)
- Optical properties: Biaxal (+)
- Refractive index: nα=1.54, nβ=1.63, nγ=1.59 (approximated)
- Pleochroism: Very pale greenish-yellow (X), pale greenish-yellow (Y), greenish-yellow (Z)
- 2V angle: 72^{o} (measured)
- Ultraviolet fluorescence: Greenish-white
- Other characteristics: Radioactive

Oppenheimerite is a very rare uranium mineral with the formula Na_{2}(UO_{2})(SO_{4})_{2}•3H_{2}O. Chemically related minerals include fermiite, natrozippeite, plášilite, belakovskiite and meisserite. Most of these uranyl sulfate minerals were originally found in the Blue Lizard mine, San Juan County, Utah, US. The mineral is named after American Theoretical physicist J. Robert Oppenheimer.

== Association and origin ==
Oppenheimerite is associated with other sulfate minerals: fermiite, bluelizardite, wetherillite, blödite, chalcanthite, epsomite, gypsum, hexahydrite, kröhnkite, manganoblödite, sideronatrite, and tamarugite.

== Crystal structure ==
The crystal structure of oppenheimerite is of a new type. It contains chains of the (UO_{2})(SO_{4})_{2}(H_{2}O) composition, connected with two types of sodium polyhedra.
