= Blodite group =

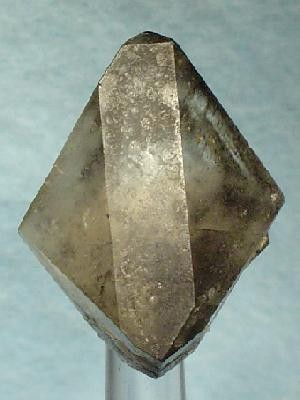
Blodite crystal

The blodite group (or Blödite group) is a group of minerals with two (in most cases divalent) cations and two anions. The group includes blödite Na_{2}Mg(SO_{4})_{2}•4H_{2}O, leonite K_{2}Mg(SO_{4})_{2}•4(H_{2}O), anapaite Ca_{2}Fe(PO_{4})_{2}•4(H_{2}O), schertelite (NH_{4})_{2}Mg(PO_{3}OH)_{2}•4(H_{2}O,) manganoblödite Na_{2}Mn(SO_{4})_{2}•4(H_{2}O), cobaltoblödite Na_{2}Co(SO_{4}) _{2}•4(H_{2}O), changoiteNa_{2}Zn(SO_{4})_{2}•4(H_{2}O)
