= Belakovskiite =

Very rare uranium mineral

General
- Category: Sulfate mineral
- Formula: Na_{7}(UO_{2})(SO_{4})_{4}(SO_{3}OH)(H_{2}O)_{3}
- IMA symbol: Bkk
- Crystal system: Triclinic
- Crystal class: Pinacoidal (1̅) (same H-M symbol)
- Space group: P1̅
- Unit cell: a = 5.46, b = 11.33, c = 18.42 [Å], α = 104.77°, β = 90.09°, γ = 96.77° (approximated); Z = 2

Identification
- Color: Yellow-green
- Crystal habit: fibrous
- Cleavage: None
- Tenacity: Brittle
- Mohs scale hardness: 2
- Luster: Vitreous
- Streak: White
- Diaphaneity: Transparent
- Density: 3.31 (calculated); 3.23 (measured)
- Optical properties: Biaxal (+)
- Refractive index: nα=1.50, nβ=1.51, nγ=1.52 (approximated)
- Pleochroism: None
- 2V angle: 88^{o} (calculated)
- Other characteristics: Radioactive

Belakovskiite is a very rare uranium mineral with the formula Na_{7}(UO_{2})(SO_{4})_{4}(SO_{3}OH)(H_{2}O)_{3}. It is interesting in being a natural uranyl salt with hydrosulfate anion, a feature shared with meisserite. Other chemically related minerals include fermiite, oppenheimerite, natrozippeite and plášilite. Most of these uranyl sulfate minerals was originally found in the Blue Lizard mine, San Juan County, Utah, US. The mineral is named after Russian mineralogist Dmitry Ilych Belakovskiy.

== Association ==
Belakovskiite is associated with other sulfate minerals: meisserite, blödite, ferrinatrite, kröhnkite, and metavoltine. This association is found as efflorescences on a sandstone associated with uranium mineralization.

== Crystal structure ==
The framework of belakovskiite crystal structure is a hexavalent cluster with composition (UO_{2})(SO_{4})_{4}(H_{2}O). Such clusters are connected via Na-O and hydrogen bonds.
