= Cobaltoblödite =

Rare cobalt mineral

General
- Category: Sulfate mineral
- Formula: Na_{2}Co(SO_{4})_{2}·4H_{2}O
- IMA symbol: Cblö
- Crystal system: Monoclinic
- Crystal class: Prismatic (2/m) (same H-M symbol)
- Space group: P2_{1}/a
- Unit cell: a = 11.15, b = 8.27, c = 5.54 [Å], β=100.52° (approximated); Z = 2

Identification
- Color: Colorless (grains), reddish-pink (aggregates)
- Crystal habit: Anhedral grains, in aggregates, forming crusts
- Cleavage: None
- Fracture: Uneven
- Mohs scale hardness: 2.5
- Luster: Vitreous
- Streak: White
- Diaphaneity: Transparent
- Specific gravity: 2.29 (measured), 2.35 (calculated) (approximated)
- Optical properties: Biaxal (-)
- Refractive index: nα=1.50, nβ=1.50, nγ=1.51 (approximated)

Cobaltoblödite is a rare cobalt mineral with the formula Na_{2}Co(SO_{4})_{2}·4H_{2}O. Cobaltoblödite was found in the Blue Lizard mine, San Juan County, Utah, USA, which is known for secondary uranium minerals. Cobaltoblödite occurs intimately intergrown with manganese-, cobalt- and nickel-enriched blödite and a yet another new mineral - manganoblödite. Cobaltoblödite, as suggested by its name is a cobalt-analogue of blödite. It is also analogous to changoite, manganoblödite and nickelblödite - other members of the blödite group.

== Notes on chemistry ==
Manganoblödite is impure, containing admixtures of magnesium, manganese and nickel.

== Association and origin ==
Besite blödite and cobaltoblödite, other minerals associated with manganoblödite include chalcanthite, gypsum, johannite, sideronatrite, a feldspar group-mineral and quartz.
