= Meisserite =

Very rare uranium mineral

General
- Category: Sulfate mineral
- Formula: Na_{5}(UO_{2})(SO_{4})_{3}(SO_{3}OH)(H_{2}O)
- IMA symbol: Mss
- Crystal system: Triclinic
- Crystal class: Pinacoidal (1̅) (same H-M symbol)
- Space group: P1̅
- Unit cell: a = 5.32, b = 11.51, c = 13.56 [Å], α = 102.96°, β = 97.41°, γ = 91.46° (approximated); Z = 2

Identification
- Color: Pale green to yellowish-green
- Crystal habit: prismatic
- Cleavage: {100} and {001}, fair
- Tenacity: Very brittle
- Mohs scale hardness: 2
- Luster: Vitreous
- Streak: Very pale yellow
- Diaphaneity: Translucent to transparent
- Density: 3.21 (calculated) (approximated)
- Optical properties: Biaxal (-)
- Refractive index: nα=1.51, nβ=1.55, nγ=1.56 (approximated)
- Pleochroism: Colorless (X), pale yellow (Y), pale greenish-yellow (Z)
- 2V angle: 60^{o}
- Dispersion: Weak
- Other characteristics: Radioactive

Meisserite is a very rare uranium mineral with the formula Na_{5}(UO_{2})(SO_{4})_{3}(SO_{3}OH)(H_{2}O). It is interesting in being a natural uranyl salt with hydrosulfate (hydroxysulfate) anion, a feature shared with belakovskiite. Other chemically related minerals include fermiite, oppenheimerite, natrozippeite and plášilite. Most of these uranyl sulfate minerals was originally found in the Blue Lizard mine, San Juan County, Utah, USA. The mineral is named after Swiss mineralogist Nicolas Meisser.

== Association and origin ==
Meisserite is associated with other sulfate minerals: belakovskiite, johannite, chalcanthite, copiapite, ferrinatrite, and gypsum. It is resulting from post-mining oxidation of the primary uranium mineral - uraninite.

== Crystal structure ==
The crystal structure of meisserite is unique. The building elements include:

- pentagonal bipyramids of uranyl groups
- SO_{4} groups

These elements link to form chains. Sodium cations are bonded to oxygen atoms in chains, to hydrosulfate groups and water.
