= Silver selenate =

Names
- Other names Silver(I) selenate

Identifiers
CAS Number	7784-07-8
3D model (JSmol)	Interactive image
ChemSpider	10790114
PubChem CID	22045801
UNII	QAM8710WDB
CompTox Dashboard (EPA)	DTXSID70703778
- InChI: InChI=1S/2Ag.H2O4Se/c;;1-5(2,3)4/h;;(H2,1,2,3,4)/q2*+1;/p-2 Key: WGAKFMRZYUGMGU-UHFFFAOYSA-L
- SMILES: [O-][Se](=O)(=O)[O-].[Ag+].[Ag+]

Properties
Chemical formula	Ag_{2}SeO_{4}
Molar mass	358.70 g/mol
Appearance	Grey-white crystalline solid
Density	5.839 g/cm^{3} (25 °C)
Solubility in water	Slightly soluble in water

Structure
Crystal structure	Orthorhombic
Space group	Fddd, No. 70
Lattice constant	a = 1.0388 nm, b = 1.2981 nm, c = 0.60499 nm
Formula units (Z)	8
- Except where otherwise noted, data are given for materials in their standard state (at 25 °C [77 °F], 100 kPa). Infobox references

Silver selenate is an inorganic compound of silver and the selenate ion, with the chemical formula Ag_{2}SeO_{4}. It is a grey-white crystalline solid that is only slightly soluble in water.

== Structure and properties ==
Silver selenate crystallizes in the orthorhombic crystal system and is isostructural with silver sulfate. Its space group is Fddd (No. 70), with eight formula units per unit cell.

At 25 °C, the lattice parameters are a = 10.388 Å, b = 12.981 Å and c = 6.0499 Å. The corresponding calculated density is 5.839 g/cm^{3}.

The solubility of Ag_{2}SeO_{4} in pure water at 25 °C is of the order of 10^{−3} mol kg^{−1}. A thermodynamic review estimated a solubility range of approximately 1.2–2.4 × 10^{−3} mol kg^{−1} and a solubility product of about log K_{sp} = −8.26.

Silver selenate undergoes a reversible polymorphic transformation near 450 °C.

Modern thermal and spectroscopic studies have also characterized its decomposition behaviour, infrared spectrum and UV–visible absorption.

=== Complex formation ===
Silver selenate dissolves in concentrated aqueous ammonia by formation of the linear diamminesilver(I) ion, [Ag(NH_{3})_{2}]^{+}. The corresponding crystalline selenate complex, [Ag(NH_{3})_{2}]_{2}SeO_{4}, has been structurally characterized.

== Preparation ==
Silver selenate can be prepared by reaction of silver carbonate with selenic acid:

Ag_{2}CO_{3} + H_{2}SeO_{4} → Ag_{2}SeO_{4} + H_{2}O + CO_{2}↑

It can also be precipitated from aqueous solutions of a soluble silver salt and a soluble selenate. For example, silver nitrate and magnesium selenate have been used to prepare crystalline Ag_{2}SeO_{4}.

Ag_{2}SeO_{4} has been synthesized hydrothermally from metallic silver and 40% selenic acid at 250 °C.
