= Nickelblödite =

Rare nickel sulfate mineral

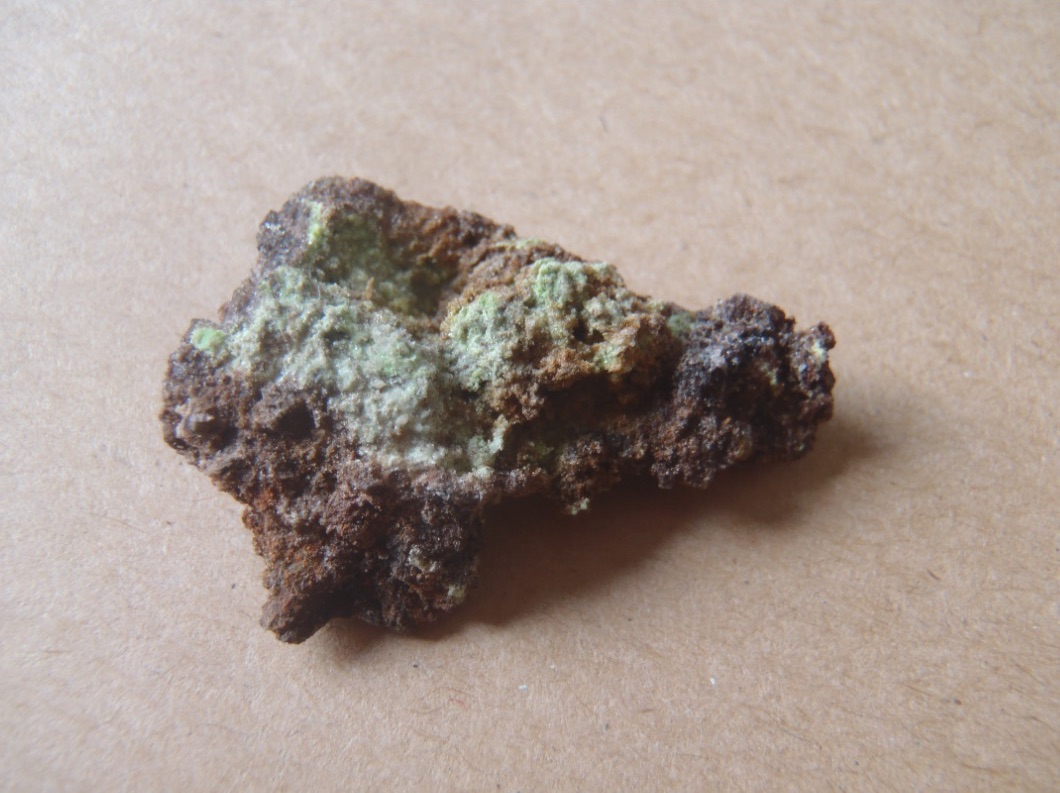
- A crust of greenish nickelblödite on gossan; obtained from dealer at the Minerant (mineral show of the MKA) 2016

General
- Category: Sulfate mineral
- Formula: Na_{2}Ni(SO_{4})_{2}·4H_{2}O
- IMA symbol: Nblö
- Strunz classification: 7.CC.50
- Dana classification: 29.3.3.2
- Crystal system: Monoclinic
- Crystal class: Prismatic (2/m) (same H-M symbol)
- Space group: P2_{1}/a
- Unit cell: a = 10.87, b = 8.07 c = 5.46 [Å]; β = 100.43°; Z = 2

Identification
- Color: Pale yellowish-green to pale green
- Crystal habit: Flat crystallites
- Diaphaneity: Translucent
- Specific gravity: 2.43 (calculated)
- Optical properties: Biaxal (-)
- Refractive index: nα=1.50-1.51, nβ=1.51-1.52, nγ=1.51-1.52 (approximated)
- Common impurities: Mg, Fe

Nickelblödite is a rare nickel sulfate mineral with the formula Na_{2}Ni(SO_{4})_{2}·4H_{2}O. Nickelblödite was discovered in nickel mines in Carr Boyd Rocks and Kambalda, Western Australia. The mineral is a nickel-analogue of blödite, changoite, cobaltoblödite and manganoblödite - other representatives of the blödite group.

Nickelblödite contains small admixtures of magnesium and iron.

Minerals associating with nickelblödite include violarite, morenosite, halite, pyrite, and siderite.

== Features ==
Nickelblodite is a sulfate of the chemical formula Na_{2}Ni(SO_{4})_{2}·4H_{2}O. It crystallizes in the monoclinic system. It is usually found in the form of flat crystals, up to 150 microns, with soft shapes probably rounded by the solution, and in efflorescence. According to the Nickel-Strunz classification, nickelblödite belongs to "07.C - Sulfates (selenates, etc.) without additional anions, with H_{2}O, with medium and large cations".

== Formation and deposits ==
This mineral has been identified from specimens collected in two different locations in Western Australia: the Kambalda nickel mine in Coolgardie, and the Carr Boyd Rocks nickel mine in Menzies. It has only been described in two other places around the world: the sulfate deposit of Sohland an der Spree, in Upper Lusatia, Germany and the Km-3 mine in Lavrio, Greece.
