= Changoite =

Rare zinc sulfate mineral

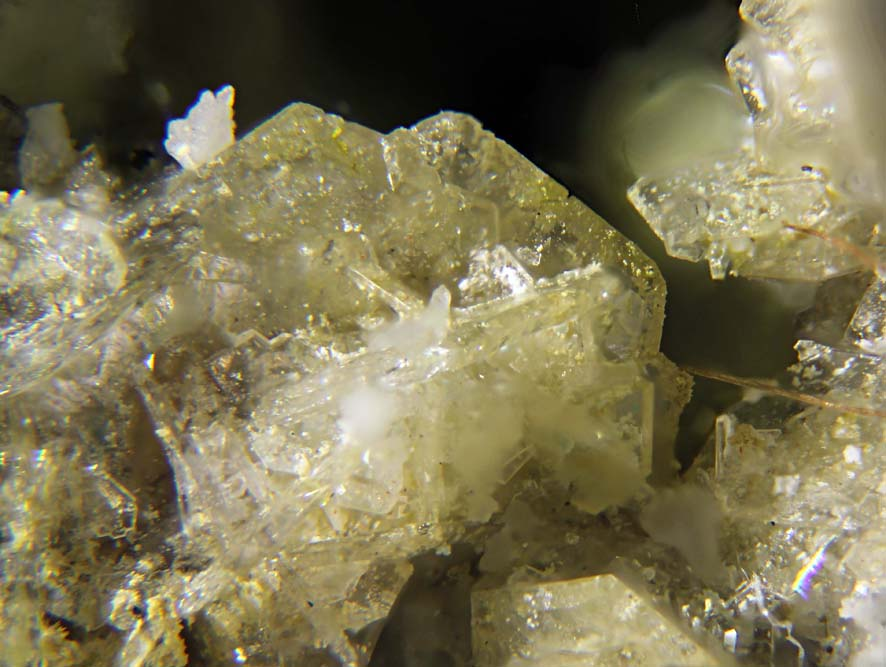
- Yellowish crystals of changoite associated to hexagonal colorless caracolite in an aesthetic combination.

General
- Category: Sulfate mineral
- Formula: Na_{2}Zn(SO_{4})_{2}·4H_{2}O
- IMA symbol: Cgo
- Strunz classification: 7.CC.50 (10 ed); 6/C.18-25 (8 ed)
- Crystal system: Monoclinic
- Crystal class: Prismatic (2/m) (same H-M symbol)
- Space group: P2_{1}/a
- Unit cell: a = 11.08, b = 8.25, c = 5.53 [Å], β = 100.18° (approximated); Z = 2

Identification
- Color: Colorless
- Crystal habit: Anhedral crystals, in small veins
- Mohs scale hardness: 2-3
- Luster: Vitreous
- Streak: White
- Diaphaneity: Transparent
- Specific gravity: 2.50 (measured)
- Optical properties: Biaxal (-)
- Refractive index: nα=1.51, nβ=1.51, nγ=1.52 (approximated)
- 2V angle: 83° (calculated)

Changoite is a rare zinc sulfate mineral with the formula Na_{2}Zn(SO_{4})_{2}·4H_{2}O. Chagoite was discovered in the San Francisco Mine near Sierra Gorda, Antofagasta, Chile. The mineral is a zinc-analogue of blödite, cobaltoblödite, manganoblödite and nickelblödite - other representatives of the blödite group. In terms of chemistry changoite is somewhat similar to gordaite. The mineral's name comes from the Chango people, a group of early inhabitants of northern Chile.

Traces of magnesium and calcium in changoite are negligible.

Minerals associating with changoite are gypsum, zinc-bearing paratacamite, and thénardite.
