= Slavíkite =

Mineral consisting of hydrous basic magnesium ferric sulphate

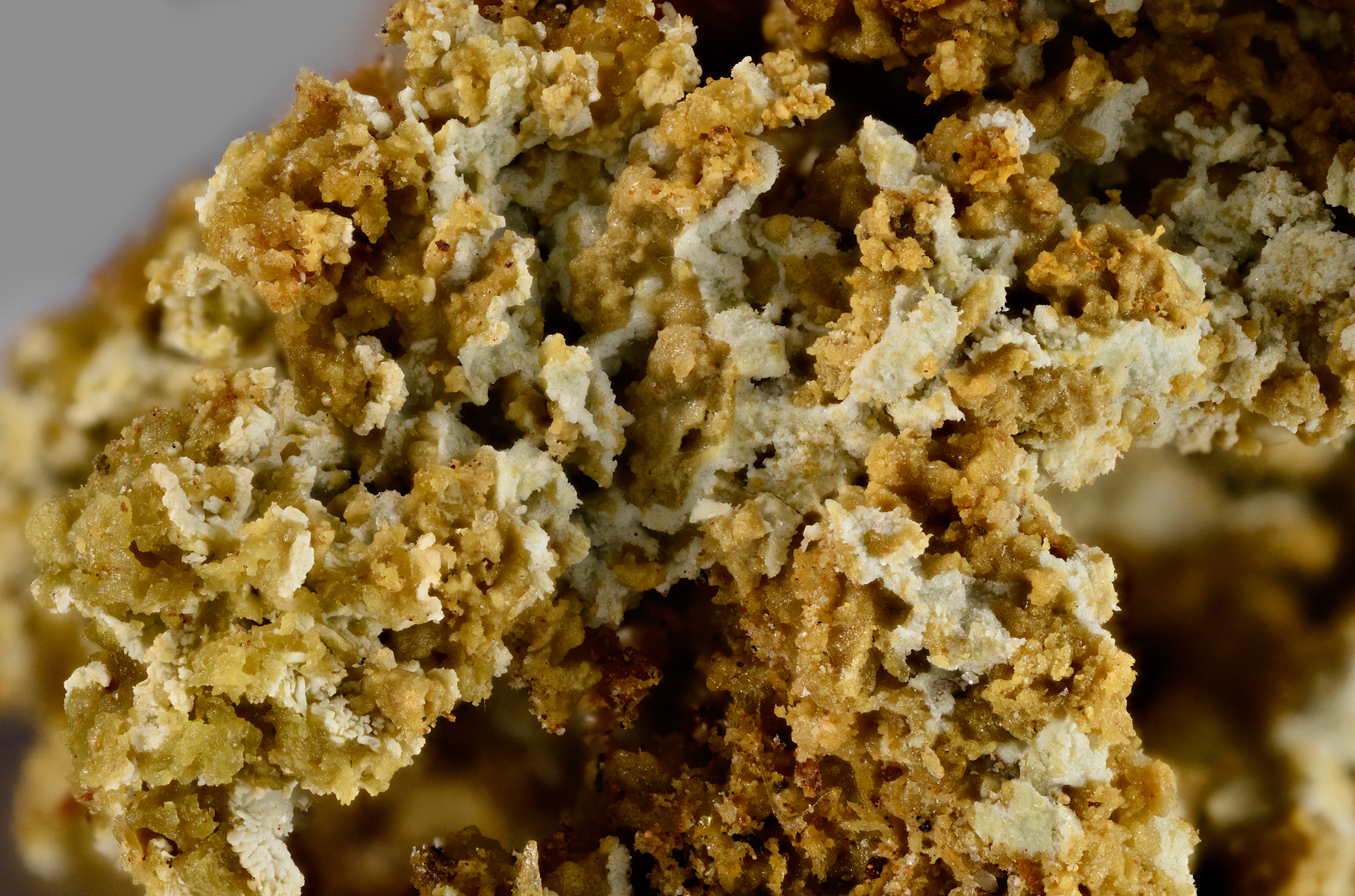
- Alpersite crystals (white) with slavíkite

General
- Category: Minerals
- Formula: (H_{3}O^{+})_{3}Mg_{6}Fe_{15}(SO_{4})_{21}(OH)_{18}·98H_{2}O
- IMA symbol: Sví
- Crystal system: Trigonal
- Crystal class: Rhombohedral (3̅m); H-M symbol: (3̅m)

Identification
- Color: Pale yellow, pale yellow-green
- Mohs scale hardness: 3.5
- Luster: Vitreous, Dull
- Specific gravity: 1.905 - 1.99

Slavíkite (IMA symbol: Sví) is a mineral consisting of a hydrous basic magnesium ferric sulfate with the chemical formula (H_{3}O^{+})_{3}Mg_{6}Fe_{15}(SO_{4})_{21}(OH)_{18}·98H_{2}O and is an oxidation product of pyrite in shales and slate from Bohemia. It was named in 1926 in honor of František Slavík, who was the Charles University in Prague where he was Dean of the Faculty of Science from 1924 to 1925 and Rector from 1937 to 1938.
