= Meridianiite =

Synthetic sulfate compound

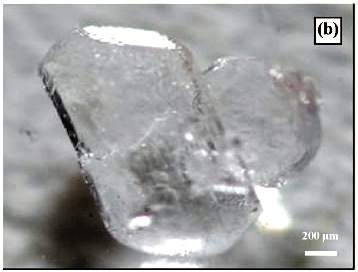
- Meridianiite crystals displaying blocky, triclinic, crystal forms.

General
- Category: Sulfate minerals
- Formula: Magnesium sulfate undecahydrate (MgSO_{4}·11H_{2}O)
- IMA symbol: Mdn
- Strunz classification: 7.CB.90
- Crystal system: Triclinic
- Crystal class: Pinacoidal (1̅) (same H–M symbol)
- Space group: P1̅
- Unit cell: a = 6.7459 Å b = 6.8173 Å c = 17.299 Å; α = 88.137°, β = 89.481°, γ = 62.719° Z = 2

Identification
- Formula mass: 318.55 g/mol
- Color: Colorless or white
- Crystal habit: Needle-shaped to broad flat crystals
- Tenacity: Brittle
- Luster: Vitreous – dull
- Streak: White
- Diaphaneity: Transparent
- Specific gravity: 1.512
- Melting point: At temperatures above 2 °C
- Solubility: Highly soluble in water

Meridianiite is the mineral consisting of magnesium sulfate undecahydrate, MgSO_{4}·11H_{2}O. It is colorless transparent crystalline salt that precipitates from solutions saturated in Mg^{2+} and SO^{2−}_{4} ions at temperatures less than 2 °C. The synthetic compound was formerly known as Fritzsche's salt.

Meridianiite is a naturally occurring mineral species found on Earth in a variety of environments including sea ice, crusts and efflorescences in coal/metal mines, cave systems, oxidized zones of sulfide deposits, salt lakes/playas and Antarctic ice-cores. It is commonly associated with other evaporite minerals such as epsomite, mirabilite, halides, and other sodium-magnesium-sulfates. There is some evidence that it was once present on the surface of Mars, and may occur in several bodies of the Solar System. As of 2012, it was the only undecahydrate sulfate known.

== Properties ==
Meridianiite belongs to the triclinic crystal system, having cell parameters a = 6.7459 Å, b = 6.8173 Å, c = 17.299 Å, a density of 1.512 g/cm^{3}, X-ray diffraction peaks at d-spacings of 5.73, 5.62, 5.41, 4.91, 4.85, 2.988, 2.958 (highest intensity), and 2.940, and is infrared-active. It produces needle-shaped to broad flat crystals that are clear to colorless-white.

Meridianiite decomposes incongruently above 2 °C to produce epsomite (MgSO_{4}·7H_{2}O) and water. Meridaniite and water have a eutectic point at −3.9 °C and 17.3% (mass) of MgSO_{4}.

Meridianiite can incorporate large proportions of other divalent cations (whose sulfates themselves do not seem to form an undecahydrate) as solid solution, without changes to its structure. These include nickel (up to about 27% of the cations replaced), zinc (up to about 27%), cobalt (up to about 67%), manganese(II) (about 62%), copper (about 8%), and iron(II) (about 8%).

At pressures of about 0.9 GPa and at 240 K, meridianiite decomposes into a mixture of ice VI and the enneahydrate MgSO_{4}·9H_{2}O,

== Discovery ==
In 1837 by C. J. Fritzsche described what he interpreted as magnesium sulfate dodecahydrate, based on the weight loss during dehydration to the anhydrous salt. The substance was referred to as "Fritzsche's salt" and not formally given a mineral name or designation.

The crystal structure was later resolved by Peterson and Wang in 2006, revealing that it belonged to the triclinic crystal system, and each formula unit included 11 molecules of water, not 12.

The name "meridianiite" is derived from Meridiani Planum, the locality on Mars where it is believed to have existed in the past. The mineral species and the name were approved by the Commission on New Mineral Names and Mineral Nomenclature of the International Mineralogical Association in November 2007.

== Occurrence on Earth ==
Meridianiite has been found to occur on the surface of the ice layer formed in winter over the ponds known as Basque Lakes, in Canada. The water in those ponds has a high concentration of magnesium sulfate and other salts. Water seeping through the ice layer evaporates at the surface leaving a deposit of crystalline meridianiite.

Meridianiite has also been detected in sea-ice collected in winter from the saline Lake Saroma in Japan, as well as in ice cores from Dome Fuji station, Antarctica, near the summit of the east Dronning Maud Land plateau.

== Extraterrestrial occurrence ==
Imagery of the massive sulfate deposits sent back by the NASA Opportunity rover in Meridiani Planum show numerous needle-shaped void spaces throughout the deposit. The now empty angular holes are interpreted as being cavities once filled by a highly soluble mineral species, most likely a magnesium sulfate. These cavities are observed to closely match the crystal habit of meridianiite, and have been proposed as sites where crystals of meridianiite were located, having subsequently dissolved when environmental conditions rendered the crystal unstable. Due to the decomposition of meridianiite to 70% epsomite and 30% water, it has been proposed that meridianiite may represent a periodic reservoir of water near the Martian surface. During warmer periods in Mars’s history it is possible that triggered melting of this mineral may help explain the occurrence of some of the chaotic, and short lived, surface-water episodes throughout Martian history.

Remote sensing of other planetary bodies has also indicated the presence of numerous hydrated mineral species, including sulfates, near various planetary surfaces, a prominent example of which is Jupiter’s moon Europa. The relatively smooth, and very young surface of Europa has been interpreted as evidence for a putative ocean beneath the moons icy surface, and is therefore suggestive of liquid brine at depth. Due to the cryospheric conditions present on Europa it is likely that any magnesium sulfate minerals present, and in contact with liquid water, would inherently occur as meridianiite, and thus, it may make up an important mineral phase, and liquid water reservoir at depth.

== Gallery ==
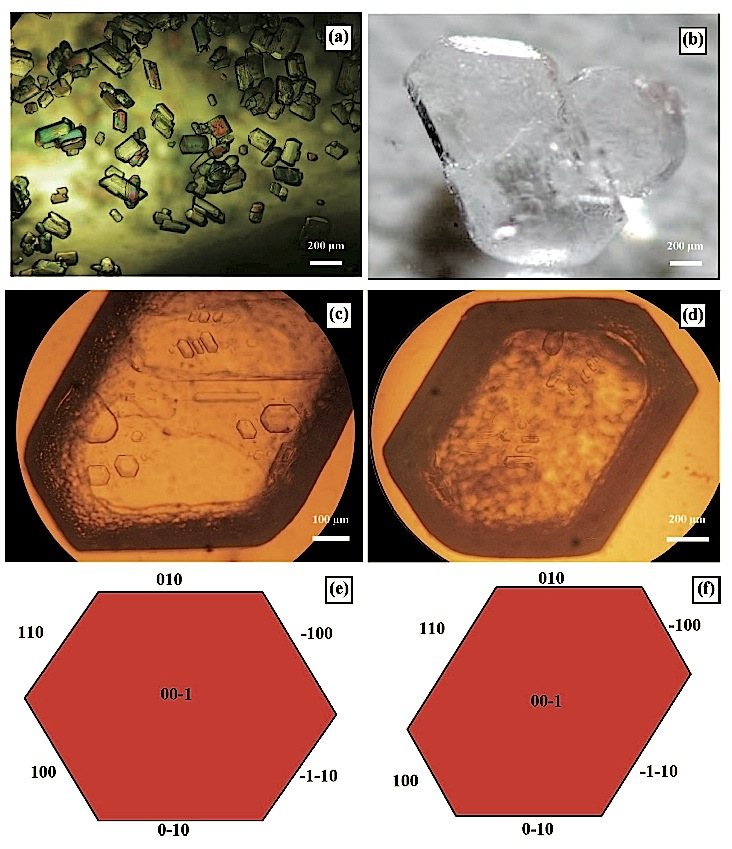
Figure 1. (a, b, d) Optical images of meridianiite, MgSO_{4}·11H_{2}O. Courtesy Genceli et al. 2007.

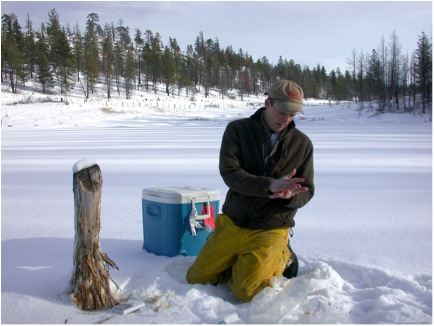
Figure 2. Sampling of meridianiite off a wooden post. Courtesy R. Peterson 2010.

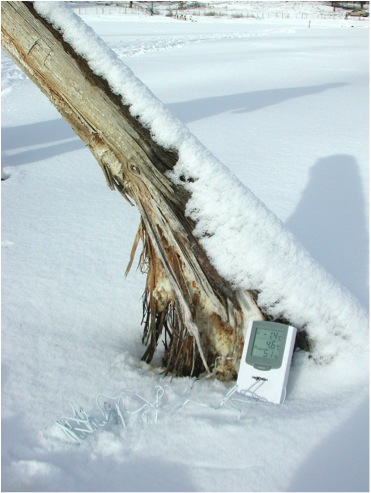
Figure 3. Type occurrence of meridianiite at Basque Lake No. 1. Courtesy R. Peterson 2010.

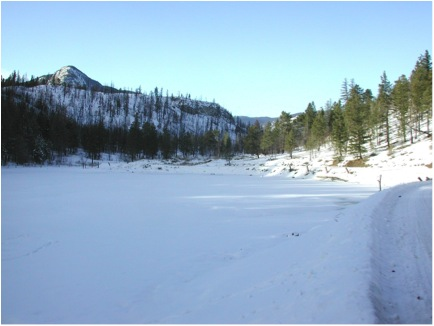
Figure 4. Meridianiite mineral type locality; Basque Lake No. 1 as seen in winter 2007. Courtesy R. Peterson 2010.

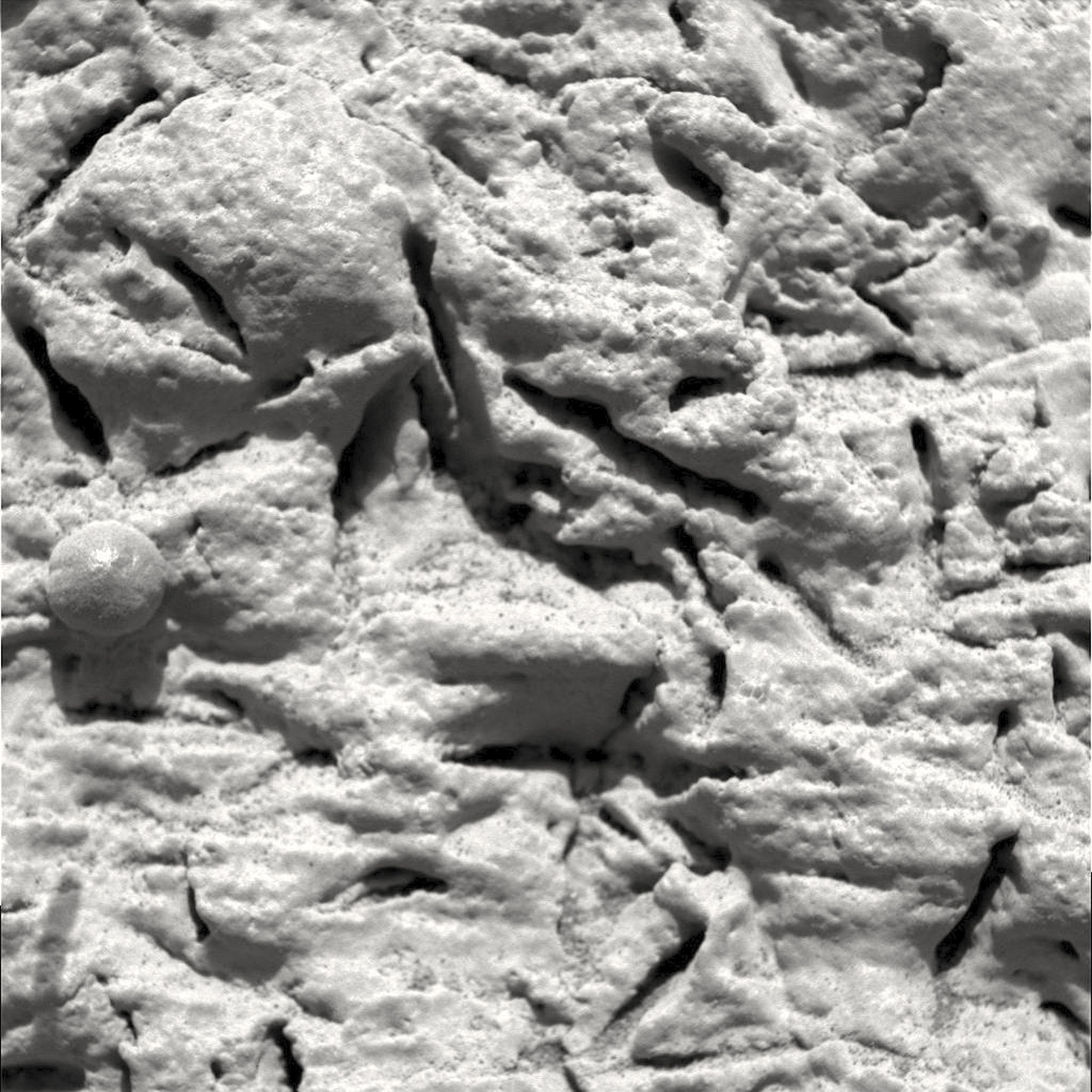
Figure 5. Long needle-shaped crystal void cavities as observed by the NASA Opportunity Rover at Meridiani Planum, Mars. Image courtesy R. Peterson 2010, and NASA.

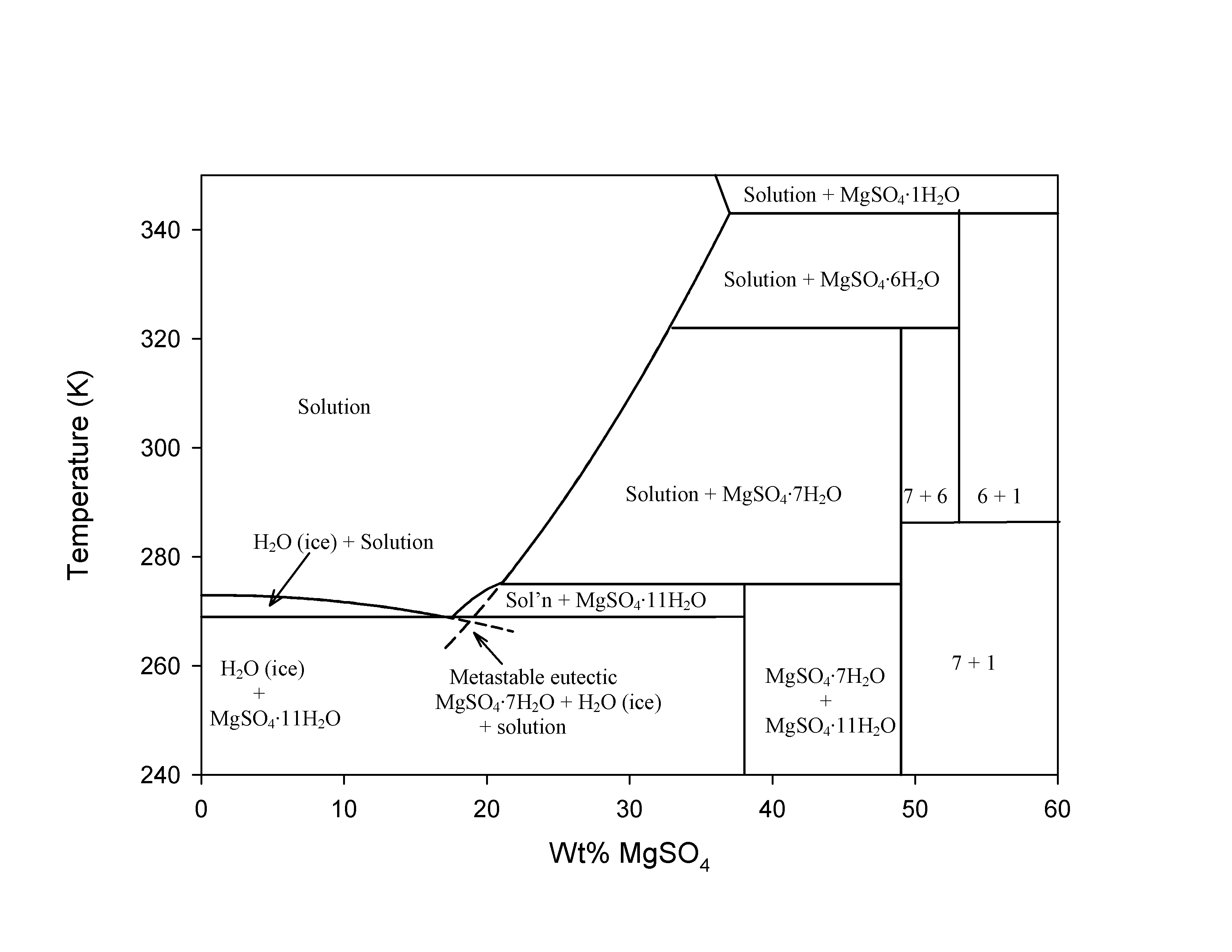
Figure 6. Temperature vs. weight % MgSO_{4} diagram depicting the stability ranges of the various pure magnesium sulfate hydrated salts. Courtesy R. Peterson 2010.

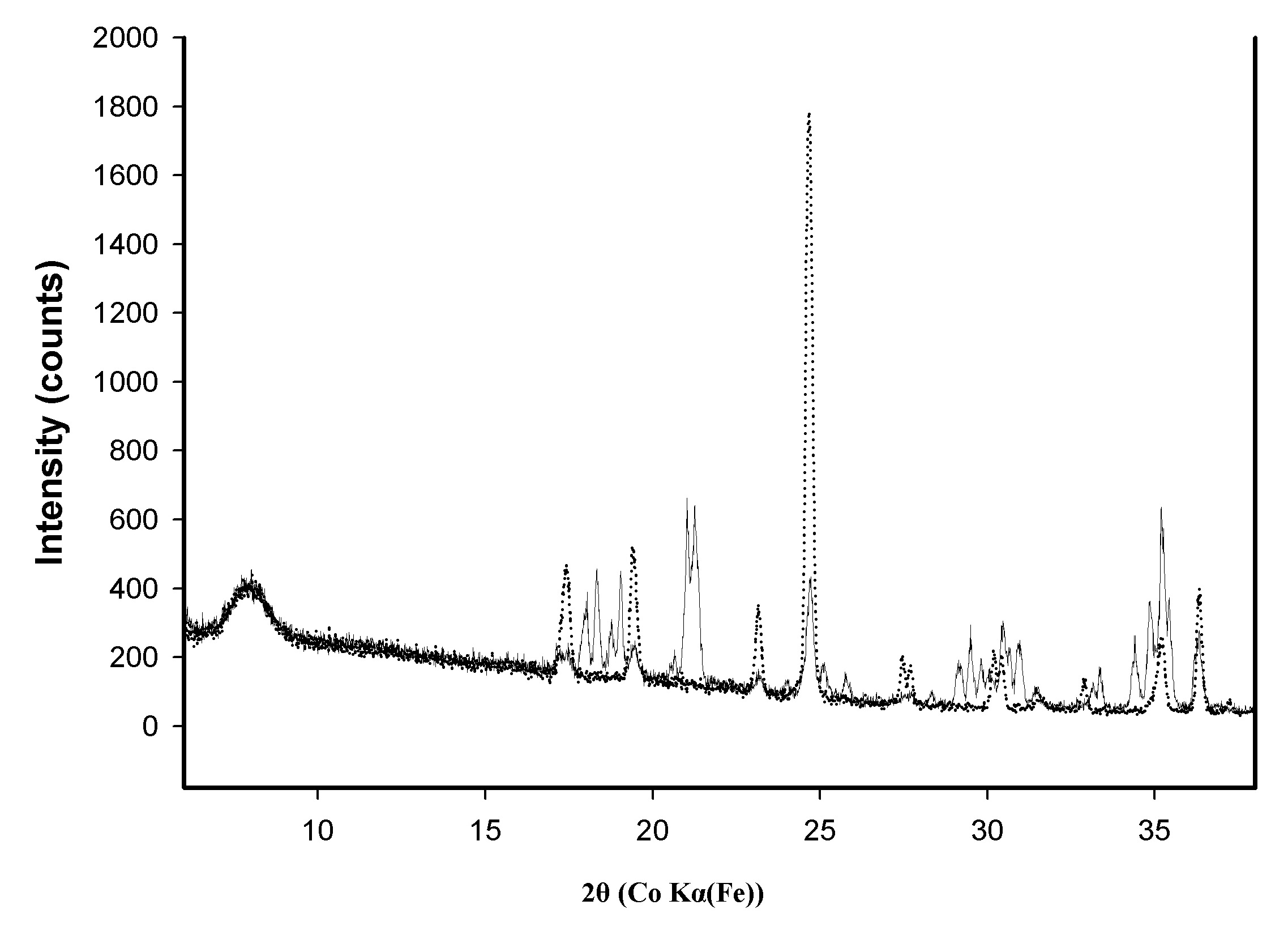
Figure 7. X-Ray diffraction data obtained using a Cobalt source for the magnesium sulfate hydrate, Meridianiite. The dotted line is representative of the ideal intensity and spectral pattern of meridianiite. Courtesy R. Peterson 2010.

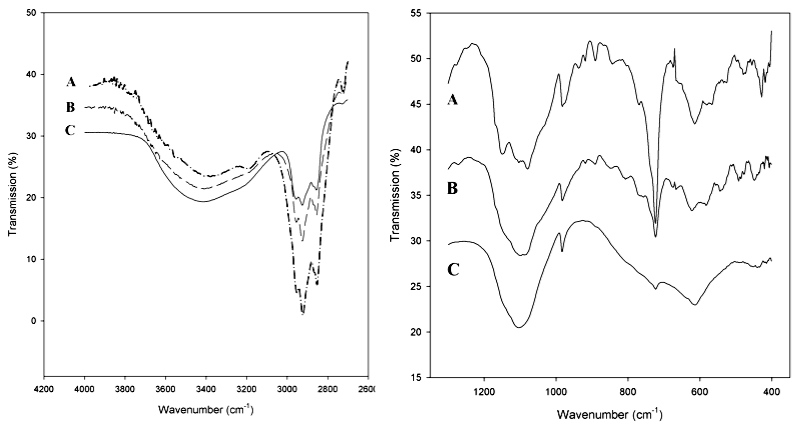
Figure 8. Infrared absorption of meridianiite. Courtesy R. Peterson 2010.
