= Sodium magnesium sulfate =

Chemical compound

Sodium magnesium sulfate is a double sulfate of sodium and magnesium. There are a number of different stoichiometries and degrees of hydration with different crystal structures, and many are minerals. Members include:

- Blödite or bloedite: sodium magnesium sulfate tetrahydrate Na_{2}Mg(SO_{4})_{2}•4H_{2}O
- Disodium magnesium disulfate decahydrate Na_{2}Mg(SO_{4})_{2}•10H_{2}O
- Disodium magnesium disulfate hexadecahydrate Na_{2}Mg(SO_{4})_{2}•16H_{2}O
- Na_{2}SО_{4}·MgSO_{4}·2.5H_{2}O
- Konyaite Na_{2}Mg(SO_{4})_{2}•5H_{2}O
- Löweite Na_{12}Mg_{7}(SO_{4})_{13}•15H_{2}O.
- Vanthoffite Na_{6}Mg(SO_{4})_{4}
- Na_{2}Mg_{2}(SO_{4})_{3} langbeinite form stable from 569.2 to 624.7°C
- Na_{2}Mg_{2}(SO_{4})_{3} quenched monoclinic form
- Na_{2}Mg_{3}(SO_{4})_{4} orthorhombic form
- Na_{2}Mg(SO_{4})_{2} triclinic form

Salts containing other anions in addition to sulfate

- Na_{2}Mg_{3}(OH)_{2}(SO_{4})_{4}•4H_{2}O
- Tychite hexasodium dimagnesium sulfate tetracarbonate Na_{6}Mg_{2}SO_{4}(CO_{3})_{4}
- Uklonskovite NaMgSO_{4}F•2H_{2}O
