= Magnesium sulfate =

Chemical compound with formula MgSO_{4}

- Magnesium sulfate hexahydrate

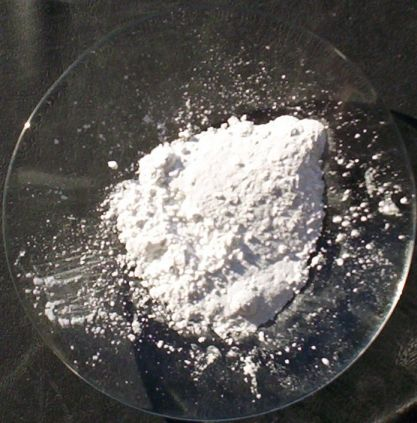
- Anhydrous magnesium sulfate

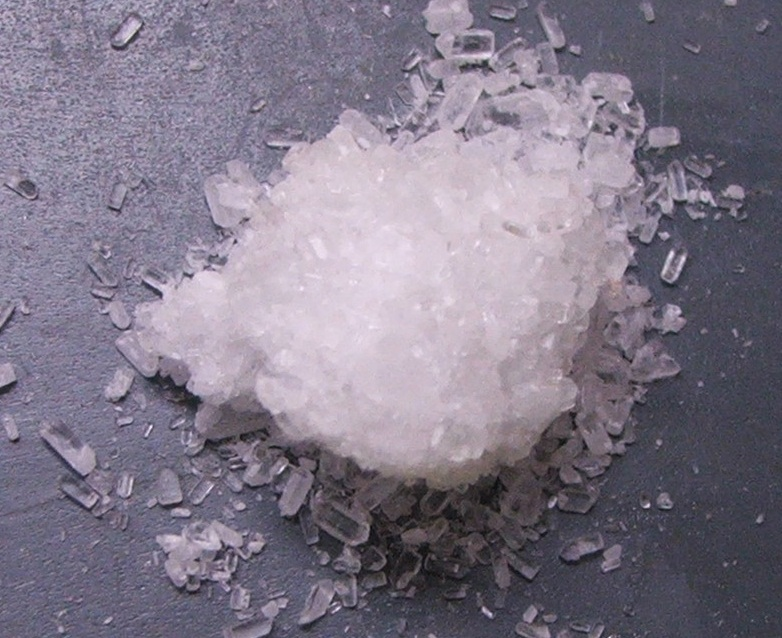
- Epsomite (Magnesium sulfate heptahydrate)

Names
- IUPAC name Magnesium sulfate
- Other names: Epsom salt (Magnesium sulfate heptahydrate); English salt; Bitter salts; Bath salt

Identifiers
CAS Number	7487-88-9 (anhydrous); 14168-73-1 (monohydrate); 10034-99-8 (heptahydrate)
3D model (JSmol)	anhydrate: Interactive image; hexahydrate: Interactive image
ChEBI	CHEBI:32599 (anhydrous); CHEBI:31795 (heptahydrate)
ChEMBL	ChEMBL2021423 (anhydrous); ChEMBL3989857 (heptahydrate)
ChemSpider	22515
DrugBank	DB00653
ECHA InfoCard	100.028.453
EC Number	231-298-2
KEGG	C12505 (heptahydrate)
PubChem CID	24083
RTECS number	OM4500000
UNII	ML30MJ2U7I (anhydrous); E2L2TK027P (monohydrate); SK47B8698T (heptahydrate)
CompTox Dashboard (EPA)	DTXSID6042105
- InChI: InChI=1S/Mg.H2O4S/c;1-5(2,3)4/h;(H2,1,2,3,4)/q+2;/p-2 Key: CSNNHWWHGAXBCP-UHFFFAOYSA-L
- SMILES: anhydrate: [Mg+2].[O-]S([O-])(=O)=O; hexahydrate: [OH2+][Mg-4]([OH2+])([OH2+])([OH2+])([OH2+])[OH2+].[O-]S(=O)(=O)[O-]

Properties
Chemical formula	MgSO_{4}
Molar mass	120.366 g/mol (anhydrous); 138.38 g/mol (monohydrate); 174.41 g/mol (trihydrate); 210.44 g/mol (pentahydrate); 228.46 g/mol (hexahydrate); 246.47 g/mol (heptahydrate)
Appearance	white crystalline solid
Odor	odorless
Density	2.66 g/cm^{3} (anhydrous); 2.445 g/cm^{3} (monohydrate); 1.68 g/cm^{3} (heptahydrate); 1.512 g/cm^{3} (undecahydrate)
Melting point	decomposes; 1,124 °C (2,055 °F) (anhydrous); 200 °C (392 °F) (monohydrate); 150 °C (302 °F) (heptahydrate); 2 °C (36 °F) (undecahydrate)
Solubility in water	anhydrous; 26.9 g/100 mL @ 0 °C (32 °F); 35.1 g/100 mL @ 20 °C (68 °F); 50.2 g/100 mL @ 100 °C (212 °F); heptahydrate; 113 g/100 mL @ 20 °C (68 °F)
Solubility product (K_{sp})	738 (502 g/L)
Solubility in diethyl ether	1.16 g/100 mL @ 18 °C (64 °F)
Solubility in ethanol	slight
Solubility in glycerol	slight
Magnetic susceptibility (χ)	−50×10^{−6} cm^{3}/mol
Refractive index (n_{D})	1.523 (monohydrate); 1.433 (heptahydrate)

Structure
Crystal structure	monoclinic (hydrate)

Pharmacology
ATC code	A06AD04 (WHO) A12CC02 (WHO) B05XA05 (WHO) D11AX05 (WHO) V04CC02 (WHO)

Hazards
- GHS labelling
Pictograms	(GHS07: Exclamation mark)
Signal word	Warning
Hazard statements	H302, H312, H332
Precautionary statements	P261, P264, P270, P271, P280, P301+P317, P302+P352, P304+P340, P317, P321, P330, P362+P364, P501

Related compounds
Other cations	Beryllium sulfate; Calcium sulfate; Strontium sulfate; Barium sulfate; Iron(II) sulfate; Copper(II) sulfate
- Except where otherwise noted, data are given for materials in their standard state (at 25 °C [77 °F], 100 kPa). verify (what is ?) Infobox references

Magnesium sulfate or magnesium sulphate is a chemical compound, a salt with the formula MgSO_{4}, consisting of magnesium cations Mg^{2+} (20.19% by mass) and sulfate anions SO_{4}^{2−}. It is a white crystalline solid, soluble in water.

Magnesium sulfate is usually encountered in the form of a hydrate MgSO_{4}·nH_{2}O, for various values of n between 1 and 11. The most common is the heptahydrate MgSO_{4}·7H_{2}O, known as Epsom salt, which is a household chemical with many common uses, including bath salts. Magnesium sulfate has diverse clinical uses, several of which have national regulatory approval.

The main use of magnesium sulfate is in agriculture to correct soils deficient in magnesium (an essential plant nutrient because of the role of magnesium in chlorophyll and photosynthesis). The monohydrate is favored for this use; by the mid 1970s, its production was 2.3 million tons per year with production increasing to approximately 2.6 million tons in 2024. The anhydrous form and several hydrates occur in nature as minerals, and the salt is a significant component of the water from some springs.

== Natural occurrence ==
As Mg^{2+} and SO_{4}^{2−} ions are respectively the second most abundant cation and anion present in seawater after Na^{+} and Cl^{−}, magnesium sulfates are common minerals in geological environments. Their occurrence is mostly connected with supergene processes. Some of them are also important constituents of evaporitic potassium-magnesium (K-Mg) salts deposits.

Bright spots observed by the Dawn Spacecraft in Occator Crater on the dwarf planet Ceres are most consistent with reflected light from magnesium sulfate hexahydrate.

Almost all known mineralogical forms of MgSO_{4} are hydrates. Epsomite is the natural analogue of "Epsom salt". Meridianiite, MgSO_{4}·11H_{2}O, has been observed on the surface of frozen lakes and is thought to also occur on Mars. Hexahydrite is the next lower hydrate. Three next lower hydrates – pentahydrite, starkeyite, and especially sanderite – are rare. Kieserite is a monohydrate and is common among evaporitic deposits.

== Preparation ==
Magnesium sulfate is usually obtained directly from dry lake beds and other natural sources. It can also be prepared by reacting magnesite (magnesium carbonate, MgCO_{3}) or magnesia (oxide, MgO) with sulfuric acid (H_{2}SO_{4}):

H_{2}SO_{4} + MgCO_{3} → MgSO_{4} + H_{2}O + CO_{2}

Another possible method is to treat seawater or magnesium-containing industrial wastes so as to precipitate magnesium hydroxide and react the precipitate with sulfuric acid.

Also, magnesium sulfate heptahydrate (epsomite, MgSO_{4}·7H_{2}O) can be manufactured by dissolution of magnesium sulfate monohydrate (kieserite, MgSO_{4}·H_{2}O) in water and subsequent crystallization of the heptahydrate.

== Physical properties ==
Magnesium sulfate relaxation is the primary mechanism that causes the absorption of sound in seawater at frequencies above 10 kHz (acoustic energy is converted to thermal energy). Lower frequencies are less absorbed by the salt, so that low frequency sound travels farther in the ocean. Boric acid and magnesium carbonate also contribute to absorption.

== Uses ==
=== Medical ===
Magnesium sulfate is used both externally as bath salts, especially for foot baths to soothe sore feet, and internally as a replacement therapy for magnesium deficiency. It is commonly used in hospital settings to treat abnormal blood levels of magnesium as an electrolyte and for constipation.

Other potential uses include treatment of acute and severe arrhythmias, as a bronchodilator in the treatment of asthma, and for reducing the risk of seizures during eclampsia or cerebral palsy in preterm infants. The effectiveness and safety of magnesium sulfate for treating acute bronchiolitis in children under the age of 2 years old is not well understood.

=== Agriculture ===
In agriculture, magnesium sulfate is used to increase magnesium or sulfur content in soil. It is most commonly applied to potted plants, or to magnesium-hungry crops such as potatoes, tomatoes, carrots, peppers, lemons, and roses. The advantage of magnesium sulfate over other magnesium soil amendments (such as dolomitic lime) is its high solubility, which also allows the option of foliar feeding. Solutions of magnesium sulfate are also nearly pH neutral, compared with the slightly alkaline salts of magnesium as found in limestone; therefore, the use of magnesium sulfate as a magnesium source for soil does not significantly change the soil pH. Contrary to the popular belief that magnesium sulfate is able to control pests and slugs, helps seeds germination, produce more flowers, improve nutrient uptake, and is environmentally friendly, it does none of the purported claims except for correcting magnesium deficiency in soils. Magnesium sulfate can even pollute water if used in excessive amounts.

Magnesium sulfate was historically used as a treatment for lead poisoning prior to the development of chelation therapy, as it was hoped that any lead ingested would be precipitated out by the magnesium sulfate and subsequently purged from the digestive system. This application saw particularly widespread use among veterinarians during the early-to-mid 20th century; Epsom salt was already available on many farms for agricultural use, and it was often prescribed in the treatment of farm animals that had inadvertently ingested lead.

=== Food preparation ===
Magnesium sulfate is used as:

- Brewing salt in making beer
- Coagulant for making tofu
- A food additive to add taste to bottled water.

=== Desiccant ===
Anhydrous magnesium sulfate is commonly used as a desiccant in organic synthesis owing to its affinity for water and compatibility with most organic compounds. During work-up, an organic phase is treated with anhydrous magnesium sulfate. The hydrated solid is then removed by filtration, decantation, or by distillation (if the boiling point is low enough). Other inorganic sulfate salts such as sodium sulfate and calcium sulfate may be used in the same way. One study found that magnesium sulfate is superior to sodium sulfate.

A highly quoted analysis of desiccants showed that magnesium sulfate is a slow desiccant, requiring several hours. The same study showed that it is not a particularly good desiccant in cases where truly anhydrous solutions are sought.

=== Construction ===
Magnesium sulfate is used to prepare specific cements by the reaction between magnesium oxide and magnesium sulfate solution. This cement is mainly used in the production of lightweight insulation panels, although its poor water resistance limits its usage.

Magnesium (or sodium) sulfate is also used for testing aggregates for soundness in accordance with ASTM C88 standard, when there are no service records of the material exposed to actual weathering conditions. The test is accomplished by repeated immersion in saturated solutions followed by oven drying to dehydrate the salt precipitated in permeable pore spaces. The internal expansive force, derived from the rehydration of the salt upon re-immersion, simulates the expansion of water on freezing. Magnesium sulfate is also used to test the resistance of concrete to external sulfate attack (ESA).

=== Aquaria ===
Magnesium sulfate heptahydrate is also used to maintain the magnesium concentration in marine aquaria which contain large amounts of stony corals, as it is slowly depleted in their calcification process. In a magnesium-deficient marine aquarium, calcium and alkalinity concentrations are difficult to control because not enough magnesium is present to stabilize these ions in the saltwater and prevent their spontaneous precipitation into calcium carbonate.

== Hydrates ==
Crystals of Magnesium sulfate dissolving and crystallizing in solution, photographed using compensated polarisation microscopy.

Magnesium sulfate can crystallize as several hydrates, including:

- Anhydrous, MgSO_{4}; unstable in nature, hydrates to form epsomite.
- Monohydrate, MgSO_{4}·H_{2}O; kieserite, monoclinic.
- Monohydrate, MgSO_{4}·H_{2}O; triclinic.
- MgSO_{4}·1.25H_{2}O or 4MgSO_{4}·5H_{2}O.
- Dihydrate, MgSO_{4}·2H_{2}O; orthorhombic.
- MgSO_{4}·2.5H_{2}O or 2MgSO_{4}·5H_{2}O.
- Trihydrate, MgSO_{4}·3H_{2}O.
- Tetrahydrate, MgSO_{4}·4H_{2}O; starkeyite, monoclinic.
- Pentahydrate, MgSO_{4}·5H_{2}O; pentahydrite, triclinic.
- Hexahydrate, MgSO_{4}·6H_{2}O; hexahydrite, monoclinic.
- Heptahydrate, MgSO_{4}·7H_{2}O ("Epsom salt"); epsomite, orthorhombic.
- Enneahydrate, MgSO_{4}·9H_{2}O, monoclinic.
- Decahydrate, MgSO_{4}·10H_{2}O.
- Undecahydrate, MgSO_{4}·11H_{2}O; meridianiite, triclinic.

As of 2017, the existence of the decahydrate apparently has not been confirmed. All the hydrates lose water upon heating. Above 320 °C (608 °F), only the anhydrous form is stable. It decomposes without melting at 1,124 °C (2,055 °F) into magnesium oxide (MgO) and sulfur trioxide (SO_{3}).

=== Heptahydrate ===
The heptahydrate takes its common name "Epsom salt" from a bitter saline spring in Epsom in Surrey, England, where the salt was produced from the springs that arise where the porous chalk of the North Downs meets the impervious London clay.

The heptahydrate readily loses one equivalent of water to form the hexahydrate. It is a natural source of both magnesium and sulphur. Epsom salts are commonly used in bath salts, exfoliants, muscle relaxers and pain relievers.

=== Monohydrate ===
Magnesium sulfate monohydrate, or kieserite, can be prepared by heating the heptahydrate to 120 °C (248 °F). Further heating to 250 °C (482 °F) gives anhydrous magnesium sulfate. Kieserite exhibits monoclinic symmetry at pressures lower than 2.7 gigapascals (27,000 atm) after which it transforms to phase of triclinic symmetry.

=== Undecahydrate ===
The undecahydrate MgSO_{4}·11H_{2}O, meridianiite, is stable at atmospheric pressure only below 2 °C (36 °F). Above that temperature, it liquefies into a mix of solid heptahydrate and a saturated solution. It has a eutectic point with water at −3.9 °C (25.0 °F) and 17.3% (mass) of MgSO_{4}. Large crystals can be obtained from solutions of the proper concentration kept at 0 °C (32 °F) for a few days. At pressures of about 0.9 gigapascals (8,900 atm) and at 240 K (−33 °C; −28 °F), meridianiite decomposes into a mixture of ice VI and the enneahydrate MgSO_{4}·9H_{2}O.

=== Enneahydrate ===
The enneahydrate MgSO_{4}·9H_{2}O is produced (by cooling a solution of MgSO_{4} and sodium sulfate (Na_{2}SO_{4}) in suitable proportions). The structure is monoclinic, with unit-cell parameters at 250 K (−23 °C; −10 °F): a=0.675 nm, b=1.195 nm, c=1.465 nm, β=95.1°, V=1.177 nm^{3} with Z=4. The most probable space group is P21/c. Magnesium selenate also forms an enneahydrate MgSeO_{4}·9H_{2}O, but with a different crystal structure.

== Double salts ==
Double salts containing magnesium sulfate exist. There are several known as sodium magnesium sulfates and potassium magnesium sulfates, such as langbeinite. A mixed copper-magnesium sulfate heptahydrate (Mg,Cu)SO_{4}·7H_{2}O was found to occur in mine tailings and was given the mineral name alpersite.

== See also ==
- Magnesium chloride
