= Alpersite =

Sulfate mineral

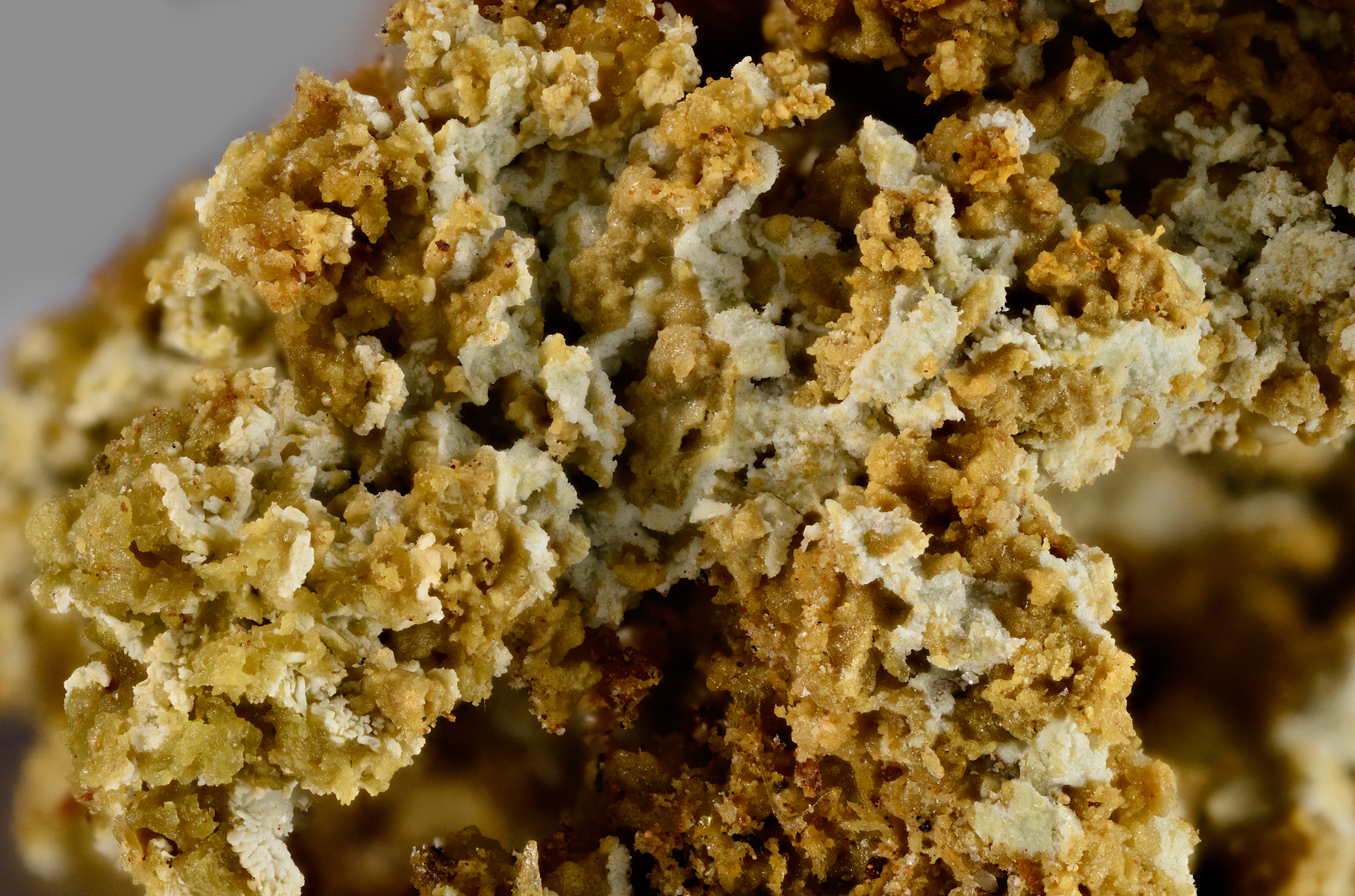
- Alpersite crystals (white) with slavíkite

General
- Category: Minerals
- Formula: (Mg,Cu)[SO_{4}]·7H_{2}O
- IMA symbol: Aps

Identification
- Color: Blue, pale blue, whitish, turquoise
- Fracture: Irregular/Uneven
- Tenacity: Brittle
- Mohs scale hardness: 2.5
- Luster: Vitreous
- Streak: White
- Diaphaneity: Transparent
- Specific gravity: 1.820

Alpersite (IMA symbol: Aps) is a magnesium copper sulfate mineral with the chemical formula (Mg,Cu)[SO_{4}]·7H_{2}O. It is named after United States Geological Survey geochemist Charles N. Alpers and was first described in 2006.
