= Kröhnkite =

Rare copper sulfate mineral

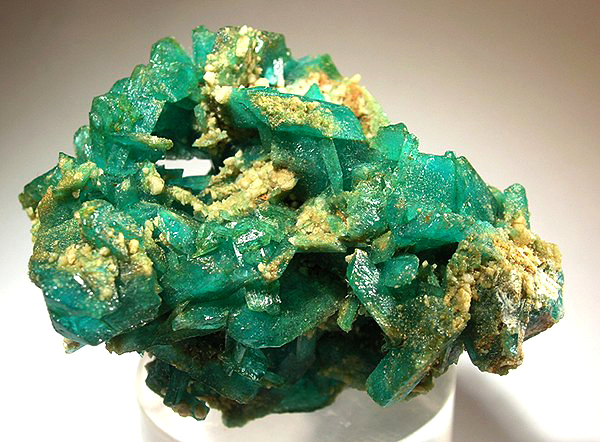

General
- Category: Sulfate mineral
- Formula: Na_{2}Cu(SO_{4})_{2}•2H_{2}O
- IMA symbol: Khk
- Strunz classification: 7.CC.30
- Crystal system: Monoclinic
- Crystal class: Prismatic (2/m) (same H-M symbol)
- Space group: P2_{1}/c
- Unit cell: a = 5.78 Å, b = 12.58 Å c = 5.48 Å; β = 108.3°; Z = 2

Identification
- Color: Blue, dark sky blue, greenish blue, yellowish green
- Crystal habit: Encrustations (on matrix), fibrous, massive
- Twinning: Common, sometimes heart-shaped
- Cleavage: Perfect {010}, good (011), very imperfect {101}
- Fracture: Conchoidal
- Mohs scale hardness: 2.5 – 3.0
- Luster: Vitreous
- Streak: White
- Diaphaneity: Transparent
- Specific gravity: 2.92
- Optical properties: Biaxial (-)
- Refractive index: n_{α} = 1.544 n_{β} = 1.578 n_{γ} = 1.601
- Birefringence: 0.057
- 2V angle: 78° measured
- Solubility: Readily soluble in water

Kröhnkite ( Na_{2}Cu(SO_{4})_{2}•2H_{2}O ) is a rare copper sulfate mineral named after B. Kröhnke who first researched it. Kröhnkite may be replaced by Saranchinaite, the anhydrous form of the mineral, if heated to temperatures above 200 °C (392 °F).

== Crystallography ==
Kröhnkite has monoclinic symmetry (2/m). Monoclinic symmetry implies that the mineral contains three axes of differing length (typically labeled a, b, and c), two of which intersect each other at 90° and one that intersects at an acute angle. Specifically, it belongs to the 2/m symmetry class meaning, the mineral has a 2-fold rotation axis about the b axis. It also has a unique motif of sulfate tetrahedra chains and copper octahedra aligned along the c axis and linked together by sodium atoms. Kröhnkite exhibits the optical property birefringence; the difference in the two refractive indices of a mineral. Because this mineral is birefringent, it must be anisotropic. Anisotropic minerals cause the velocity of light to vary depending on the direction of travel through the mineral. Kröhnkite is biaxial negative, which reveals that the mineral has two optic axes.

== Importance ==
Kröhnkite has the same general formula ( (X_{2}M(TO_{4})_{2}(H_{2}O)_{2}) ) as minerals which are found in environments affected by hydrothermal alteration, making it important in identifying where such alterations have occurred. Furthermore, the minerals sharing this composition are organized according to three crystal structure types, one being the unique kröhnkite structure which is often used to describe minerals exhibiting the same chain-like structure.

== Discovery and occurrence ==
Kröhnkite was first researched after an occurrence in the Chuquicamata Mine, Chile, and has been reported from a number of locations in the Atacama region. Associated minerals in the discovery location include atacamite, blodite, chalcanthite, antlerite and natrochalcite. It occurs in the oxidized zone of copper deposits in arid environments.
