= Manganoblödite =

Rare manganese mineral

General
- Category: Sulfate mineral
- Formula: Na_{2}Mn(SO_{4})_{2}·4H_{2}O
- IMA symbol: Mblö
- Crystal system: Monoclinic
- Crystal class: Prismatic (2/m) (same H-M symbol)
- Space group: P2_{1}/a
- Unit cell: a = 11.14, b = 8.28, c = 5.54 [Å], β = 100.42° (approximated); Z = 2

Identification
- Color: Colorless (grains), reddish-pink (aggregates)
- Crystal habit: Anhedral grains, in aggregates
- Cleavage: None
- Fracture: Uneven
- Mohs scale hardness: 2.5
- Luster: Vitreous
- Streak: White
- Diaphaneity: Transparent
- Specific gravity: 2.25 (measured), 2.34 (calculated) (approximated)
- Optical properties: Biaxal (-)
- Refractive index: nα=1.50, nβ=1.50, nγ=1.51 (approximated)
- Common impurities: Mg, Co, Ni

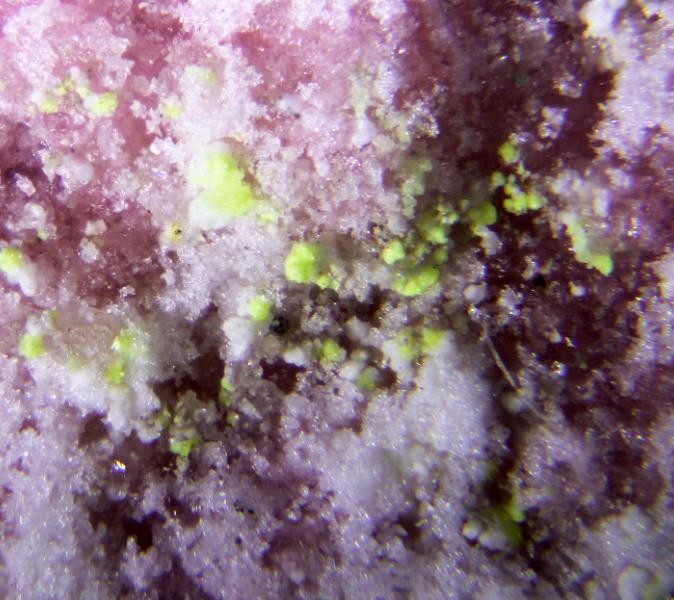
Yellow ottohahnite microcrystals associated to a mixture of manganoblödite & cobaltoblödite (confirmed by SEM-EDS) and also associated to bluelizardite and plasilite after the label. From Blue Lizard Mine, Red Canyon, San Juan County, Utah, United States of America. Ex. Erich Laskowski collection (USA).

Manganoblödite is a rare manganese mineral with the formula Na_{2}Mn(SO_{4})_{2}·4H_{2}O. Somewhat chemically similar mineral is D'Ansite-(Mn). Manganoblödite was found in the Blue Lizard mine, San Juan County, Utah, US, which is known for several relatively new secondary uranium minerals In the mine, manganoblödite occurs intimately intergrown with manganese-, cobalt- and nickel-enriched blödite and a yet another new mineral - cobaltoblödite. Manganoblödite, as suggested by its name is a manganese-analogue of blödite. It is also analogous to changoite, cobaltoblödite and nickelblödite - all three are members of the blödite group.

== Notes on chemistry ==
Manganoblödite is impure, containing admixtures of magnesium, cobalt and nickel.

== Association and origin ==
Besides blödite and cobaltoblödite, other minerals associated with manganoblödite include chalcanthite, gypsum, johannite, sideronatrite, a feldspar group mineral and quartz.
