= Magnesium selenate =

Identifiers
CAS Number	13446-28-1; hexahydrate: 13446-28-1
3D model (JSmol)	Interactive image; hexahydrate: Interactive image
ChemSpider	146305; hexahydrate: 34995534
ECHA InfoCard	100.035.508
EC Number	239-075-1
PubChem CID	167224; hexahydrate: 57348023
UNII	R20O08894A; hexahydrate: YZZ9F1163V
CompTox Dashboard (EPA)	DTXSID00884781; hexahydrate: DTXSID90721550
- InChI: InChI=1S/Mg.H2O4Se/c;1-5(2,3)4/h;(H2,1,2,3,4)/q+2;/p-2 Key: VWCLCSQRZVBEJD-UHFFFAOYSA-L; hexahydrate: InChI=1S/Mg.H2O4Se.6H2O/c;1-5(2,3)4;;;;;;/h;(H2,1,2,3,4);6*1H2/q+2;;;;;;;/p-2 Key: NVBTXYZNWLTXBQ-UHFFFAOYSA-L
- SMILES: [O-][Se](=O)(=O)[O-].[Mg+2]; hexahydrate: O.O.O.O.O.O.[O-][Se](=O)(=O)[O-].[Mg+2]

Properties
Chemical formula	MgSeO_{4}
Molar mass	167.26 g/mol
Appearance	Colorless crystals
Density	3.60 g/cm^{3} (anhydrous)
Solubility in water	Soluble in water

Structure
Crystal structure	Orthorhombic (anhydrous)
Lattice constant	a = 0.4925 nm, b = 0.9026 nm, c = 0.6816 nm
Formula units (Z)	4
- Except where otherwise noted, data are given for materials in their standard state (at 25 °C [77 °F], 100 kPa). Infobox references

Magnesium selenate is an inorganic compound of magnesium and the selenate ion, with the chemical formula MgSeO_{4}. It is a colorless, water-soluble salt and forms a large number of crystalline hydrates.

== Preparation ==
Magnesium selenate can be prepared by reaction of magnesium carbonate with selenic acid:

MgCO_{3} + H_{2}SeO_{4} → MgSeO_{4} + CO_{2}↑ + H_{2}O

The reaction may be carried out at approximately 60–70 °C, followed by crystallization of the hydrated salt from solution.

== Hydrates and solubility ==
Magnesium selenate forms an unusually large number of hydrates. Reported phases include the monohydrate, dihydrate, tetrahydrate, pentahydrate, hexahydrate, heptahydrate, enneahydrate and a hydrate of approximate composition MgSeO_{4}·4.5H_{2}O.

The stable hydrate depends strongly on temperature. The heptahydrate is stable below approximately 276.8 K, the hexahydrate between about 276.8 and 362.7 K, and the 4.5-hydrate above 362.7 K.

At 25 °C, the equilibrium solid phase is MgSeO_{4}·6H_{2}O. Its selected solubility in water is approximately 3.29 mol of MgSeO_{4} per kilogram of water.

== Crystal structures ==
Anhydrous MgSeO_{4} crystallizes in the orthorhombic crystal system, with lattice parameters approximately a = 4.925 Å, b = 9.026 Å and c = 6.816 Å.

The common hexahydrate, MgSeO_{4}·6H_{2}O, is monoclinic and crystallizes in space group C2/c (No. 15), with lattice parameters a = 10.224 Å, b = 7.370 Å, c = 24.866 Å and β = 98.41°, with eight formula units per unit cell.

Its structure consists of alternating layers of [Mg(H_{2}O)_{6}]^{2+} octahedra and SeO_{4}^{2−} tetrahedra, linked by hydrogen bonds.

The heptahydrate, MgSeO_{4}·7H_{2}O, is orthorhombic, space group P2_{1}2_{1}2_{1}. Its structure contains [Mg(H_{2}O)_{6}]^{2+}, SeO_{4}^{2−} and one additional lattice water molecule.

An enneahydrate, MgSeO_{4}·9H_{2}O, has also been characterized. It crystallizes in the monoclinic space group P2_{1}/c and contains isolated [Mg(H_{2}O)_{6}]^{2+} octahedra, SeO_{4}^{2−} tetrahedra and three lattice water molecules.

== Thermal dehydration ==
The hexahydrate loses water stepwise on heating. Intermediate products include the pentahydrate, tetrahydrate, dihydrate and monohydrate before anhydrous MgSeO_{4} is formed.

Typical dehydration stages occur near 78 °C for formation of the pentahydrate, 110 °C for the tetrahydrate, about 205 °C for the dihydrate and around 235 °C for the monohydrate.

X-ray diffraction measurements show that heating MgSeO_{4}·6H_{2}O through approximately 20–450 °C produces a sequence of crystalline and amorphous phases before crystalline anhydrous magnesium selenate is recovered.
