= Tamarugite =

Sulfate mineral

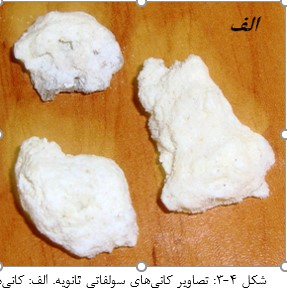

General
- Category: Sulfate mineral
- Formula: NaAl(SO_{4})_{2} · 6H_{2}O
- IMA symbol: Tmr
- Strunz classification: 7.CC.10
- Dana classification: 29.5.3.1
- Crystal system: Monoclinic
- Crystal class: Prismatic (2/m)
- Space group: P2_{1}/a (no. 14)

Identification
- Color: Colorless
- Crystal habit: Prismatic, tabular
- Twinning: Polysynthetic
- Cleavage: {010} perfect
- Mohs scale hardness: 3
- Luster: Vitreous
- Diaphaneity: Transparent
- Specific gravity: 2.07
- Density: 2.07 (measured)
- Optical properties: Biaxial (+), colorless (transmitted light)
- 2V angle: 60° (measured), 48° (calculated)
- Solubility: Soluble in water
- Other characteristics: Slightly astringent and sweet taste

Tamarugite (NaAl(SO_{4})_{2}·6H_{2}O) is a colorless monoclinic sulfate mineral.

Deposits containing tamarugite are geographically dispersed with occurrences of the mineral on all seven continents (Antarctica, Oceania, North America, South America, Europe, Asia, Africa). The mineral's name comes from the Tamarugal Pampa locality in Chile. It is also known as lapparentite.

== See also ==
- List of minerals

== Bibliography ==
- Palache, P.; Berman H.; Frondel, C. (1960). "Dana's System of Mineralogy, Volume II: Halides, Nitrates, Borates, Carbonates, Sulfates, Phosphates, Arsenates, Tungstates, Molybdates, Etc. (Seventh Edition)" John Wiley and Sons, Inc., New York, pp. 466–468.
