= Johannite =

Rare uranium sulfate mineral

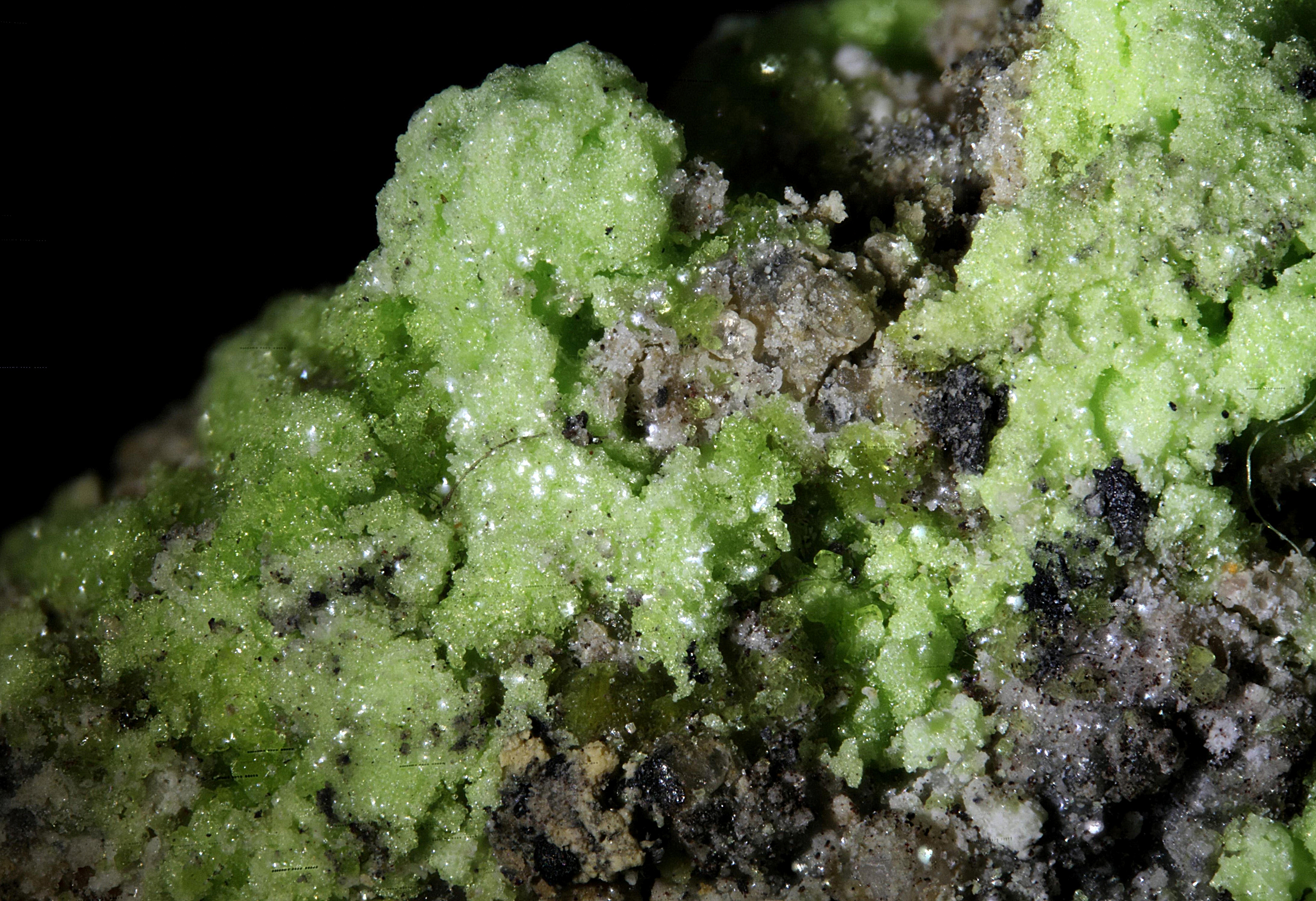

General
- Category: Sulfate mineral
- Formula: Cu[UO_{2}(OH)SO_{4}]_{2}·8H_{2}O
- IMA symbol: Jh
- Strunz classification: 7.EB.05 (10 ed); VI/D.21-10 (8 ed)
- Dana classification: 31.8.2.1
- Crystal system: Triclinic
- Crystal class: Pinacoidal (1̅) (same H-M symbol)
- Space group: P1̅

Identification
- Color: Emerald-green, apple-green
- Crystal habit: Prismatic, tabular, coatings
- Twinning: Simple and repeated lamellar twinning
- Cleavage: good on {100}
- Mohs scale hardness: 2 - 2.5
- Luster: Vitreous
- Streak: Pale green
- Diaphaneity: Transparent, Translucent
- Specific gravity: 3.32, 3.27 (calc.)
- Density: 3.32
- Optical properties: Biaxial (+/-)
- Refractive index: n_{α} = 1.572 - 1.577 ; n_{β} = 1.592 - 1.597 ; n_{γ} = 1.612 - 1.616
- Birefringence: δ = 0.040
- Pleochroism: strong: x= colorless; y= pale yellow; z= greenish yellow or canary-yellow
- 2V angle: 90°
- Other characteristics: Radioactive, Bitter taste

Johannite is a rare uranium sulfate mineral. It crystallizes in the triclinic crystal system with the chemical composition Cu[UO_{2}(OH)SO_{4}]_{2}·8H_{2}O. It crystallizes in the triclinic system and develops only small prism or thin to thick tabular crystals, usually occurs as flaky or spheroidal aggregates and efflorescent coatings. Its color is emerald-green to apple-green and its streak is pale green.

Johannite is a strong radioactive mineral with a calculated activity of 87,501,143 Bq/g (to the comparison: natural potassium: 31.2 Bq/g).

== Etymology and history ==
Johannite was first described in 1830 by Wilhelm Karl Ritter von Haidinger. It was named for Archduke John of Austria (1782–1859), the founder of the Landesmuseum Joanneum (Styria, Austria).

== Occurrence ==
Johannite forms as secondary mineral by oxidation from uraninite as well as different other uranium minerals.

Localities include Argentina, Czech Republic, France, Gabon, Germany, Greece, Italy, Switzerland, United Kingdom and the United States. Type locality is the “Elias Mine” in Jáchymov (Czech Republic).

== Crystal structure ==
Johannite crystallizes in the triclinic crystal system in the space group P1̅ with the lattice parameters a = 8.92 Å, b = 9.59 Å, c = 6.84 Å; α = 110°, β = 111.98°, γ = 100.3° and one formula unit per unit cell.

== Bibliography ==
- Palache, P.; Berman H.; Frondel, C. (1960). "Dana's System of Mineralogy, Volume II: Halides, Nitrates, Borates, Carbonates, Sulfates, Phosphates, Arsenates, Tungstates, Molybdates, Etc. (Seventh Edition)" John Wiley and Sons, Inc., New York, pp. 606–607.
