= Chalcanthite =

Sulfate mineral

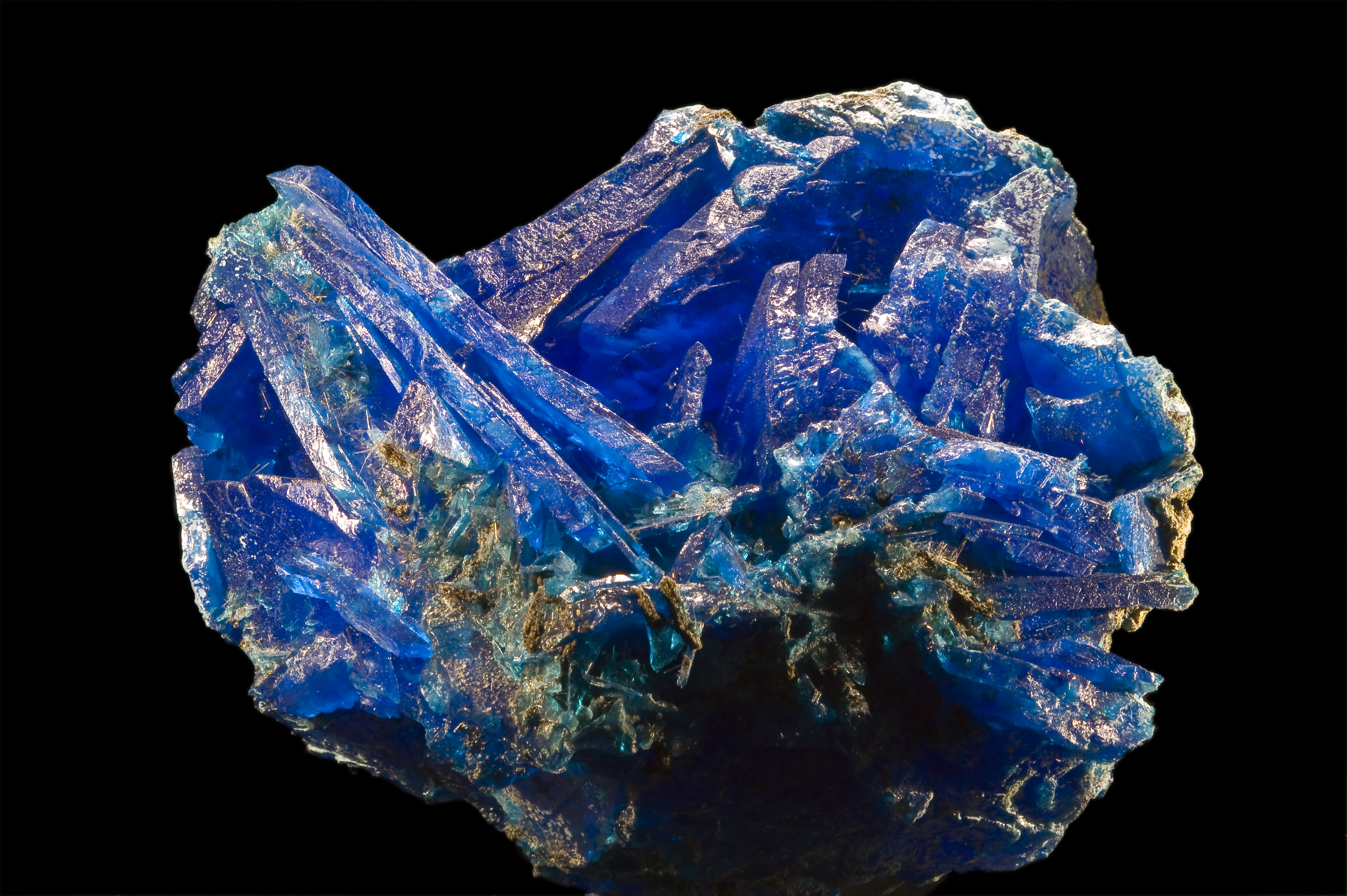

General
- Category: Sulfate mineral
- Formula: CuSO_{4}·5H_{2}O
- IMA symbol: Cct
- Strunz classification: 7.CB.20
- Crystal system: Triclinic
- Crystal class: Pinacoidal (1̅) (same H-M symbol)
- Space group: P1̅
- Unit cell: a = 6.11 Å, b = 10.673 Å, c = 5.95 Å; α = 97.58°, β = 107.17°, γ = 77.55°; Z = 2

Identification
- Color: Berlin blue to sky blue, greenish blue
- Crystal habit: Typically stalactitic, encrusted, reniform or massive. Natural crystals are rare, but are short prismatic or tabular
- Twinning: Rare as cruciform twins
- Cleavage: Perfect on {11̅0}; interrupted on {110}
- Fracture: Conchoidal
- Mohs scale hardness: 2.5
- Luster: Vitreous
- Streak: White
- Diaphaneity: Transparent to translucent
- Specific gravity: 2.12–2.3
- Optical properties: Biaxial (−)
- Refractive index: n_{α} = 1.514 n_{β} = 1.537 n_{γ} = 1.543
- Birefringence: δ = 0.029
- 2V angle: Measured: 56°
- Solubility: Soluble in water, turning it blue
- Other characteristics: Poisonous

Chalcanthite (from Ancient Greek χάλκανθον (khálkanthon), from χαλκός (khalkós) 'copper' and ἄνθος (ánthos) 'flower, bloom') is a richly colored blue-green water-soluble sulfate mineral CuSO_{4}·5H_{2}O. It is commonly found in the late-stage oxidation zones of copper deposits. Due to its ready solubility, chalcanthite is more common in arid regions.

Chalcanthite is a pentahydrate and the most common member of a group of similar hydrated sulfates, the chalcanthite group. These other sulfates are identical in chemical composition to chalcanthite, with the exception of replacement of the copper ion by either manganese as jokokuite, iron as melanterite, or magnesium as pentahydrite.

Other names include blue stone, blue vitriol, and copper vitriol.

== Uses of chalcanthite ==
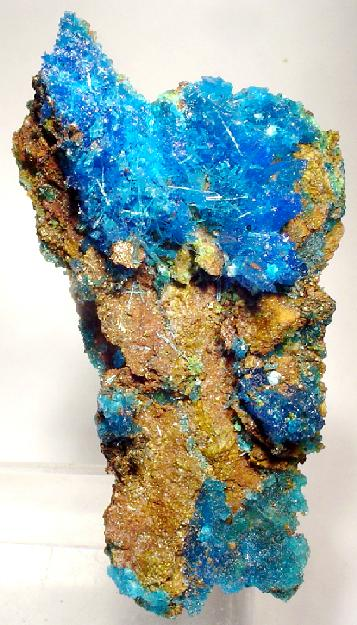
Chalcanthite on limonite from Washington Camp, Santa Cruz County, Arizona (size: 5.5 x 2.9 x 1.5 cm)

As chalcanthite is a copper mineral, it can be used as an ore of copper. However, its ready solubility in water means that it tends to crystallize, dissolve, and recrystallize as crusts over any mine surface in more humid regions. Therefore, chalcanthite is only found in the most arid regions in sufficiently large quantities for use as an ore.

Secondarily, chalcanthite, due to its rich color and beautiful crystals, is a sought after collector's mineral. However, as with its viability as an ore, the solubility of the mineral causes significant problems. First, the mineral readily absorbs and releases its water content, which, over time, leads to a disintegration of the crystal structure, destroying even the finest specimens. Therefore, limiting exposure to humidity during storage is critical to preservation. Second, higher quality crystals can be easily grown synthetically, leading to concerns that disreputable mineral dealers would present a synthetic sample as natural.

== Associated minerals ==
Given that chalcanthite is found in oxidized copper deposits, it is frequently found in association with other copper minerals. Frequently associated minerals include:

- Calcite and its polymorph, aragonite, both CaCO_{3}
- Brochantite, Cu_{4}(SO_{4})(OH)_{6}
- Chalcopyrite, CuFeS_{2}
- Malachite, Cu_{2}(CO_{3})(OH)_{2}
- Melanterite, FeSO_{4} · 7 H_{2}O

== Notes for identification ==
Chalcanthite's blue color is one of its most notable features, but it is insufficient in identification. Other useful tests include associated minerals, crystal habit, solubility and subsequent coloring of the water blue. Chalcanthite can also dye materials blue when dissolved in water, and has a peculiarly sweet and metallic taste, although consuming it can induce dangerous copper poisoning.

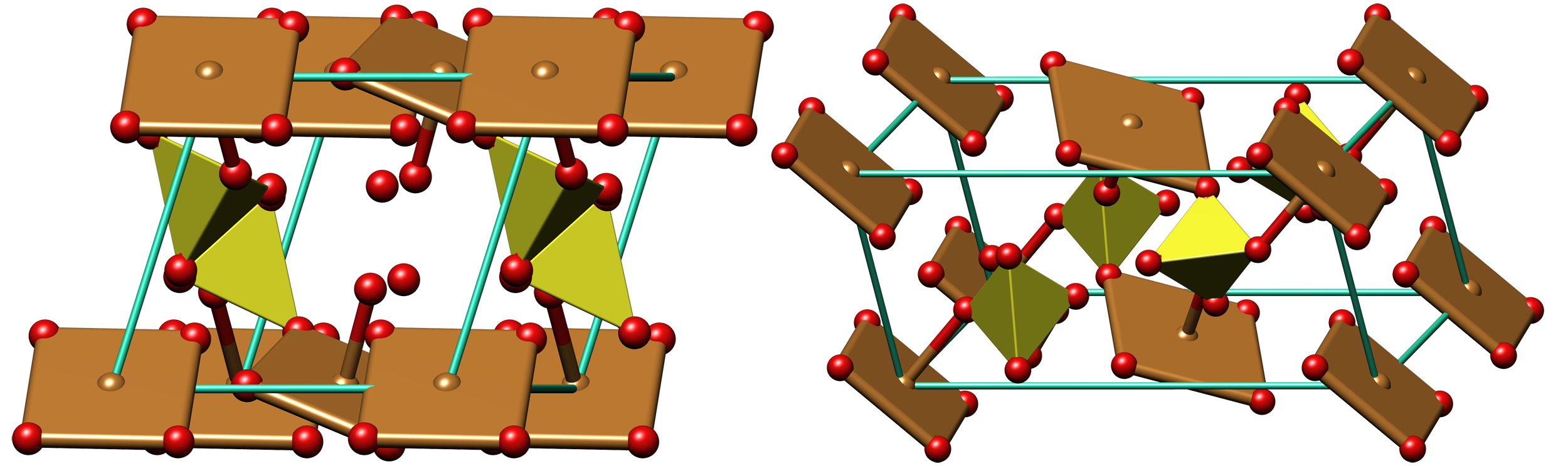
Crystal structure of chalcanthite Color code: :Copper, Cu: brown :Sulfur, S: olive :Oxygen, O: red :Cell: cyan

== See also ==
- Copper(II) sulfate
