= Blödite =

Sulfate mineral

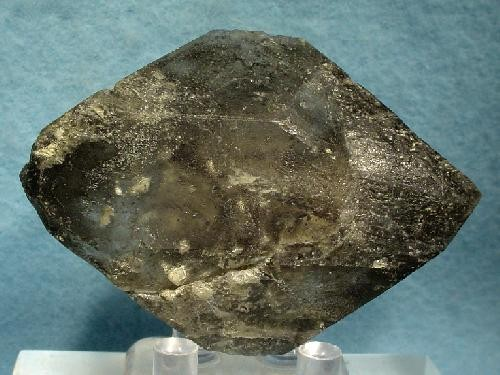
- Doubly terminated blödite crystal from Soda Lake, San Luis Obispo County, California (size: 7.0 × 4.8 × 1.9 cm)

General
- Category: Sulfate minerals
- Formula: Na_{2}Mg(SO_{4})_{2}·4H_{2}O
- IMA symbol: Blö
- Strunz classification: 7.CC.50
- Crystal system: Monoclinic
- Crystal class: Prismatic (2/m) (same H-M symbol)
- Space group: P2_{1}/a
- Unit cell: a = 11.04 Å, b = 8.15 Å, c = 5.49 Å; β = 100.41°; Z = 2

Identification
- Color: Colorless, yellow, may be dark gray, bluish green, or reddish due to inclusions
- Crystal habit: Prismatic to equant crystals, granular, massive
- Fracture: Conchoidal
- Tenacity: Brittle
- Mohs scale hardness: 2.5–3
- Luster: Vitreous
- Specific gravity: 2.23
- Optical properties: Biaxial (−)
- Refractive index: n_{α} = 1.483, n_{β} = 1.486, n_{γ} = 1.487
- Birefringence: δ = 0.004
- 2V angle: 71° (measured)

Blödite or bloedite is a hydrated sodium magnesium sulfate mineral with the formula Na_{2}Mg(SO_{4})_{2}·4H_{2}O. The mineral is clear to yellow in color often darkened by inclusions and forms monoclinic crystals.

Blödite was first described in 1821 for an occurrence in a salt deposit in Ischler Salzberg, Bad Ischl, Gmunden, Austria and named for German mineralogist and chemist Karl August Blöde (1773–1820).

It is found worldwide in evaporitic sedimentary environments such as the Great Salt Lake, Utah.

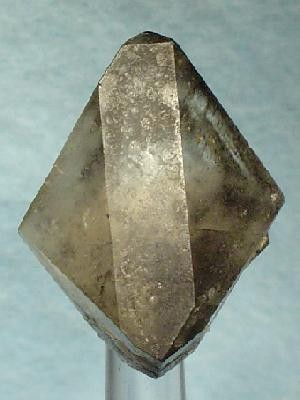
Crystal from Soda Lake (size: 2.9 × 2.2 × 1.4 cm)

== See also ==
- List of minerals
- List of minerals named after people
