= Copper silicate =

Copper silicate may refer to any silicate of copper generally; more specifically:

Minerals

- Apachite, a copper silicate mineral with a general formula of Cu_{9}Si_{10}O_{29}·11H_{2}O
- Dioptase, a cyclosilicate mineral - CuSiO_{3}·H_{2}O
- Gilalite, a copper silicate mineral with chemical composition of Cu_{5}Si_{6}O_{17}·7(H_{2}O).
- Plancheite, a hydrated copper silicate mineral with the formula Cu_{8}Si_{8}O_{22}(OH)_{4}•(H_{2}O)
- Shattuckite, a copper silicate hydroxide mineral with formula Cu_{5}(SiO_{3})_{4}(OH)_{2}
- Chrysocolla is a hydrated copper phyllosilicate mineral (with aluminum) with formula: Cu_{2−x}Al_{x}(H_{2−x}Si_{2}O_{5})(OH)_{4}·nH_{2}O (x<1)

Mixed metal copper silicate minerals

- Abswurmbachite, a copper manganese silicate mineral
- Ajoite is a hydrated sodium potassium copper aluminium silicate hydroxide mineral
- Ashburtonite, a rare lead copper silicate-bicarbonate mineral
- Iranite (Persian: ایرانیت), a lead copper chromate silicate mineral
- Kinoite, a copper silicate mineral with calcium
- Larimar, also called "Stefilia's Stone", is a rare blue variety of the silicate mineral pectolite that contains copper
- Papagoite, rare cyclosilicate mineral - calcium copper aluminium silicate hydroxide
- Scottyite, a barium copper silicate

Pigments

- Egyptian blue, also known as calcium copper silicate or cuprorivaite, a pigment used in ancient Egypt
- Han purple and Han blue, also called Chinese purple and Chinese blue, synthetic barium copper silicate pigments developed in China and used in ancient and imperial China onwards

== See also ==
- Copper silicide
