= Aminoffite =

Mineral, silicate

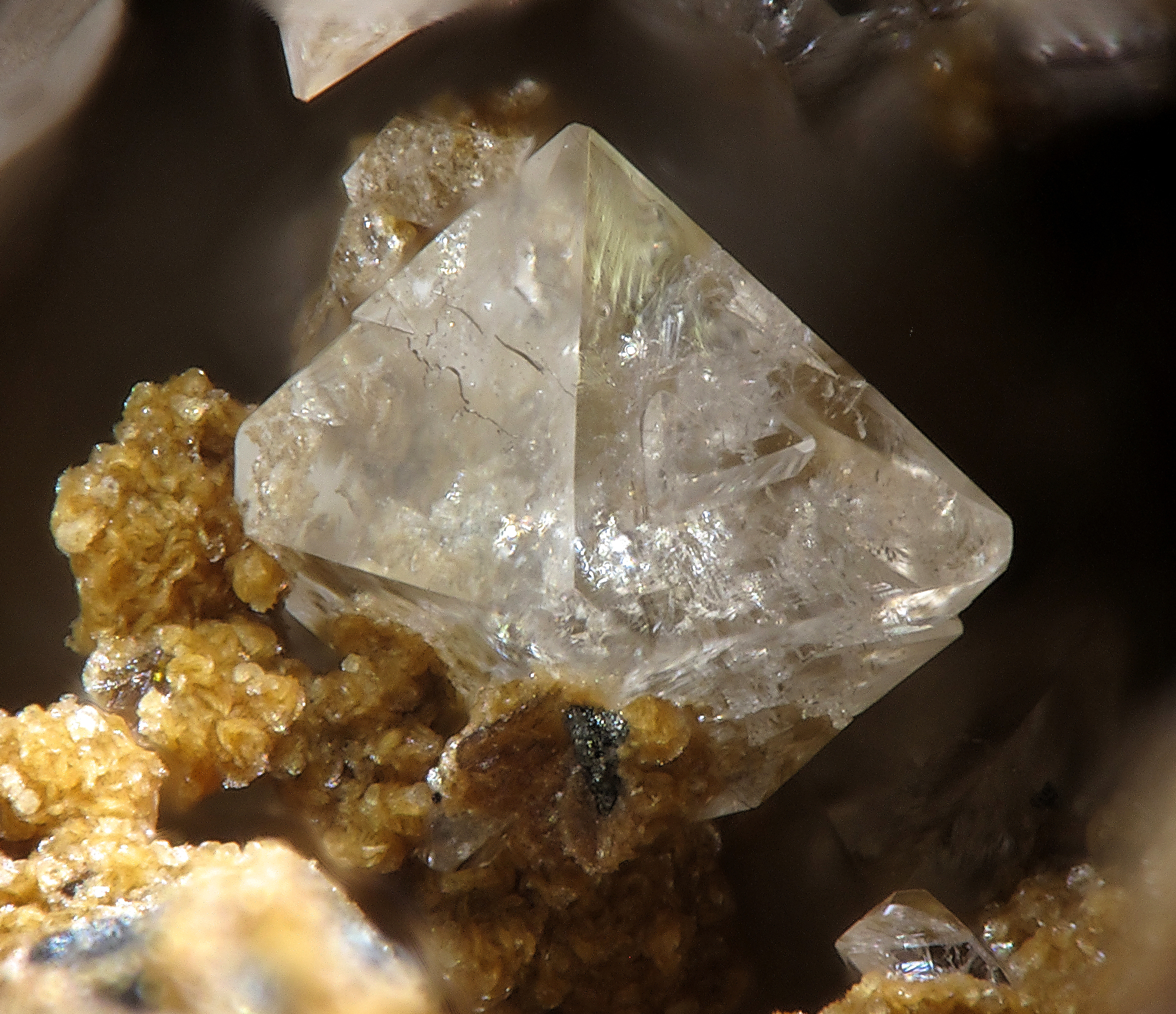
- Aminoffite from Långban, Filipstad of Värmland, Sweden

General
- Category: Silicate mineral
- Formula: Ca_{2}(Be,Al)(Si_{2}O_{7})(H_{2}O,OH)
- Strunz classification: 9.BH.05
- Crystal system: Tetragonal
- Unit cell: a = 9.8 Å, c = 9.91 Å

Identification
- Mohs scale hardness: 2.5–6.0

Aminoffite is a mineral of the silicate class. It was first described in 1937 and received its name to honor the Swedish mineralogist and artist Gregori Aminoff (1883–1947), who was an expert in the mineralogy of Långban and worked at the Swedish Museum of Natural History.

== Characteristics ==
Aminoffite is a silicate with the chemical formula Ca_{2}(Be,Al)(Si_{2}O_{7})(H_{2}O,OH). It crystallizes in the tetragonal system. Its hardness on the Mohs scale is between 5.5 and 6. According to the Nickel–Strunz classification, the aminoffite belongs to "09.BH - Sorosilicates with anions Si_{3}O_{10}, Si_{4}O_{11}, etc.; cations in tetrahedral coordination and greater coordination' along with the minerals kinoite, akatoreite, and fencooperite.

== Formation and deposits ==
Aminoffites are found as well-formed crystals in veins and cavities in massive magnetite and limonite. It is usually found associated with other minerals such as: magnetite, goethite, fluorite, calcite and baryte. It was discovered in 1937 in Långban, Filipstad of Värmland, Sweden. It has also been found in the alkaline massif in Dugdu of Tuva in Russia and Taronga of New South Wales in Australia.
