= Ruizite =

Sorosilicate mineral

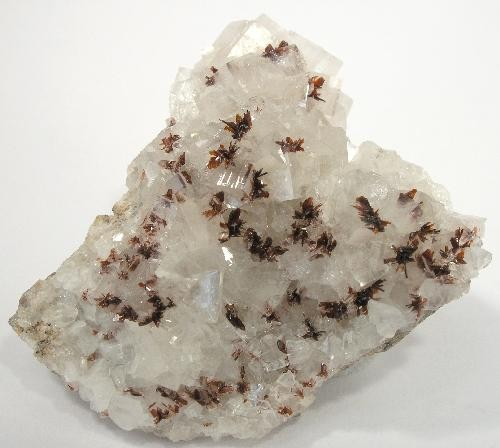
- Clusters of ruizite on calcite from South Africa

General
- Category: Sorosilicate
- Formula: Ca_{2}Mn_{2}Si_{4}O_{11}(OH)_{4}·2H_{2}O
- IMA symbol: Rz
- Strunz classification: 9.BJ.35
- Dana classification: 57.2.2.1
- Crystal system: Monoclinic
- Crystal class: Prismatic (2/m) (same H-M symbol)
- Space group: P2_{1}/c
- Unit cell: a = 11.95 Å, b = 6.17 Å c = 9.03 Å, β = 91.37°; Z = 4

Identification
- Color: Orange, red-brown
- Twinning: Common on {100}
- Mohs scale hardness: 5
- Streak: Apricot
- Diaphaneity: Translucent
- Optical properties: Biaxial (-)
- Refractive index: n_{α} = 1.663 n_{β} = 1.715 n_{γ} = 1.734
- Birefringence: δ = 0.071
- 2V angle: 60°

Ruizite is a sorosilicate mineral with formula Ca_{2}Mn_{2}Si_{4}O_{11}(OH)_{4}·2H_{2}O. It was discovered at the Christmas mine in Christmas, Arizona, and described in 1977. The mineral is named for discoverer Joe Ana Ruiz.

== Description and occurrence ==
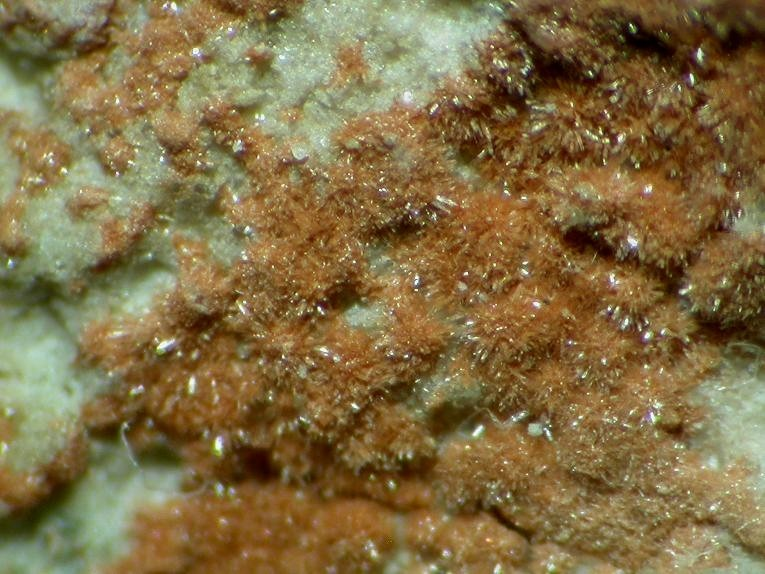
Ruizite from Arizona

Ruizite is translucent and orange to red-brown in color with an apricot yellow streak. The mineral occurs as euhedral prisms up to 1 mm (0.039 in) or as radial clusters of acicular (needle-like) crystals.

Ruizite is common at the Christmas mine. The mineral is known from Arizona, Pennsylvania, and Northern Cape Province, South Africa. Ruizite occurs in association with apophyllite, bornite, calcite, chalcopyrite, datolite, diopside, grossular, inesite, junitoite, kinoite, orientite, pectolite, quartz, smectite, sphalerite, vesuvianite, and wollastonite. Ruizite is found in veinlets or fracture surfaces of limestone metamorphosed into a calc-silicate assemblage. The mineral formed by retrograde metamorphism during cooling of a calc–silicate skarn assemblage in an oxidizing environment.

== Crystal structure and chemistry ==
Ruizite crystallizes in the monoclinic crystal system and twinning is common along the {100} plane between exactly two crystals. Ruizite's formula was originally identified as CaMn(SiO_{3})_{2}(OH)_{2}·2H_{2}O in 1977. In 1984, Frank C. Hawthorne revised the formula to Ca_{2}Mn_{2}Si_{4}O_{11}(OH)_{4}·2H_{2}O. Ruizite's structure consists of edge-sharing Mnφ_{6} octahedra, connected at corners into sheets and together into a lattice by clusters of Si_{4}O_{11}(OH)_{2}.

Nitric acid, hydrochloric acid, and potassium hydroxide have little effect on ruizite at low temperatures but readily dissolve the mineral at elevated temperatures.

== History ==
During the investigation of junitoite at the Christmas mine in Christmas, Arizona, Joe Ana Ruiz and Robert Jenkins discovered an unknown brown mineral. Mine geologist Dave Cook located better specimens, and it was determined to be a new mineral species. The mineral was named ruizite in honor of Joe Ruiz as discoverer. Ruizite's properties were analyzed using a sample provided by Joseph Urban, and it was described in the journal Mineralogical Magazine in December 1977. The International Mineralogical Association approved the mineral as IMA 1977-077. Type specimens are housed in the University of Arizona, Harvard University, the National Museum of Natural History, and The Natural History Museum.

== See also ==
- Carlosruizite
