= Hubeite =

Sorosilicate mineral

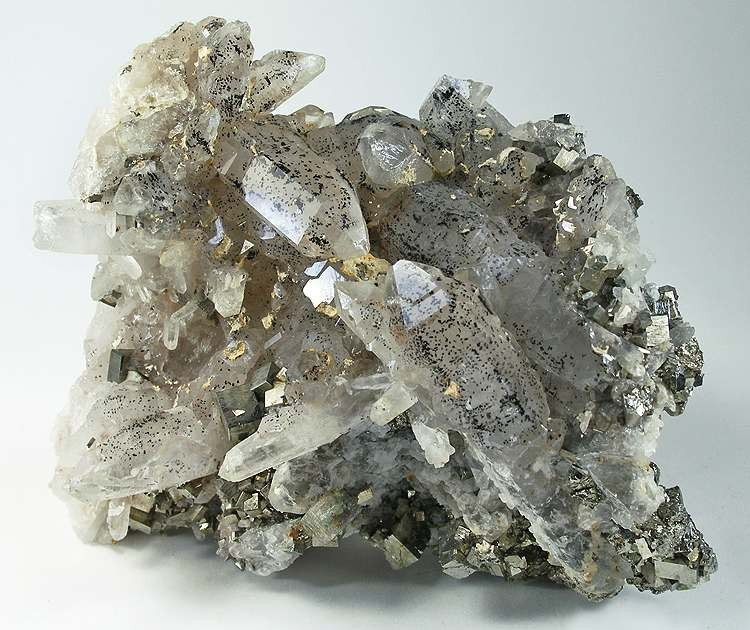

General
- Category: Sorosilicate
- Formula: Ca_{2}Mn^{2+}Fe^{3+}[Si_{4}O_{12}(OH)]·(H_{2}O)_{2}
- IMA symbol: Hub
- Crystal system: Triclinic
- Crystal class: Pinacoidal (1̅) (same H-M symbol)
- Space group: P1̅
- Unit cell: a = 9.96 Å, b = 13.875 Å c = 6.562 Å; α = 133.19° β = 101.5°, γ = 66.27°, Z = 2

Identification
- Color: Dark to pale brown
- Crystal habit: Aggregates of inter-grown crystals
- Cleavage: One good cleavage parallel to c-axis
- Fracture: Conchoidal fracture
- Tenacity: Brittle
- Mohs scale hardness: 5.5
- Luster: Vitreous
- Streak: Orange-brown
- Specific gravity: 3.02
- Optical properties: Biaxial (-) bire=0.0230
- Refractive index: n_{α}=1.667, n_{β}=1.679, n_{γ}=1.69
- Birefringence: 0.0230 (γ-α)
- Pleochroism: Yes
- 2V angle: 87(5)° and 89(2)°
- Ultraviolet fluorescence: None

The mineral hubeite, Ca_{2}Mn^{2+}Fe^{3+}[Si_{4}O_{12}(OH)]·(H_{2}O)_{2}, is a sorosilicate of the Si_{4}O_{13} group. Structurally it also belongs to the Akatoreite group. It was found and named after the province of Hubei, China. It is common to iron ores in a mine of that region. It occurs mainly as aggregates of fan like crystals. It is dark to pale brown, has orange-brown streak and is vitreous. Hubeite has a hardness of 5.5 in the Mohs scale, one good cleavage and conchoidal fracture. It is triclinic with a space group of P1*. The structure of hubeite is very uncommon, and in fact there is only one other mineral that fits the Si_{4}O_{13} group, which is ruizite.

== Background ==
Hubeite was discovered by Hawthorne et al. (2002) at the Daye mines in the Hubei province of China. It is classified as a sorosilicate, based on its formula (Hawthorn et al., 2004). Other related minerals would be inesite, (Hawthorne et al., 2004), ruizite (Hawthorne et al., 2002) and Akatoreite (Burns et al., 1993).

== Composition ==
To analyze the composition, an electron microprobe was used in the wavelength-dispersion mode (Hawthorn et al., 2002). The quantity of (OH) and (H_{2}O) was acquired by solid solution and refinement, based on previous work by Hawthorne et al., 1990. To assure the presence of (OH) and (H_{2}O) groups, an infrared spectrum was also recorded (Hawthorn et al., 2002).

== Physical and optical properties ==
Hubeite is most common as aggregates of intergrown crystals (Fig.1) that are usually less than 5 mm across and that have individual crystals with well-developed faces that are as long as 1 mm (Hawthorne et al., 2002). The color ranges from pale to dark brown, depending on the crystal size (Fig.2). Other properties consist of a pale orange-brown streak, vitreous luster, non-fluorescence, and one good cleavage parallel to the c-axis. It is also brittle with conchoidal fracture, has a hardness of 5.5 in the Mohs scale and a specific gravity of 3.02 (Hawthorn et al., 2002). As for optical features, hubeite is strongly pleochroic, biaxial with an indeterminate optic sign and has a birefringence of 0.023 (γ-α) (Hawthorne et al., 2002).

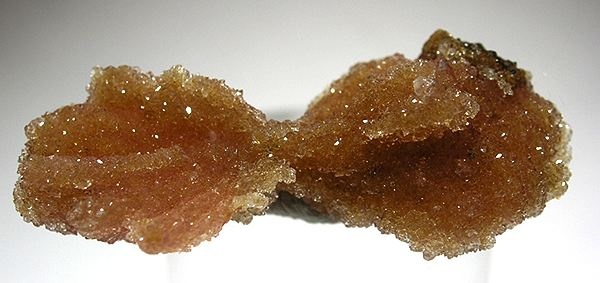
Fig 1- Bow-tie aggregate of hubeite crystals

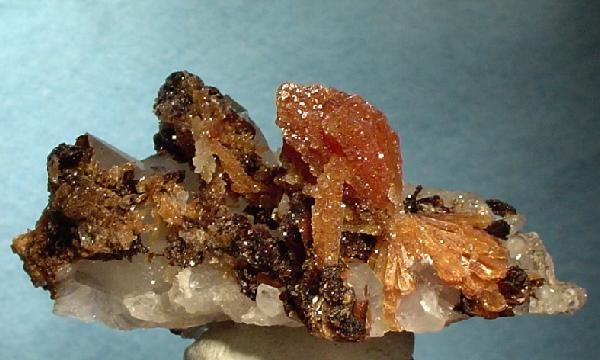
Fig 2 –Color representation of hubeite

== Structure ==
The crystals used for structure study were acquired at the Daye Mine (Hawthorne et al., 2004). To get a first general idea of the mineral structure it went through X-ray intensity data analysis and then, for a more detailed study, an electron microprobe was used (Hawthorne et al., 2004). Hubeite is triclinic (P1*). Basically, there are two Ca sites in the structure of hubeite, with site one being and octahedron and the second site is coordinated by 6 oxygen atoms at the same distance and one extra oxygen atom further out and arranged in an augmented octahedron (Hawthorne et al., 2004). There are also 4 sites for Si in tetrahedral arrangement, and the fourth site bonds to an OH group forming an acid-silicate group (SiO_{3}(OH)) (Hawthorne et al., 2004). There are 2 oxygen sites that connect 2 Si atoms, thus creating a sorosilicate (Hawthorne et al., 2002). [Si_{4}O_{13}] corresponds to a four membered chain fragment of tetrahedra according to Hawthorne et al. (2004). The only other sorosilicate mineral that has that same four membered configuration is ruizite (Moore et al., 1985). The main difference of the two minerals is the valence of Mn and the existence of Fe^{3+} for Hubeite (Hawthorne et al., 2002). Ruizite is of the [Si_{4}O_{13}] sorosilicate group (Hawthorne, 1984) and when it was discovered, it did not much any other Ca-Mn silicate already known (Willams et al., 1977), and now with the discovery of hubeite it is easier to understand the [Si_{4}O_{13}] sorosilicate group. The other two sites left in the hubeite structure are filled with Fe with CN=6 and Mn with CN=6, being one of the bonds to OH in the Mn case. The structure of hubeite is heteropolyhedra, with alternating layers of tetrahedra and different polyhedra parallel to (001) (Hawthorne et al., 2004). The tetrahedral layers are formed by [Si_{4}O_{13}] sharing corners, and the other alternating layer is formed by the [6], [7] and [8] Ca, Mn^{2+} and Fe^{3+} polyhedral sharing edges (Hawthorne et al., 2004). This last feature is what relates hubeite to the akatoreite group. Akatoreite, like hubeite, is triclinic with space group P1*(Burns et al., 1993). Akatoreite’ structure is layered as well with alternating sheets of octahedra and tetrahedra, parallel to (101) (Burns et al., 1993). The octahedra groups, as well as one Mn tetrahedra group, are sharing edges and linked by the corner sharing tetrahedral. The same happens in ruizite, except that they are linked by the [Si_{4}O_{13}] group. The inesite structure also relates very well to the hubeite structure. It is also based on layers of edge sharing polyhedra alternating with corner sharing tetrahedra (Hawthrone et al., 2004). The main difference is that inesite is a cyclosilicate, and in fact, by omitting 2 of the 6 tetrahedra that form the tetrahedra ring, and if the other 8 membered ring is broken and hydroxylated, the new arrangement becomes a hubeite (Hawthorne et al., 2004). This just confirms the association of hubeite and inesite in the Daye mines (Hawthorn et al., 2004).

== Geological occurrence ==
Hubeite is mainly associated to a skarn assemblage with pink inesite, colorless apophyllite, quartz, pyrite and colorless-white calcite (Hawthorne et al., 2004). They all occur together at the Daye Mine. Usually hubeite appears in two different situations. It may occur as isolated aggregates of crystals perched on white quartz, or it may occur covering both sides of thick specimens, that are usually pink inesite and apophyllite (Hawthorne et al., 2002). Figures 3 and 4 illustrate both situations.

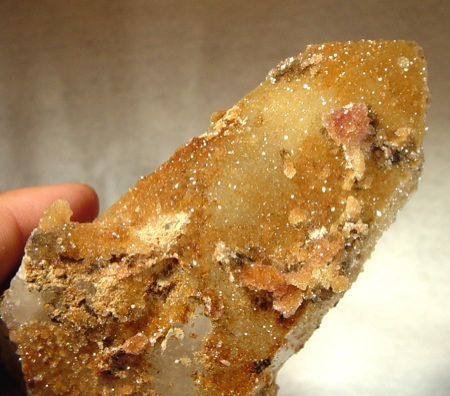
Fig 3 -Hubite occurrence on quartz

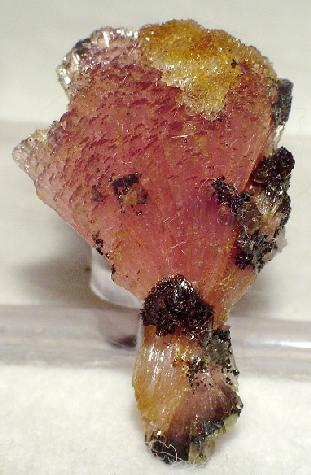
Fig 4 – Hubite occurrence on pink inesite

The localities where ruizite is found, associated with apophyllite, inesite and pyrite as well, and there is no hubeite, which leads the conclusion that hubeite needs oxidized environments and sufficient concentration of iron to occur. The Daye mine is an iron ore deposit (Dingyu et al., 1982). This specific area is characterized by deposits of late Paleozoic carbonate rocks in contact with plutons aging between the middle Jurassic to middle Cretaceous (Dingyu et al., 1982). According to Dingyu et al. (1982), the iron rich magma injections are the main cause for the formation of the ore deposits of the region. These polymetallic deposits form a belt that crosses China in the west–east direction (Ottens, 2007). Curiously, the mine where hubeite was first found is in fact a wollastonite source for minerals collectors.

== Locations ==
Hawthorne et al. (2002) discovered hubeite in the Daye mine, in the Hubei province of China. This mine became famous after that discovery and despite this specific breakthrough, the mine is most popular for its crystals of inesite and wollastonite (Ottens, 2007). It opened up in 1966 for copper exploration, but after the lack of profits, it became a major source for wollastonite (Ottens, 2007). Luckily, along the area of the Daye mine, there are other skarn-type iron and copper deposits that are big contributors to the overall reserves of copper and iron in China (Ottens, 2007). Daye County is also rich in non-metallic mineral deposits, but it is the metallic ores that make it special and it is an important city for the manufacture of bronze (Ottens, 2007). The Hubei province has gold and silver production as the main revenue source (Ottens, 2007). This province is also one of the birthplaces of the Chinese bronze-age culture, represented in the artwork of the Yangtze River culture (Ottens, 2007). The copper extraction began in this area is related to the Yin dynasty and the iron extraction began in the Qing dynasty, making these mines a “symbol” in the Chinese culture (Ottens, 2007).
