= Christmas, Arizona =

Ghost town in Gila County, Arizona

- Ghost town
- Location within Arizona
- Coordinates: 33°03′44″N 110°44′33″W
- Country: United States
- State: Arizona
- County: Gila
- Established: 1902

Area
  - Water: 0 sq mi (0.0 km^{2})
- Elevation: 2,674 ft (815 m)

Population (2010)
  - Ghost town: 0
  - Density: 0/sq mi (0/km^{2})
  - Metro: 0
- Time zone: UTC-7 (MST)
- GNIS feature ID: 2897

Christmas is an uninhabited mining community in Gila County, Arizona, United States. The mine which led to creation of the town was staked on Christmas Day 1902, prompting the name. During the three decades in which the town's post office operated it was a popular destination for holiday mail seeking a "Christmas" postmark. The mine is also the location where the minerals apachite, junitoite, and ruizite were first discovered.

It has frequently been noted on lists of unusual place names.

== History ==
Christmas traces its history to a pair of mining claims in the Dripping Spring Mountains. The first, filed in 1878, was made by Bill Tweed and Dennis O'Brien while the second, filed in 1882, was made by Dr. James Douglas. The claims were invalidated in 1884 when it was determined they were located within the boundaries of the San Carlos Apache Indian Reservation. Several years later prospector George B. Chittenden began petitioning the U.S. Congress to modify the reservation's boundaries. An executive order establishing new boundaries for the reservation, and removing the old mining claims from the reservation, was signed by President Teddy Roosevelt on December 22, 1902.

Chittenden arranged for a series of relay riders between the telegraph office in Casa Grande and his camp site just outside the reservation. News of the boundary change arrived late on Christmas Eve prompting Chittenden and his partner, N. H. Mellor, to immediately set out for the old claim sites. The pair staked their claim during the early morning hours and later stated, "We filled our stockings and named the place Christmas in honor of the day."

The Christmas mine produced 55 million pounds (25 kilotonnes) of copper, with a value in excess of US$10 million, and limited amounts of silver and gold between 1905 and 1943. Prior to the Panic of 1907, the Christmas mine was operated by the Saddle Mountain Mining Company. Two years after the panic, the mine was reopened by the Gila Copper Sulphide Company. During this time the town of Christmas sprang up near the mine. By 1919 the town boasted a meat market, general store, billiards hall, and two club houses, one for the Hispanic workers and the other for the Whites.

The mine fell into receivership in 1921 and was closed. It reopened four years later when the Miner Products Company established a concentration operation capable of processing 500 tons of copper ore per day. The town continued to grow and reached a peak population of roughly 1,000 by the early 1930s. Added amenities included a barbershop, dairy, hat shop, grocery store, school, and a church. Missing were common mining town features such as gambling halls, brothels, and saloons, the town residents tending to avoid both vice and lawlessness. A drop in copper prices however caused the population to shrink to about 100 people by the end of 1931.

The town's post office opened on June 17, 1905. Over the next three decades the post office opened and closed several times based upon the fortunes of the mine. It was also difficult keeping a postmaster for the facility as the postmaster's pay was based primarily on the office's stamp sales. During holidays the post office was considerably busier. Christmas cards and other packages were sent from across the United States by people wishing to have their items re-mailed with a Christmas postmark. With the town's declining population making operations unprofitable, the Christmas post office closed for a final time on March 30, 1935. Despite the closure, holiday mail continued to arrive for the next two decades; these bags of mail were forwarded to the nearby post office in Winkelman, Arizona.

The Christmas Copper company went bankrupt in 1932 and the mine was sold to a series of different owners before being purchased by the Inspiration Consolidated Copper Company in 1955. The United States Bureau of Mines and United States Geological Survey performed exploration diamond drilling at the mine during the 1940s. In December 1956, the Inspiration Consolidated Copper Company announced plans to sink a new 1,700 feet (520 m) mine shaft. During the 1960s the mine was converted into an open pit and a number of the town's buildings were either moved or bulldozed to make way for the mine's expanded foot print. Christmas' population was 180 in the 1960 census.

In addition to normal mining activities the site was the discovery location for several minerals, including apachite, junitoite, and ruizite. A slump in copper prices forced final closure of the mine in the early 1980s. The mine is now owned by Freeport Mcmoran and is closed to the public.
