= Carlos Ruiz Fuller =

Chilean geologist (1916–1997)

- Born: September 23, 1916; Valparaiso, Chile
- Died: March 28, 1997 (aged 80); Santiago, Chile
- Education: University of Chile
- Known for: First geological mapping of Chile's mineral deposits; Founding Institute of Geological Investigations
- Scientific career
- Fields: Geology

Carlos Enrique Ruiz Fuller (September 23, 1916 – March 28, 1997) was a Chilean geologist and mining engineer noted for his planning and direction of the Institute of Geological Investigations of Chile and his pioneering surveying and mapping of Chile's metal deposits in the 1960s. He was also the head of the geology sector of the Production Development Corporation (CORFO) and undersecretary at the Ministry of Mining of Chile between 1954 and 1957.

In the mid-1940s he led an economic geology study of the ores of the Chilean Iron Belt. He contributed to the establishment of the lime quarry in Guarello Island in 1949 when he in 1946 helped identify this remote marble (marble) area from aerial photographs.

The mineral carlosruizite was named after him in 1994.
