= Gregori Aminoff =

Swedish mineralogist and artist (1883–1947)

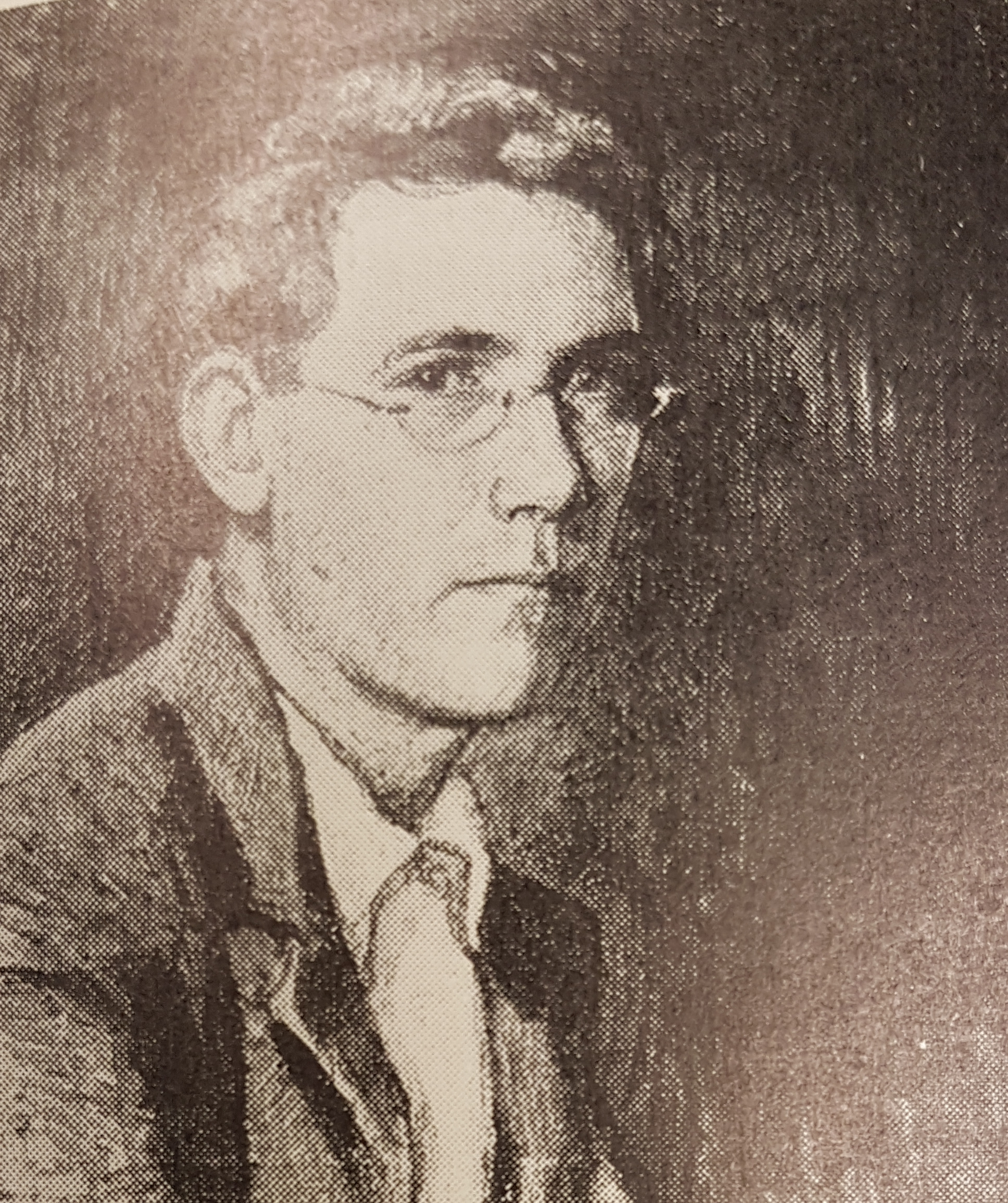
- Born: 8 February 1883; Stockholm, Sweden
- Died: 11 February 1947 (aged 64); Stockholm, Sweden
- Relatives: Emilia Broomé (mother-in-law)

Academic background
- Education: Stockholm University; Uppsala University

Gregori Aminoff (8 February 1883 – 11 February 1947) was a Swedish mineralogist, artist, and a member of the Aminoff family. During his career, Aminoff introduced X-ray diffraction and electron diffraction to the Swedish scientific community and was a pioneer in crystallography in Sweden.

== Education and career ==
Aminoff was born in Stockholm and studied mineralogy at Stockholm University and took exams at Uppsala University, where he received a bachelor's degree in 1905. He switched to art after graduation and studied art first at the Konstnärsförbundets skola in Stockholm until its closure in 1908 and later in Italy with Henri Matisse. He exhibited with De Unga in Stockholm in 1909, 1910 and 1911, was represented at the Autumn Salon (Salon d'Automne) in Paris in 1909, and in 1912 together with Arvid Nilsson (1881–1971) had the solo exhibition Salon Joel in Stockholm. He also participated in exhibitions at the Konstnärsförbundet (English: Artists' Association) and at the Royal Swedish Academy of Fine Arts' spring exhibitions. Aminoff liked to paint naked bodies in landscapes but also urban motifs, portraits and landscapes. He is represented with works at, among others, the National Museum in Stockholm.

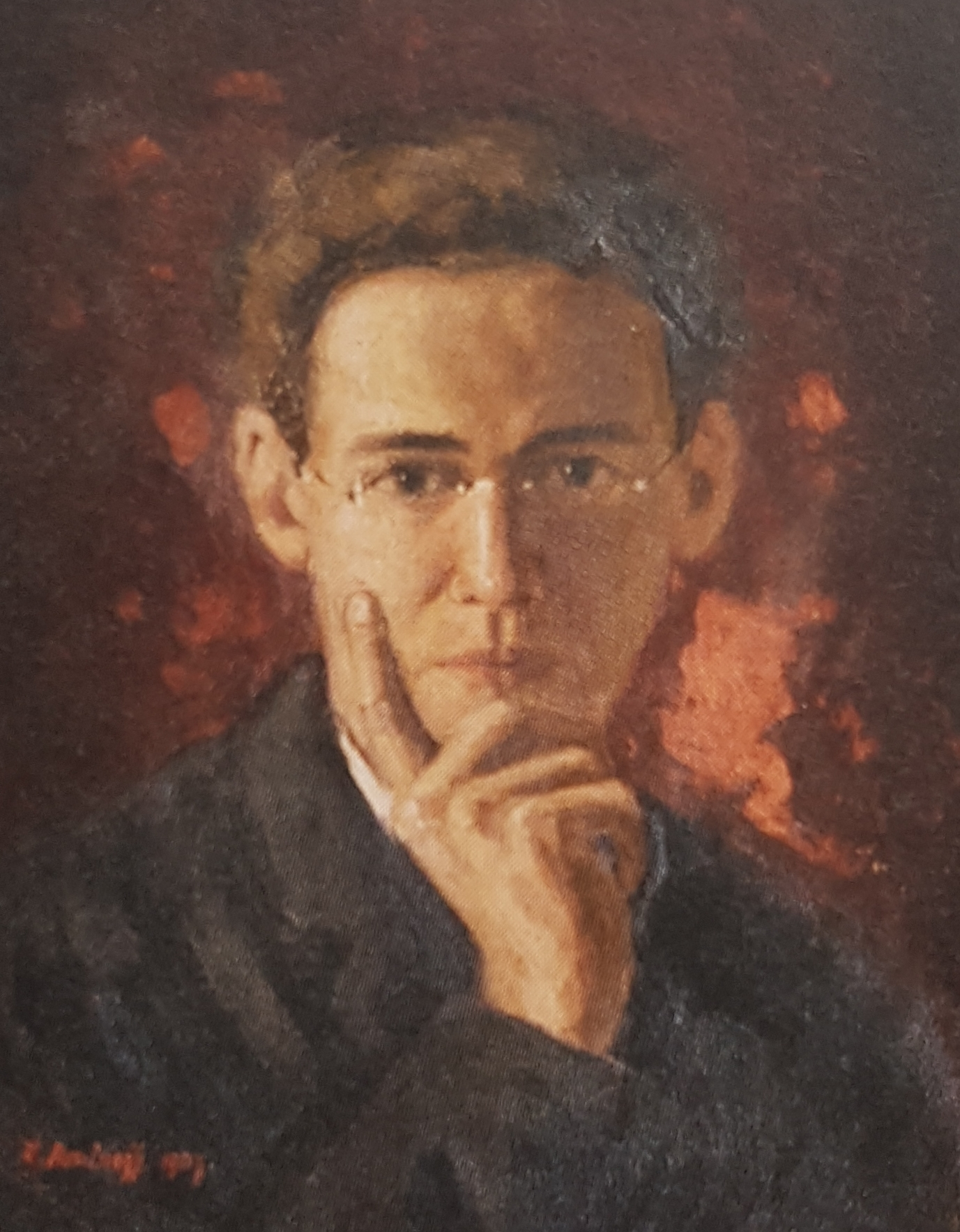
Self portrait of Gregori Aminoff (1907)

Aminoff supported himself through his art practices mostly through taking temporary jobs. In 1914, Aminoff stopped painting and resumed his studies of mineralogy and crystallography, which he had previously put aside. Through the great support from his first wife, Aminoff received a licentiate at Stockholm University in 1916. He later received his PhD in 1918 from Stockholm University and became a docent in mineralogy and crystallography. In the same year, Aminoff introduced X-ray crystallography in Sweden. In 1923, he became a professor at the Mineralogical Department of the Swedish Museum of Natural History. The diffraction techniques he brought to Sweden later attracted the interests from people such as Gösta Phragmén and Arne Westgren, whom Aminoff mentored. Aminoff was elected in 1933 as a member of the Royal Swedish Academy of Sciences. He was awarded the Björkén Prize in 1935 along with Arne Westgren. A mineral found by Aminoff in Långban's mine in Värmland has been named after him as aminoffite.

== Personal life ==
Aminoff was the son of captain Tönnes Aminoff in the Svea Life Guards and Mathilda Aminoff, née Lindström, who worked as a piano teacher. He was the nephew of Iwan T. Aminoff, the Swedish army officer and author. Aminoff married in 1908 a fellow student from Stockholm University, Ingrid Setterlund, daughter of head teacher Carl Setterlund. They had four daughters, Brita, Eva, Malin and Ulla. Aminoff was remarried to Birgit Broomé (1892–1950), daughter of Emilia Broomé and Erik Ludvig Broomé, in 1929. Aminoff published several papers in crystallography together with his second wife Broomé (later Broomé-Aminoff). Aminoff died of a heart disease in 1947. The Aminoffs were buried at the Norra burial place (Norra begravningsplatsen) outside Stockholm.

== Gregori Aminoff prize ==
Aminoff's widow, Birgit Broomé-Aminoff, established the Professor Gregori Aminoff memorial fund in her will in 1950. The fund is administered by the Royal Swedish Academy of Sciences and an annual prize, the Gregori Aminoff Prize, is awarded annually for published work in crystallography since 1979.
