= Carlosruizite =

Mineral

General
- Category: Sulfate mineral
- Formula: K_{6}(Na,K)_{4}Na_{6}Mg_{10} (SeO_{4})_{12}(IO_{3})_{12} ·12H_{2}O
- IMA symbol: Crz
- Strunz classification: 7.DG.40 (10 ed); 6/D.16-60 (8 ed)
- Dana classification: 23.1.2.2
- Crystal system: Trigonal
- Crystal class: Hexagonal scalenohedral (3̅m); H-M symbol: (3̅ 2/m)
- Space group: P3̅c1
- Unit cell: a = 9.59 Å, c = 27.56 Å; Z = 2; V = 2,195.11 Å^{3}

Identification
- Formula mass: 4,438.69 g/mol
- Color: Colorless to pale yellow
- Crystal habit: Platy – sheet forms (e.g. micas)
- Cleavage: {110} Good
- Tenacity: Brittle
- Mohs scale hardness: 2.5 – 3
- Luster: Vitreous
- Streak: White
- Diaphaneity: Transparent
- Specific gravity: 3.42
- Optical properties: Uniaxial (−)
- Refractive index: n_{ε}=1.642, n_{ω}=1.655
- Birefringence: δ = 0.013

Carlosruizite is a sulfate or selenate–iodate mineral with chemical formula: K_{6}(Na,K)_{4}Na_{6}Mg_{10}(SeO_{4})_{12}(IO_{3})_{12}·12H_{2}O. It has a low density (specific gravity of 3.36), colorless to pale yellow, transparent mineral which crystallizes in the trigonal crystal system. It forms a series with fuenzalidaite.

It was first discovered in 1994 in the locality of Zapiga, Tarapacá Region of Chile. Its name came from Carlos Ruiz Fuller (1916–1997), founder of the Institute of Geological Investigations.

It is found in samples of iquiqueite leached from caliche amarillo (yellow nitrate ore).

== Composition ==
Carlosruizite and fuenzalidaite are members of a solid solution series K_{6}(Na,K)_{4}Na_{6}Mg_{10}(XO_{4})_{12}(IO_{3})_{12}·12H_{2}O, for which the end-members have X = Se for the former and X = S for the latter. With the exception of selenium, the components of these minerals are widespread constituents of the Chilean nitrate ores. Se was not known to occur in these ores until it was discovered as a major component in carlosruizite by X-ray spectroscopy in the scanning electron microscope (SEM). Subsequent analyses of several specimens of nitrate ore from scattered localities in the Chilean nitrate fields showed them all to contain Se in amounts ranging from a few parts per million to nearly 50 ppm.

== Geologic occurrence ==
Small amounts (a few tens of milligrams each) of carlosruizite were first found in nitrate ore from two localities in the Chilean nitrate fields. Carlosruizite was found as ~200 μm platy crystals in samples of iquiqueite, Na_{4}K_{3}Mg(CrO_{4})B_{24}O_{39}(OH)·12H_{2}O, obtained by leaching caliche amarillo (yellow nitrate ore) from samples in the Iquique office of the former Servicio de Minas del Estado of Chile, now the National Geology and Mining Service (SERNAGEOMIN). The field locality of these samples is not precisely known but probably lies in the vicinity of Zapiga, where caliche amarillo is especially abundant. Of the 25 species of saline minerals that have been identified in the Chilean nitrate ores, 11 are known to be associated with carlosruizite. The dense caliche amarillo containing carlosruizite consists chiefly of a fine-grained mixture of nitratine, halite, and darapskite. The residues of leaching this material in cold water contain dietzeite [Ca_{2}(IO_{3})_{2}(CrO_{4})] briiggenire [Ca(IO_{3})_{2}·H_{2}O], tarapacaite (K_{2}CrO_{4}), lópezite (K_{2}Cr_{2}O_{7}), ulexite [NaCaB_{5}0_{6}(OH)_{6}·5H_{2}O], probertite [NaCaB_{5}O_{7}(OH)_{4}·3H_{2}O], and gypsum (CaSO_{4}·2H_{2}O).

== Atomic structure ==
Carlosruizite is a trigonal mineral with lattice spacing a = 9.59, c = 27.56 Å, Z = 1 and V = 2,195.11. It has a structure bearing a distant resemblance to those of the alunite group. These structures are rhombohedral or trigonal, with axial lengths of about 7 Å, and contain layers consisting of sheets of tetrahedral sulfate anions joined to an ^{[6]}Al (or ^{[6]}Fe) sheet, including OH groups, and the layers are separated by K (or Na) ions. Carlosruizite was, along with fuenzalidaite, the first minerals of this type in which a layer of IO_{3} groups occurred.

== Physical properties ==
Carlosruizite occurs as thin, colorless to pale yellow, transparent, euhedral, platy crystals with hexagonal outline, generally <200 μm in diameter and 20 μm thick. The crystals have a pseudorhombohedral habit, flattened on {0001} with beveled edges {1012}. They are slowly soluble in H_{2}O. Surfaces of some crystals show abundant round or elongate cavities, which probably were formerly filled with saline fluids. The crystals are brittle and break easily into multiple fragments. Hardness is on the order of 2–3. The luster is vitreous.

== Discovery and naming ==
George E. Ericksen discovered and named carlosruizite in 1994. It was named to honor the Chilean geologist and mining engineer Carlos Ruiz Fuller, who played a major role in the 20th century development of geology in Chile, by planning and directing the first national geological institution (inaugurated in 1957), the Instituto de Investigaciones Geológicas, now the Servicio Nacional de Geología y Minería, which began the first systematic geologic mapping and study of mineral deposits in Chile.
