= Gilalite =

Mineral

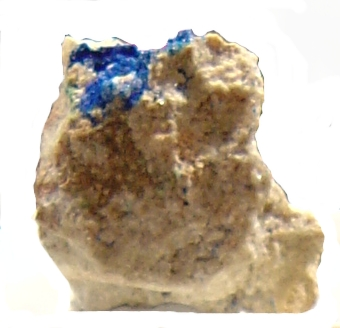
- Blue Gilalite crystals

General
- Category: Silicate mineral
- Formula: Cu_{5}Si_{6}O_{17}·7(H_{2}O)
- IMA symbol: Gil
- Strunz classification: 9.HE.05
- Crystal system: Monoclinic; Unknown space group
- Unit cell: a = 13.38, b = 19.16 c = 9.026 [Å]; β ≈ 90°; Z = 4

Identification
- Formula mass: 884.3 g/mol
- Color: Blue green, green
- Crystal habit: Raidiating fibrous in spherules
- Tenacity: Waxy or gummy
- Mohs scale hardness: 2
- Luster: Nonmetallic
- Streak: Light green
- Diaphaneity: Translucent
- Specific gravity: 2.72
- Optical properties: Biaxial (-)
- Refractive index: n_{α}= 1.560 n_{β}=1.635 n_{Ύ}= 1.635
- Birefringence: δ = 0.075

Gilalite is a copper silicate mineral with chemical composition of Cu_{5}Si_{6}O_{17}·7(H_{2}O).

It occurs as a retrograde metamorphic phase in a calc-silicate and sulfide skarn deposit. It occurs as fracture fillings and incrustations associated with diopside crystals. It is commonly found in the form of spherules of radial fibers.

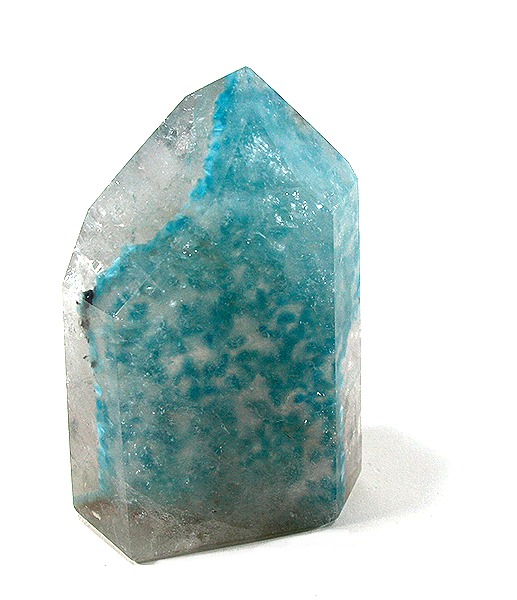
Gilalite inclusions within a quartz crystal from Juazeiro do Norte, Ceara State, Brazil (size: 7.1 x 4.7 x 2.7 cm)

It was first described for an occurrence in the Christmas porphyry copper mine in Gila County, Arizona in 1980 along with the mineral apachite. It derives its name from this locality. It has also been reported from the Goodsprings District, Clark County, Nevada; Juazeiro do Norte, Ceara State, Brazil and a slag area in Lavrion District, Attica, Greece.
