= Junitoite =

Sorosilicate mineral

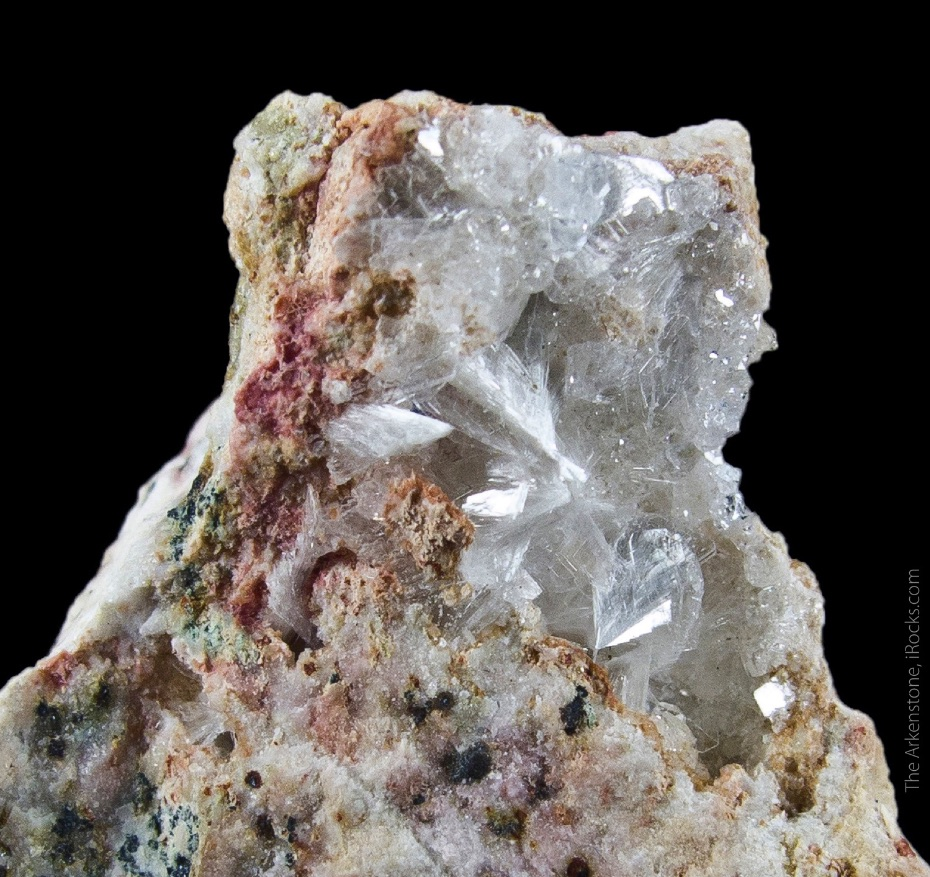
- Vitreous to pearly junitoite crystals to 4 mm from the Christmas Mine in Gila County, Arizona

General
- Category: Sorosilicate
- Formula: CaZn_{2}Si_{2}O_{7}·H_{2}O
- IMA symbol: Jit
- Strunz classification: 9.BD.15
- Dana classification: 56.2.1.1
- Crystal system: Orthorhombic
- Crystal class: Pyramidal (mm2); H-M group: (mm2)
- Space group: Ama2
- Unit cell: a = 12.510(7) b = 6.318(3) c = 8.561(6) [Å]; Z = 4

Identification
- Color: Colorless, milk-white, or colored due to alteration
- Cleavage: Good on {100}; poor on {010} and {011}
- Fracture: Micaceous
- Tenacity: Brittle to semi-sectile due to alteration
- Mohs scale hardness: 4.5
- Luster: Adamantine, Vitreous, Sub-Vitreous
- Streak: Colorless
- Diaphaneity: Transparent to translucent
- Optical properties: Biaxial (+)
- Refractive index: n_{α} = 1.656 n_{β} = 1.664 n_{γ} = 1.672
- Birefringence: δ = 0.016
- 2V angle: Measured: 86°, Calculated: 88°

Junitoite is a mineral with formula CaZn_{2}Si_{2}O_{7}·H_{2}O. It was discovered at the Christmas mine in Christmas, Arizona, and described in 1976. The mineral is named for mineral chemist Jun Ito (1926–1978).

== Description and occurrence ==
Junitoite is transparent to translucent and is colorless, milk-white, or colored due to alteration. Crystals grow up to 5 millimetres (0.20 in) and have high quality faces.

Junitoite occurs in fractures through pods of sphalerite. It formed by retrograde metamorphism and oxidation of tactite, also resulting in kinoite. The mineral is known from New Jersey and the type locality in Arizona. Junitoite occurs in association with apophyllite, calcite, kinoite, smectite, and xonotlite.

== Crystal structure ==
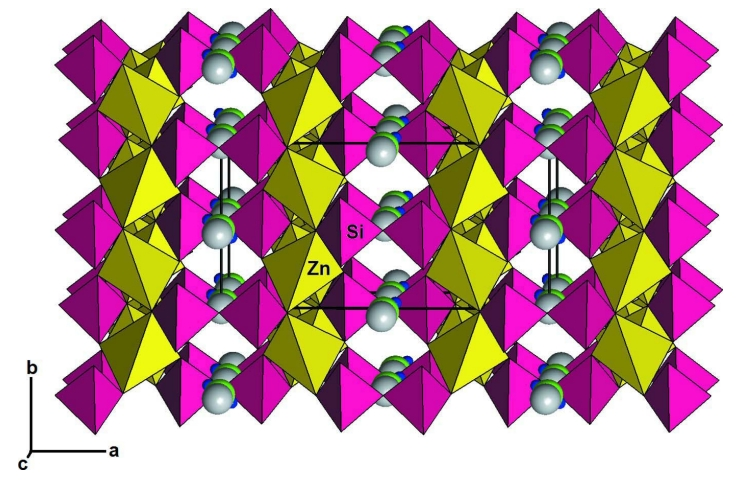
Crystal structure of junitoite. Gray – Ca, green – Ow5, blue – H, yellow – ZnO_{4}, purple – SiO_{4}

In 1968, Jun Ito published the results of synthesis of various lead calcium zinc silicates. The formula of one phase, designated X_{3}, was identified as probably CaZnSi_{2}O_{6}·H_{2}O. When he described junitoite, Sidney Williams identified the mineral's formula as CaZn_{2}Si_{2}O_{7}·H_{2}O, based on communications with Ito.

The mineral's crystal structure was first determined in 1985 and refined in 2012. The mineral crystallizes in the orthorhombic crystal system. The structure is formed by chains of corner-sharing ZnO_{4} tetrahedra linked together by Si_{2}O_{7} tetrahedral pairs. Calcium ions occupy vacancies and coordinate to five oxygen atoms and one water molecule.

== History ==
The first known specimen of junitoite was collected from the Christmas mine at Christmas, Arizona, and entered the collection of Joe Ana Ruiz. Geologist Robert A. Jenkins noticed the mineral in kinoite specimens, submitting Ruiz's sample to Sidney A. Williams for study. Further samples came from the collections of Ruiz and Raymond Diaz.

Williams identified the specimens as a new mineral and described it in the journal American Mineralogist in 1976. He named it junitoite in honor of Jun Ito, the mineral chemist who noted the compound of which the mineral is composed. The International Mineralogical Association approved the mineral as IMA 1975-042. The type material is housed in the University of Arizona, Harvard University, the National Museum of Natural History, the University of Paris, the National School of Mines, and The Natural History Museum.
