= Akatoreite =

Sorosilicate mineral

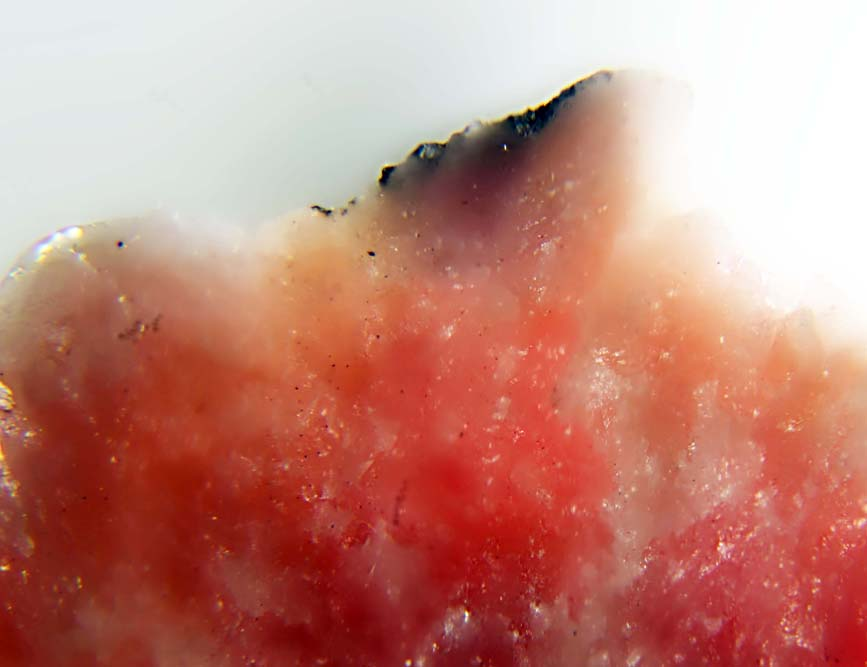
- Detail of akatoreite mineral in rhodonite matrix

General
- Category: Minerals
- Formula: ((Mn^{2+},Fe^{2+})_{9}Al_{2}[(OH)_{3}|HSi_{4}O_{13}])
- IMA symbol: Akt

Identification
- Color: Yellow-orange to orange-brown
- Mohs scale hardness: 6
- Luster: Vitreous
- Streak: yellowish white
- Diaphaneity: Transparent
- Specific gravity: 3.48

Akatoreite ((Mn^{2+}, Fe^{2+})_{9}Al_{2}[(OH)_{3}|HSi_{4}O_{13}]) is a mineral found in New Zealand.
