= Kinoite =

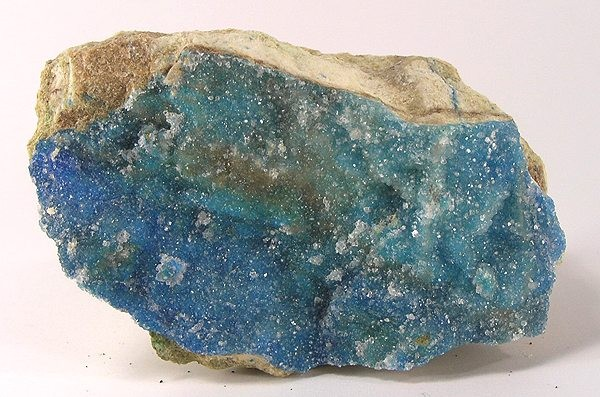

General
- Category: Sorosilicate
- Formula: Ca_{2}Cu_{2}Si_{3}O_{8}(OH)_{4}
- IMA symbol: Kin
- Strunz classification: 9.BH.10
- Crystal system: Monoclinic
- Crystal class: Prismatic (2/m) (same H-M symbol)
- Space group: P2_{1}/m
- Unit cell: a = 6.99, b = 12.88 c = 5.65 [Å]; β = 96.18°; Z = 2

Identification
- Formula mass: 450amu
- Color: Transparent deep blue
- Cleavage: excellent {010}, distinct {001} and {100}
- Mohs scale hardness: 2 1/2
- Luster: Vitreous
- Diaphaneity: Transparent
- Specific gravity: 3.13 – 3.19
- Density: 3.13 – 3.19
- Optical properties: Biaxial (−)
- Refractive index: n_{α} = 1.638 n_{β} = 1.665 n_{γ} = 1.676
- Birefringence: δ = 0.038
- Pleochroism: Strong
- 2V angle: Measured: 68°, calculated: 64°
- Dispersion: relatively weak

Kinoite (Ca_{2}Cu_{2}Si_{3}O_{8}(OH)_{4} or Ca_{2}Cu_{2}Si_{3}O_{10} · 2 H_{2}O) is a light blue copper silicate mineral. It is somewhat scarce. It has a monoclinic crystal system, vitreous luster, and is transparent to translucent. It can be found in the Santa Rita Mountains, the Christmas Mine at Christmas, Arizona and a few other copper mines. Kinoite is popular with mineral collectors. Kinoite was named upon its discovery in 1970 after the pioneer Jesuit missionary Padre Eusebio Kino who worked in Arizona, Sonora and Baja California.
