= Leonite =

Hydrated double sulfate of magnesium and potassium

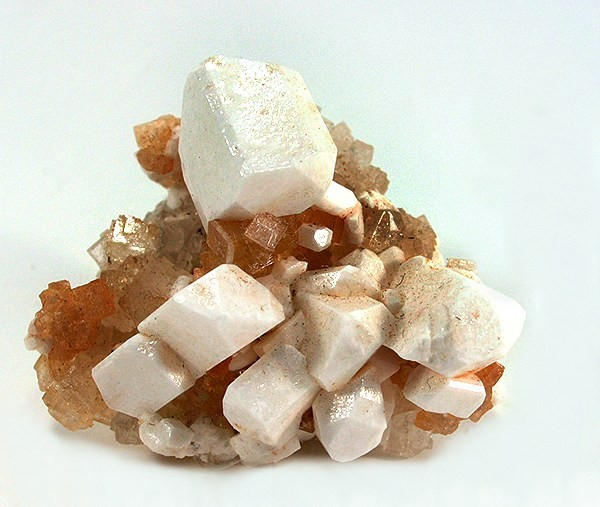
- Leonite

General
- Category: Sulfate mineral
- Formula: K_{2}Mg(SO_{4})_{2}·4H_{2}O
- IMA symbol: Leo
- Strunz classification: 7.CC.55
- Dana classification: 29.03.03.01
- Crystal system: Monoclinic
- Crystal class: Prismatic (2/m) (same H-M symbol)
- Space group: C2/m
- Unit cell: a = 11.78, b = 9.53 c = 9.88 [Å]; β = 95.4°; Z = 4

Identification
- Formula mass: 366.69 g/mol
- Color: White to colorless, yellow
- Crystal habit: Tabular crystals
- Twinning: {100}
- Cleavage: none
- Fracture: conchoidal
- Mohs scale hardness: 2.5–3
- Luster: Vitreous or waxy
- Streak: White
- Diaphaneity: Transparent to translucent
- Specific gravity: 2.201
- Optical properties: Biaxial (+)
- Refractive index: n_{α} = 1.479 n_{β} = 1.482 n_{γ} = 1.487
- Birefringence: δ = 0.008
- 2V angle: Measured: 90° Calc: 76°
- Dispersion: none
- Fusibility: easy
- Other characteristics: Leonit, 钾镁矾, Leonita, Леонит, Kalium-Astrakanit, Kalium-Blödit

Leonite is a hydrated double sulfate of magnesium and potassium. It has the formula K_{2}SO_{4}·MgSO_{4}·4H_{2}O. The mineral was named after Leo Strippelmann, who was director of the salt works at Westeregeln in Germany. The mineral is part of the blodite group of hydrated double sulfate minerals.

== Properties ==
Leonite has a bitter taste.

When leonite is analyzed for elements, it is usually contaminated with sodium and chloride ions, as it commonly occurs with sodium chloride.

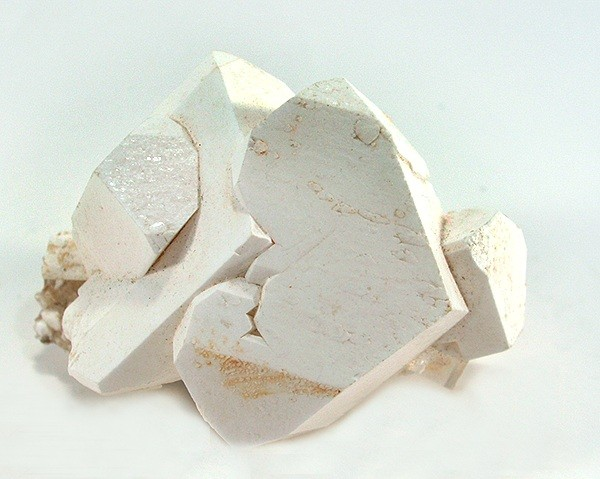
Leonite white pseudomorphs after picromerite crystals from Potash Mine, Roßleben, Querfurt, Saxony-Anhalt.

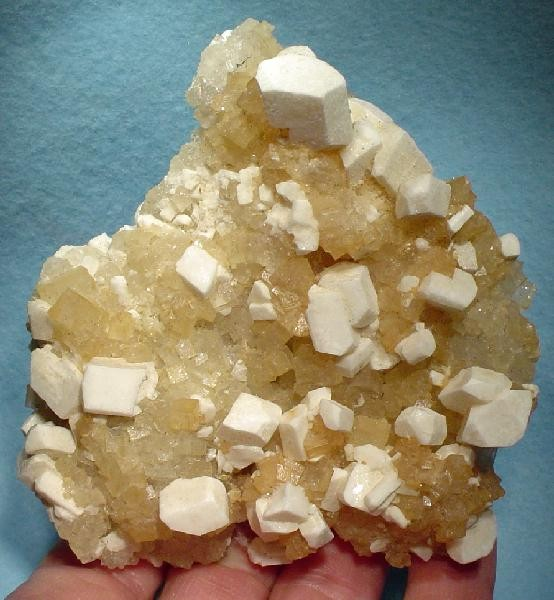
Leonite from Wintershall Potash Works, Heringen, Werra Valley, North Hesse.

=== Crystal structure ===
In the mineral family of leonite, the lattice contains sulfate tetrahedrons, a divalent element in an octahedral position surrounded by oxygen, and water and univalent metal (potassium) linking these other components together. One sulfate group is disordered at room temperature. The disordered sulfate becomes fixed in position as temperature is lowered. The crystal form also changes at lower temperatures, so two other crystalline forms of leonite exist at lower temperatures.

The divalent metal cation (magnesium) is embedded in oxygen octahedra, four from water around the equator, and two from sulfate ions at the opposite poles. In the crystal there are two different octahedral environments. Each of these octahedra are joined together by potassium ions and hydrogen bonds.

=== Phase changes ===
The sulfate occurs in layers parallel to the (001) surface. In the room temperature form, the sequence is ODODODODOD with O=ordered, and D=disordered. In the next form at lower temperatures, the disordered sulfate appears in two different orientations giving the sequence OAOBOAOBOAOBOAOB. At the lowest temperatures, the sequence simplifies to OAOAOAOAOAO.

The first phase transition happens at −4 °C. At 170 K (−103 °C), the crystals have space group I2/a, lattice parameters a = 11.780 Å, b = 9.486 Å, c = 19.730 Å, β = 95.23°, 8 formula per unit cell, and a cell volume of V = 2195.6 Å^{3}. The c dimension and unit cell volume are doubled due to the presence of four sulfate layers rather than two as in the other forms. The next phase change happens at −153 °C. At 100 K (−173 °C), the space group is P21/a, a = 11.778 Å, b = 9.469 Å, c = 9.851 Å, β = 95.26°, 4 formula per unit cell, and a cell volume of V = 1094.01 Å^{3}.

=== Temperature effects ===
As temperature increases, the cell volume gradually increases for the I2/a and C2/m phases; however, the a dimension decreases with increasing temperature. The change in a dimension is −11×10^{−6} K^{−1}. Birefringence drops as temperature rises. It varies from 0.0076 at −150 °C down to 0.0067 at 0 °C and 0.0061 at 100 °C. At the lower phase transition, birefringence steps down as the temperature drops; for the upper phase transition, it is continuous but not constant.

At the upper phase transition, −4 °C, latent heat is released, and the heat capacity changes. This transition has a fair bit of hysteresis. At the lower phase transition, heat capacity stays the same, but latent heat is released.

Leonite starts to lose water at 130 °C, but only really breaks down at 200 °C:

K_{2}Mg(SO_{4})_{2}·4H_{2}O(s) → K_{2}Mg(SO_{4})_{2}·2H_{2}O(s) + 2H_{2}O(g).

At even higher temperatures, langbeinite and arcanite (anhydrous potassium sulfate) and steam are all that remain:

2K_{2}Mg(SO_{4})_{2}·4H_{2}O(s) → K_{2}Mg_{2}(SO_{4})_{3}(s) + K_{2}SO_{4}(s) + 8H_{2}O(g).

=== Other physical properties ===
The logarithmic solubility product K_{sp} for leonite is −9.562 at 25 °C. The equilibrium constant log K at 25 °C is −3.979. The chemical potential of leonite is μ_{j}°/RT = −1403.97.

Thermodynamic properties include Δ_{f}G^{o}_{k} = −3480.79 kJ mol^{−1}; Δ_{f}H^{o}_{k} = −3942.55 kJ mol^{−1}; and ΔC^{o}_{p,k} = 191.32 J K^{−1} mol^{−1}.

The infrared spectrum of sulfate stretching modes shows peaks in absorption at 1005, 1080, 1102, 1134 and 1209 cm^{−1}. Sulfate bending mode causes a peak at 720, and lesser peaks at 750 and 840 cm^{−1}. An OH stretching mode absorbs at 3238 cm^{−1}. When temperatures reduce, the peaks move and/or narrow, and additional peaks may appear at phase transitions.

When leonite is stored for exhibition, it must not be in a place with too much humidity, otherwise it hydrates more.

== Formation ==
Starting in 1897, Jacobus Henricus van 't Hoff investigated how different salts were formed as sea water evaporated in different conditions. His purpose was to discover how salt deposits are formed. His research formed the basis for the studies of the conditions in which leonite is formed.

Leonite can form when a water solution of potassium sulfate and magnesium sulfate is concentrated between the temperature range of 320–350 K (47–77 °C). Above this temperature range, langbeinite (K_{2}Mg_{2}(SO_{4})_{3}) is formed. Below 320 K (47 °C), picromerite (K_{2}Mg(SO_{4})_{2}·6H_{2}O) crystallises. For solutions with more than 90% proportion MgSO_{4}, hexahydrite (MgSO_{4}·6H_{2}O) crystallises preferentially, and below 60%, arcanite (K_{2}SO_{4}) forms.

In mixtures of potassium chloride, potassium sulfate, magnesium chloride and magnesium sulfate at 35 °C in water, leonite can crystallise out in a certain composition range. The plot of the system forms boundaries of leonite with potassium chloride, potassium sulfate, and picromerite. As magnesium is enriched, a quadruple point with kainite exists.

In salt (NaCl) saturated brine, leonite can be deposited from magnesium and potassium sulfate mixtures as low as 25 °C. The 25 °C isotherm of the system has leonite surrounded by sylvine, picromerite, astrakanite, epsomite, and kainite. Sodium chloride saturated brines are formed by seawater evaporation, though seawater does not contain enough potassium to deposite leonite this way.

Leonite is precipitated in series solar ponds at the Great Salt Lake.

When picromerite is heated to between 85 and 128 °C, it gives off steam to give leonite:

K_{2}Mg(SO_{4})_{2}·6H_{2}O(s) → K_{2}Mg(SO_{4})_{2}·4H_{2}O(s) + 2H_{2}O(g).

== Reactions ==
When leonite is dissolved in nitric acid and then crystallised, an acid potassium magnesium double sulfate is formed: KHMg(SO_{4})_{2}·2H_{2}O.

Leonite heated with hydrated magnesium sulfate in an equimolar ratio at 350 °C produces langbeinite:

K_{2}Mg(SO_{4})_{2}·4H_{2}O(s) + MgSO_{4}·xH_{2}O(s) → K_{2}Mg_{2}(SO_{4})_{3}(s) + (4 + x)H_{2}O(g).

Potassium chloride solution can convert leonite to solid potassium sulfate:

2KCl(aq) + K_{2}Mg(SO_{4})_{2}·4H_{2}O(s) → 2K_{2}SO_{4}(s) + MgCl_{2}(aq).

More potassium sulfate can be precipitated by adding ethylene glycol.

Fluorosilicic acid in water reacts with leonite to produce insoluble potassium fluorosilicate and a solution of magnesium sulfate and sulfuric acid:

H_{2}SiF_{6}(aq) + K_{2}Mg(SO_{4})_{2}·4H_{2}O(s) → K_{2}SiF_{6}(s) + MgSO_{4}(aq) + H_{2}SO_{4}(aq).

Between 15 and 30 °C, a 22% magnesium chloride solution will react with leonite or picromerite to yield solid potassium chloride and hydrated magnesium sulfate.

== Natural occurrence ==
Leonite can form during the dehydration of seawater or lakewater. Leonite can be a minor primary constituent of evaporite potash deposits, or a secondary mineral. In order to form leonite from seawater, the brine must separate from the deposited solids so that reactions do not happen with earlier deposited salts, and the temperature must be around 32 °C. Below 25° or above 40°, the content of the brine will not be suitable to deposit leonite. At this temperature, blodite deposits first, and then leonite, constituting only 3.2% of the bittern salts.

Secondary reactions can produce or consume leonite in evaporite deposits. Leonite can convert to polyhalite, and kieserite can be changed to leonite, Groundwater penetrating bittern salt deposits can convert some to leonite, particularly in the cap regions of salt domes.

Leonite was first found in nature in the Stassfurt Potash deposit, Westeregeln, Egeln, Saxony-Anhalt, Germany. The Stassfurt salt deposits are from the Permian period. They are under the Magdeburg-Halberstadt region in central Germany. The leonite occurs in the salt clay and carnallite beds, which are up to 50 meters thick. Other locations in Germany are the Neuhof-Ellers Potash Works in Neuhof, Fulda, Hesse; the Riedel Potash Works in Riedel-Hänigsen, Celle, Lower Saxony; Aschersleben; Vienenburg; and Leopoldshall. Outside Germany, it is found at Vesuvius, Italy; Stebnyk, Ukraine; and the Carlsbad potash district, Eddy County, New Mexico, US. It is found in crystalline speleothems in Tăuşoare Cave in Romania; here it occurs with konyaite (K_{2}Mg(SO_{4})_{2}·5H_{2}O), syngenite (K_{2}Ca(SO_{4})_{2}·H_{2}O), thenardite (Na_{2}SO_{4}), and mirabilite (Na_{2}SO_{4}·10H_{2}O). Leonite also occurs in Wooltana Cave, Flinders Ranges, South Australia.

Soil in the Gusev Crater on Mars contains leonite as well as many other hydrated sulfates. On Europa, leonite is predicted to be stable, with a vapour pressure 10^{−13} that of ice. It is stable at pressures up to 10^{−7}, above which a more hydrated salt exists. It should form up to 2% of the salts near the surface.

Weathering of potassium-rich medieval glass forms a weathering crust that can contain leonite.

== Use ==
Leonite can be used directly as a fertilizer, contributing potassium and magnesium. It can be refined to K_{2}SO_{4} for fertilizer use. The process to convert leonite to potassium sulfate involves mixing it with a potassium chloride (a cheaper chemical) solution. The desired product, potassium sulfate, is less soluble and is filtered off. Magnesium chloride is very soluble in water. The filtrate is concentrated by evaporation, where more leonite crystallises, which is then recycled to the start of the process, adding more langbeinite or picromerite.

Leonite may have been used in an alchemical formula to make "potable gold" around 300 AD in China. This was likely to be a liquid colloid of gold.

== Related ==
Leonite is isotypic with the mineral mereiterite (K_{2}Fe(SO_{4})_{2}·4H_{2}O), and with artificial Mn-leonite (K_{2}Mn(SO_{4})_{2}·4H_{2}O). Others with the same crystal structure include:

K_{2}Cd(SO_{4})_{2}·4H_{2}O
(NH_{4})_{2}Mg(SO_{4})_{2}·4H_{2}O
(NH_{4})_{2}Mn(SO_{4})_{2}·4H_{2}O
(NH_{4})_{2}Fe(SO_{4})_{2}·4H_{2}O
(NH_{4})_{2}Co(SO_{4})_{2}·4H_{2}O and
K_{2}Mg(SeO_{4})_{2}·4H_{2}O.

Myron Stein suggested using the name "leonite" for element 96, naming it after the constellation Leo. This name was not accepted and curium was the name assigned.
