= Salt substitute =

Low-sodium table salt alternative

A salt substitute, also known as low-sodium salt, is an alternative to edible salt (table salt) marketed to reduce the risk of high blood pressure and cardiovascular disease associated with a high intake of sodium chloride while maintaining a similar taste.

Salt substitutes most often remove some amount of sodium chloride from the product and replace it with potassium chloride. Other formulations replace the sodium chloride with herbs, with magnesium sulfate or other substances.

== Low sodium diet ==
A low sodium diet is a diet that includes no more than 1,500 to 2,400 mg of sodium per day.

The human minimum requirement for sodium in the diet is about 500 mg per day, which is typically less than one-sixth as much as many diets "seasoned to taste". For certain people with salt-sensitive blood pressure or diseases such as Ménière's disease, this extra intake may cause a negative effect on health.

WHO guidelines state that adults should consume less than 2,000 mg of sodium/day (i.e. about 5 grams; 1/6 oz of traditional table salt), and at least 3,510 mg of potassium per day. In Europe, adults and children consume about twice as much sodium as recommended by experts.

== Research ==
A 2021 randomised controlled trial of 20,995 older people in China reported that use of a potassium salt substitute in home cooking over a five-year period reduced the risk of stroke by 14%, major cardiovascular events by 13% and all-cause mortality by 12% compared to use of regular table salt. The study reported no significant difference in hyperkalaemia between the two groups, though people with serious kidney disease were excluded from the trial. The salt substitute used was 25% potassium chloride and 75% sodium chloride.

A 2022 Cochrane review of 26 trials involving salt substitutes reported their use probably slightly reduces blood pressure, non-fatal stroke, non-fatal acute coronary syndrome and heart disease death in adults compared to use of regular table salt. A separate systematic review and meta-analysis published in the same year of 21 trials involving salt substitutes reported protective effects of salt substitute on total mortality, cardiovascular mortality and cardiovascular events.. The salt substitutes used in the trials captured by these reviews varied in composition.

A 2023 clinical trial engaged 1,612 residents of 48 residential care facilities in China. They were cluster-randomized via a 2 × 2 factorial design substituting 62.5% sodium chloride / 25% potassium chloride versus regular table salt and progressively restricted versus usual supply for two years. The salt substitute lowered systolic blood pressure (–7.1 mmHg, 95% confidence interval (CI) –10.5 to –3.8), meeting the primary endpoint, whereas restricted vs usual supply had no effect. It also lowered diastolic blood pressure (–1.9 mmHg, 95% CI –3.6 to –0.2) and resulted in fewer cardiovascular events (hazard ratio (HR) 0.60, 95% CI 0.38–0.96), but had no effect on total mortality.

In 2025, the WHO recommended that where people add salt to their food, they use a salt substitute that contains potassium. It said this recommendation applies to adults but not children, pregnant women or those with kidney issues.

== Types ==
=== Potassium ===
Potassium closely resembles the saltiness of sodium. In practice, potassium chloride (also known as potassium salt) is the most commonly used salt substitute. Its toxicity for a healthy person is approximately equal to that of table salt (the LD_{50} is about 2.5 g/kg, or approximately 190 g (6.7 oz) for a person weighing 75 kg (165 lb). Potassium lactate may also be used to reduce sodium levels in food products and is commonly used in meat and poultry products. The recommended daily allowance of potassium is higher than that for sodium, yet a typical person consumes less potassium than sodium in a given day. Potassium chloride has a bitter aftertaste when used in higher proportions, which consumers may find unpalatable. As a result, many formulations replace only some of the sodium chloride with potassium.

Various diseases and medications may decrease the body's excretion of potassium, thereby increasing the risk of potentially fatal hyperkalemia. People with kidney failure, heart failure, or diabetes are recommended to not use salt substitutes without medical advice.

=== Other ===
Sodium malate is salty in taste and may be blended with other salt substitutes. Although it contains sodium, the mass fraction is lower.

Monosodium glutamate is often used as a substitute for salt in processed and restaurant food, due to its salty taste and low sodium content compared to table salt, and can also be used effectively in home cooking.

Seaweed granules are also marketed as alternatives to salt.

Dehydrated, pulverized Salicornia (glasswort, marsh samphire) is sold under the brand name "Green Salt" as a salt substitute claimed to be as salty in taste as table salt, but with less sodium.

=== Historical ===
Historically (late 20th century), many substances containing magnesium and potassium have been tried as salt substitutes. They include:

- carnallite (KMgCl_{3}•6H_{2}O)
- kainite (KCl•MgSO_{4}•2H_{2}O)
- langbeinite (K_{2}Mg_{2}(SO_{4})_{2})
- sylvite (KCl) – currently used
- polyhalite (K_{2}MgCa_{2}(SO_{4})_{4}•2H_{2}O)
- epsomite (MgSO_{4}·7H_{2}O)
- kieserite (MgSO_{4}·H_{2}O)

Even further back in the early 20th century, lithium chloride was used as a salt substitute for those with hypertension. However, overdosing was common and deaths have occurred, leading to its prohibition in 1949.

== Additives ==
Flavor enhancers, although not true salt alternatives, help reduce the use of salt by enhancing the savory flavor (umami). Fish sauce has the same effect.

Salt substitutes can also be further enriched with the essential nutrients. A salt substitute can, analogously to the problem of iodine deficiency, help to eliminate the "hidden hunger" i.e. insufficient supply of necessary micronutrients such as iron. Such substances are promoted by UNICEF as a "super-salt".

== See also ==
- Sugar substitute
- Milk substitute
- Egg substitutes
