= Potassium magnesium sulfate =

Potassium magnesium sulfate is a double salt that can crystallise in a number of forms that occur as minerals.

- Langbeinite K_{2}Mg_{2}(SO_{4})_{3}
- Leonite K_{2}Mg(SO_{4})_{2}·4H_{2}O
- Picromerite K_{2}Mg(SO_{4})_{2}·6H_{2}O
