= Potassium sulfate =

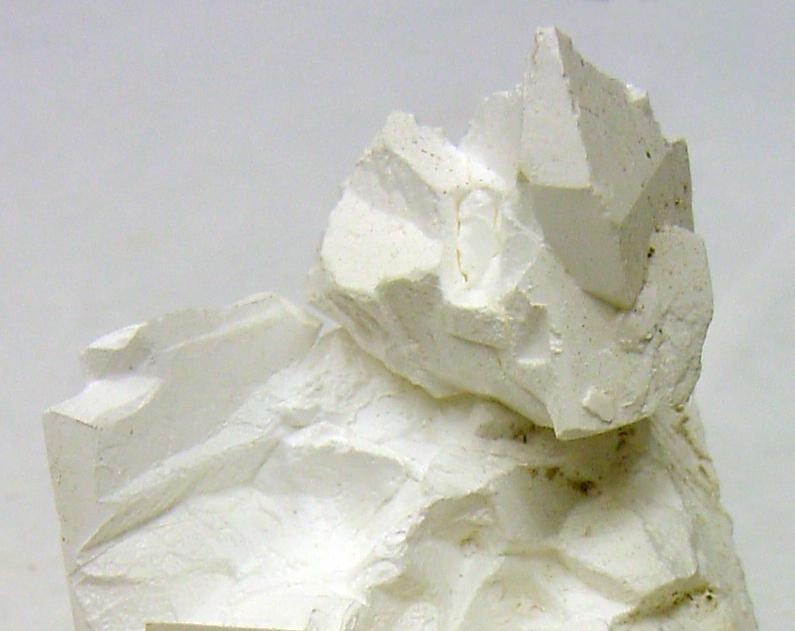
- Arcanite Arcanite

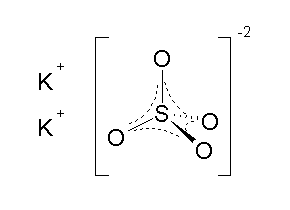
- Potassium sulfate

Names
- Other names Potassium sulphate

Identifiers
CAS Number	7778-80-5
3D model (JSmol)	Interactive image
ChEBI	CHEBI:32036
ChEMBL	ChEMBL2021424
ChemSpider	22915
ECHA InfoCard	100.029.013
EC Number	231-915-5
E number	E515(i) (acidity regulators, ...)
KEGG	D01726
PubChem CID	24507
RTECS number	TT5900000
UNII	1K573LC5TV
CompTox Dashboard (EPA)	DTXSID6029701
- InChI: InChI=1S/2K.H2O4S/c;;1-5(2,3)4/h;;(H2,1,2,3,4)/q2*+1;/p-2 Key: OTYBMLCTZGSZBG-UHFFFAOYSA-L; InChI=1/2K.H2O4S/c;;1-5(2,3)4/h;;(H2,1,2,3,4)/q2*+1;/p-2 Key: OTYBMLCTZGSZBG-NUQVWONBAU
- SMILES: [K+].[K+].[O-]S([O-])(=O)=O

Properties
Chemical formula	K_{2}SO_{4}
Molar mass	174.25 g·mol^{−1}
Appearance	White solid
Odor	odorless
Density	2.66 g/cm^{3}
Melting point	1,069 °C (1,956 °F; 1,342 K)
Boiling point	1,689 °C (3,072 °F; 1,962 K)
Solubility in water	11.1 g/100mL (20 °C (68 °F)); 12.0 g/100mL (25 °C (77 °F)); 24.0 g/100mL (100 °C (212 °F))
Solubility product (K_{sp})	1.32 (120 g/L)
Solubility in glycerol	slightly soluble
Magnetic susceptibility (χ)	−67.0×10^{−6} cm^{3}/mol
Refractive index (n_{D})	1.495

Structure
Crystal structure	orthorhombic

Hazards
- Occupational safety and health (OHS/OSH)
Main hazards	Irritant
- GHS labelling
Pictograms	(GHS07: Exclamation mark)
Signal word	Warning
Hazard statements	H318
Precautionary statements	P280, P305+P351+P338, P310
- Lethal dose or concentration (LD, LC)
LD_{50} (median dose)	6600 mg/kg (oral, rat)
Safety data sheet (SDS)	External MSDS

Related compounds
Other anions	Potassium hydrogen sulfate; Potassium sulfite; Potassium bisulfite; Potassium persulfate; Potassium selenate; Potassium tellurate
Other cations	Lithium sulfate; Sodium sulfate; Rubidium sulfate; Caesium sulfate
- Except where otherwise noted, data are given for materials in their standard state (at 25 °C [77 °F], 100 kPa). verify (what is ?) Infobox references

Potassium sulfate (US) or potassium sulphate (UK), also called sulphate of potash (SOP), arcanite, or archaically potash of sulfur, is the inorganic compound with formula K_{2}SO_{4}, a white water-soluble solid. It is commonly used in fertilizers, providing both potassium and sulfur.

== History ==
Potassium sulfate (K_{2}SO_{4}) has been known since early in the 14th century. It was studied by Glauber, Boyle, and Tachenius. In the 17th century, it was named arcanuni or sal duplicatum, as it was a combination of an acid salt with an alkaline salt. It was also known as vitriolic tartar and Glaser's salt or sal polychrestum Glaseri after the pharmaceutical chemist Christopher Glaser who prepared it and used medicinally.

Known as arcanum duplicatum ("double secret") or panacea duplicata in pre-modern medicine, it was prepared from the residue (caput mortuum) left over from the production of nitric acid (aqua fortis, HNO_{3}) from potassium nitrate (nitre, KNO_{3}) and sulfuric acid (oil of vitriol, H_{2}SO_{4}) via Glauber's process:

2 KNO_{3} + H_{2}SO_{4} → 2 HNO_{3} + K_{2}SO_{4}

The residue was dissolved in hot water, filtered, and evaporated to a cuticle. It was then left to crystallise. It was used as a diuretic and sudorific.

According to Chambers's Cyclopedia, the recipe was purchased for five hundred thalers by Charles Frederick, Duke of Holstein-Gottorp. Schroder, the duke's physician, wrote wonders of its great uses in cases of hypochondria cases, continued and intermitting fevers, stones, scurvy, and more.

== Natural resources ==
The mineral form of potassium sulfate, arcanite, is relatively rare. Natural resources of potassium sulfate are minerals abundant in the Stassfurt salt. These are cocrystallizations of potassium sulfate and sulfates of magnesium, calcium, and sodium.

Relevant minerals are:

- Kainite, KMg(SO_{4})·Cl·3H_{2}O
- Schönite (now known as picromerite), K_{2}SO_{4}·MgSO_{4}·6H_{2}O
- Leonite, K_{2}SO_{4}·MgSO_{4}·4H_{2}O
- Langbeinite, K_{2}Mg_{2}(SO_{4})_{3}
- Aphthitalite (previously known as glaserite), K_{3}Na(SO_{4})_{2}
- Polyhalite, 2SO_{4}·MgSO_{4}·2CaSO_{4}·2H_{2}O

The potassium sulfate can be separated from some of these minerals, like kainite, because the corresponding salt is less soluble in water.

Kieserite, MgSO_{4}·H_{2}O, can be combined with a solution of potassium chloride to produce potassium sulfate.

== Production ==
Approximately 1.5 million tons were produced in 1985, typically by the reaction of potassium chloride with sulfuric acid, analogous to the Mannheim process for producing sodium sulfate. The process involves intermediate formation of potassium bisulfate, an exothermic reaction that occurs at room temperature:

KCl + H_{2}SO_{4} → HCl + KHSO_{4}

The second step of the process is endothermic, requiring energy input:

KCl + KHSO_{4} → HCl + K_{2}SO_{4}

== Structure and properties ==
Two crystalline forms are known. Orthorhombic β−K_{2}SO_{4} is the common form, but it converts to α−K_{2}SO_{4} above 583 °C (1,081 °F). These structures are complex, although the sulfate adopts the typical tetrahedral geometry.

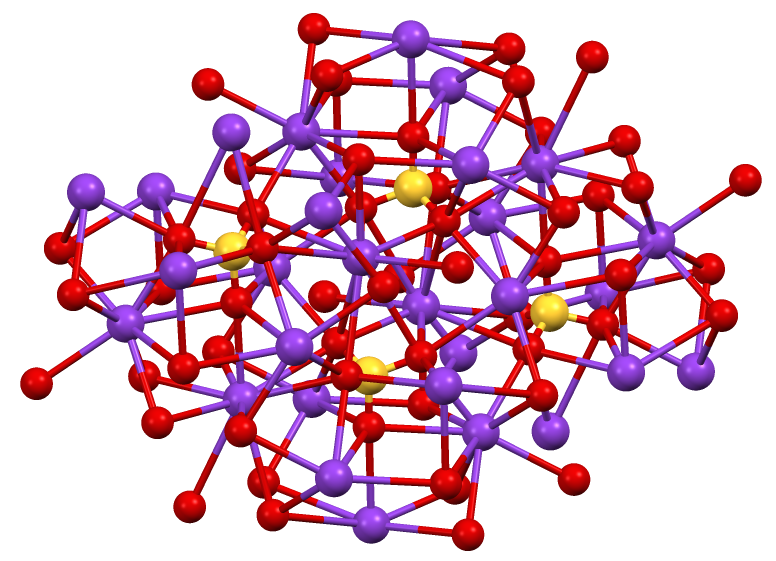
Structure of β−K_{2}SO_{4}.

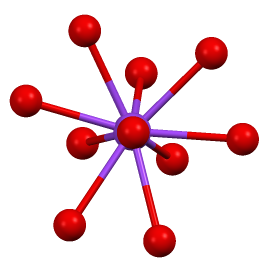
Coordination sphere of one of two types of K^{+} site.

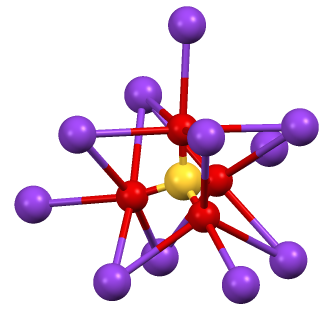
SO4 environment in β−K_{2}SO_{4}.

It does not form a hydrate, unlike sodium sulfate. The salt crystallizes as double six-sided pyramids, classified as rhombic. They are transparent, very hard and have a bitter, salty taste. The salt is soluble in water, but insoluble in solutions of potassium hydroxide (sp. gr. 1.35), or in absolute ethanol.

== Uses ==
The dominant use of potassium sulfate is as a fertilizer. K_{2}SO_{4} does not contain chloride, which can be harmful to some crops. Potassium sulfate is preferred for these crops, which include tobacco and some fruits and vegetables. Crops that are less sensitive may still require potassium sulfate for optimal growth if the soil accumulates chloride from irrigation water.

The crude salt is also used occasionally in the manufacture of glass. Potassium sulfate is also used as a flash reducer in artillery propellant charges. It reduces muzzle flash, flareback and blast overpressure.

It is sometimes used as an alternative blast media similar to soda in soda blasting as it is harder and similarly water-soluble.

A 5% solution of potassium sulfate was used in the beginning of the 20th century as a topical mosquito repellent.

== Reactions ==
=== Acidification ===
Potassium hydrogen sulfate (also known as potassium bisulfate), KHSO_{4}, is readily produced by reacting K_{2}SO_{4} with sulfuric acid. It forms rhombic pyramids, which melt at 197 °C (387 °F). It dissolves in three parts of water at 0 °C (32 °F). The solution behaves much as if its two congeners, K_{2}SO_{4} and H_{2}SO_{4}, were present side by side of each other uncombined; an excess of ethanol the precipitates normal sulfate (with little bisulfate) with excess acid remaining.

The behavior of the fused dry salt is similar when heated to several hundred degrees; it acts on silicates, titanates, etc., the same way as sulfuric acid that is heated beyond its natural boiling point does. Hence it is frequently used in analytical chemistry as a disintegrating agent. For information about other salts that contain sulfate, see sulfate.
