= Aphthitalite =

Potassium sulfate mineral

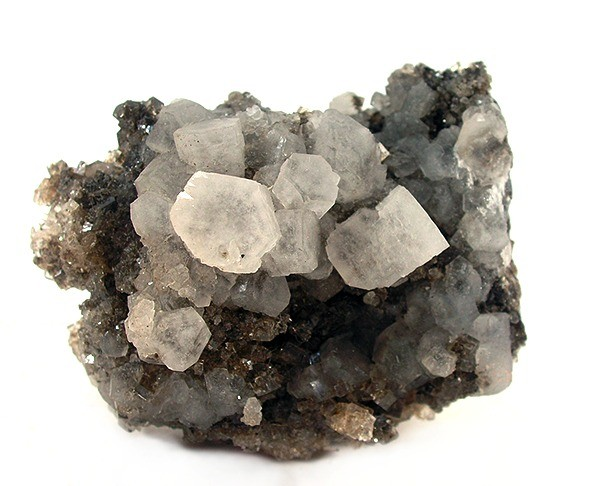
- Aphthitalite, collected from Ghom Salt Dome, Qom Province, Iran

General
- Category: Sulfate mineral
- Formula: (K,Na)_{3}Na(SO_{4})_{2}
- IMA symbol: Att
- Strunz classification: 7.AC.35
- Crystal system: Trigonal
- Crystal class: Hexagonal scalenohedral (3̅m); H-M symbol: (3̅ 2/m)
- Space group: P3̅m1 (no. 164)
- Unit cell: a = 5.67, c = 7.33 [Å]; Z = 1

Identification
- Color: White, colorless; gray, blue, green due to inclusions and impurities
- Crystal habit: Tabular crystals (with distorted pseudo-orthorhombic habit); as bladed aggregates and in crusts
- Twinning: On {0001} or repeated on {112̅0}
- Cleavage: Fair on {101̅0}, poor on {0001}
- Fracture: Conchoidal to uneven
- Tenacity: Brittle
- Mohs scale hardness: 3
- Luster: Vitreous to resinous
- Diaphaneity: Transparent to opaque
- Specific gravity: 2.66–2.71
- Optical properties: Uniaxial (+) (anomalously biaxial)
- Refractive index: n_{ω} = 1.487 - 1.491 n_{ε} = 1.492 - 1.499
- Birefringence: δ = 0.005
- Solubility: In water

Aphthitalite is a potassium sulfate mineral with the chemical formula: (K,Na)_{3}Na(SO_{4})_{2}.

It was first described in 1835 for an occurrence on Mount Vesuvius, Italy. The name is from the Ancient Greek ἄφθιτος, "unalterable", and ἅλς, "salt", for its stability in air. It occurs as fumarolic incrustations in volcanic environments, as small crystals and masses in evaporite deposits and in guano deposits. It occurs associated with thenardite, jarosite, sylvite and hematite in fumaroles; with blödite, syngenite, mirabilite, picromerite, borax and halite in evaporites; and with syngenite, whitlockite, monetite, niter and gypsum in guano deposits.
