= Syngenite =

Uncommon potassium calcium sulfate mineral

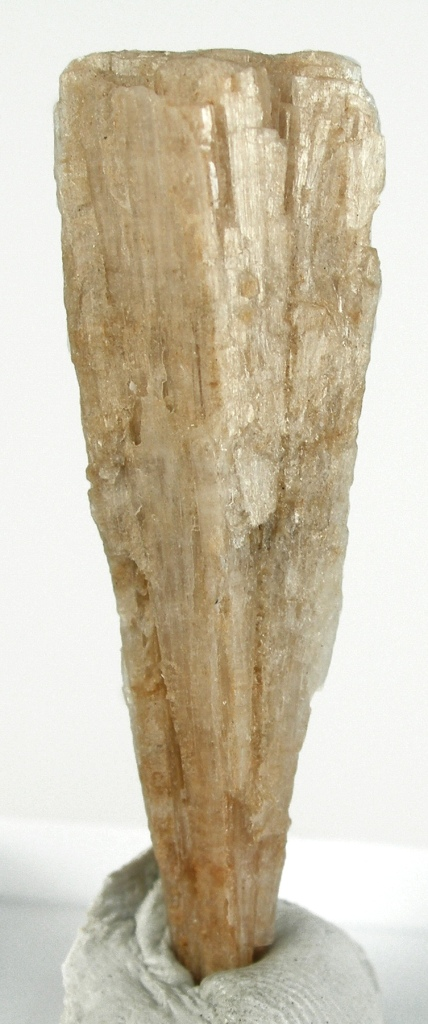
- Tapering crystal of syngenite (size: 4.4 × 1.3 × 0.6 cm)

General
- Category: Sulfate mineral
- Formula: K_{2}Ca(SO_{4})_{2}·H_{2}O
- IMA symbol: Sgn
- Strunz classification: 7.CD.35
- Dana classification: 29.3.1.1
- Crystal system: Monoclinic
- Crystal class: Prismatic (2/m) (same H-M symbol)
- Space group: P2_{1}/m
- Unit cell: a = 9.77 Å, b = 7.14 Å c = 6.25 Å; β = 104.01°; Z = 2

Identification
- Color: Colorless, milky white to faintly yellow due to inclusions
- Crystal habit: Tabular to prismatic crystals, lamellar aggregates and crystalline crusts
- Twinning: Common on {101} contact twins
- Cleavage: Perfect on {110} and {100}, distinct on {010}
- Fracture: Conchoidal
- Tenacity: Brittle
- Mohs scale hardness: 2.5
- Luster: Vitreous
- Streak: White
- Diaphaneity: Transparent to translucent
- Specific gravity: 2.579–2.603
- Optical properties: Biaxial (−), colorless (transmitted light)
- Refractive index: n_{α} = 1.501 n_{β} = 1.517 n_{γ} = 1.518
- Birefringence: δ = 0.017
- 2V angle: Measured: 28°
- Solubility: Partially dissolves in water

Syngenite is an uncommon potassium calcium sulfate mineral with formula K_{2}Ca(SO_{4})_{2}·H_{2}O. It forms as prismatic monoclinic crystals and as encrustations.

== Discovery and occurrence ==
It was first described in 1872 for an occurrence as druse on halite in the Kalusa Salt deposit, Ivanovo-Frankovsk Oblast', Ukraine. The name is from Greek 'συγγενής' (related) due to its chemical similarity to polyhalite.

It occurs in marine evaporite deposits as a diagenetic phase. It also forms as a volcanic sublimate, as vein fillings in geothermal fields and in caves where it is derived from bat guano. It occurs in association with halite and arcanite in salt deposits; and with biphosphammite, aphthitalite, monetite, whitlockite, uricite, brushite and gypsum in cave environments.

It is also found in hardened cement which has relatively higher amount of potassium.

== Production ==
Syngenite can be artificially produced by the action of a potassium sulfate solution on gypsum.

== Bibliography ==
- Palache, P.; Berman H.; Frondel, C. (1960). "Dana's System of Mineralogy, Volume II: Halides, Nitrates, Borates, Carbonates, Sulfates, Phosphates, Arsenates, Tungstates, Molybdates, Etc. (Seventh Edition)" John Wiley and Sons, Inc., New York, pp. 442-444.
