= Neutscher Höhe =

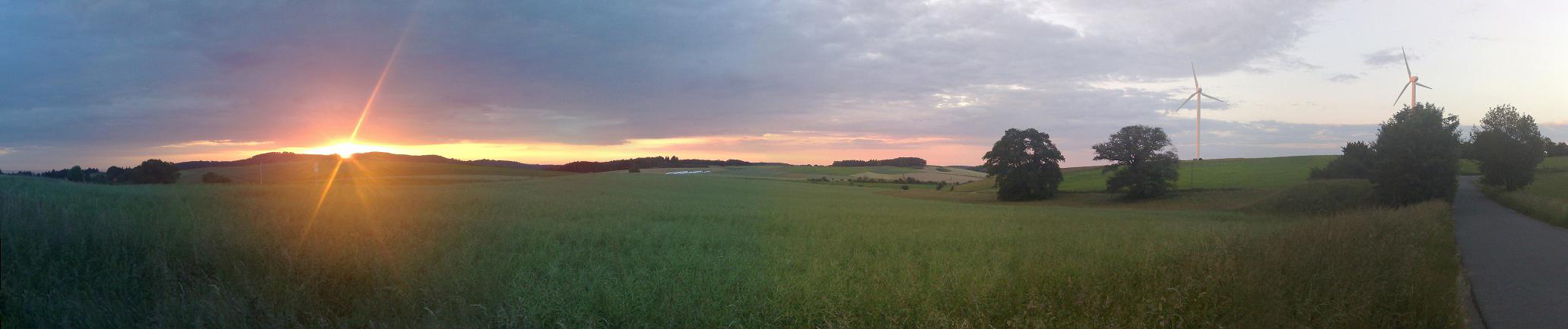
- Interactive map of Neutscher Höhe
- Elevation: 360 metres (1,180 ft)

Third Approach
- Location: Darmstadt-Dieburg, Hesse, Germany
- Range: Odenwald
- Coordinates: 49.770472°N 8.69983°E

Neutscher Höhe is a mountain pass of the Odenwald, in the district of Darmstadt-Dieburg, Hesse, Germany.

== Wind farm ==
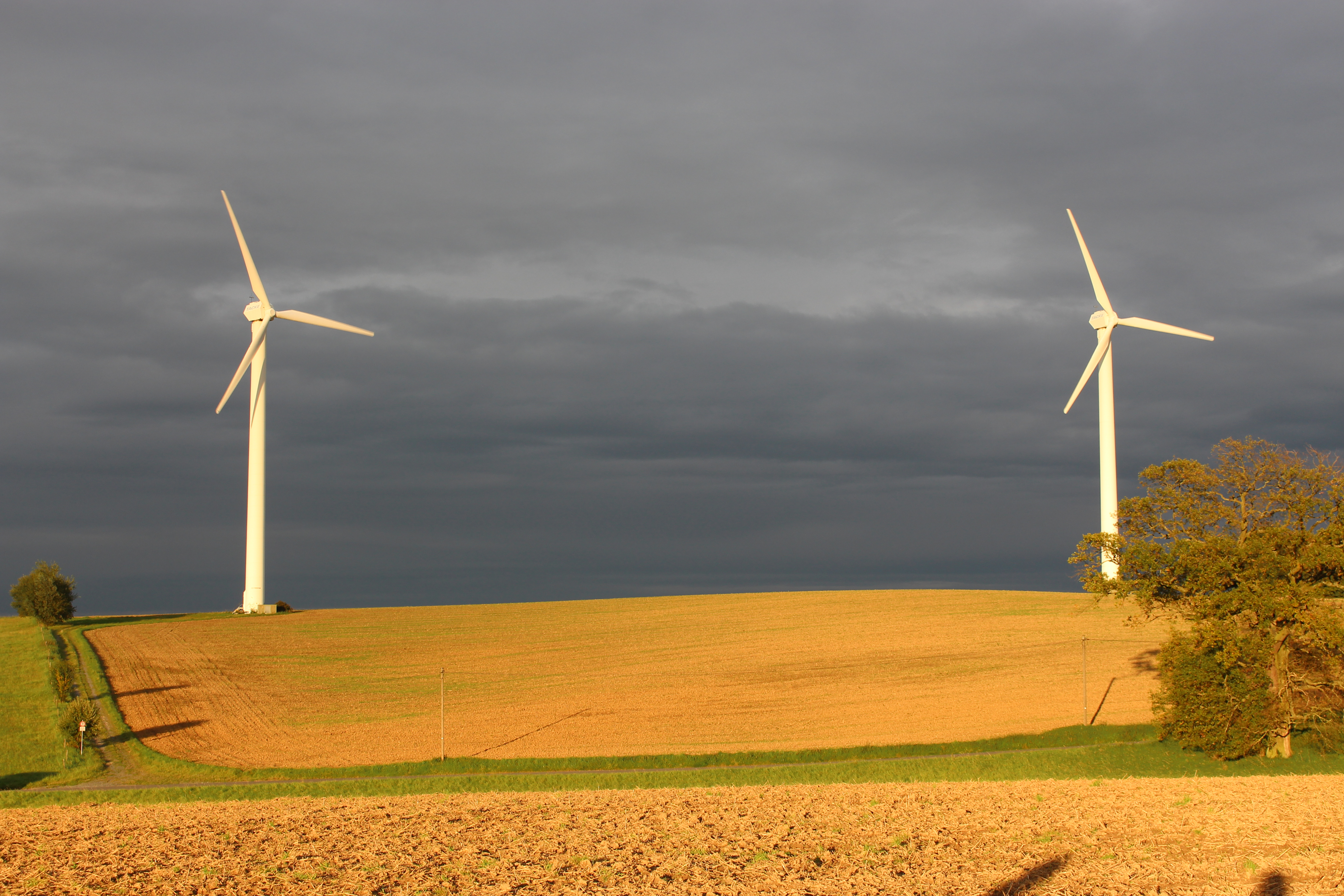
Two of the Neutscher Höhe wind turbines at sunset

On the hills nearby the pass is a wind farm with five wind turbines. Three turbines are of the type Tacke TW 600 and were launched in October 1994 by the Odenwaldwind GmbH. It was the first wind park in the southern German area. In 2011 two more powerful wind turbines, type REpower MM92, were built. One is operated by the Energiegenossenschaft Starkenburg eG.
