= Sylvinite =

Sedimentary rock made of a mechanical mixture of sylvite and halite

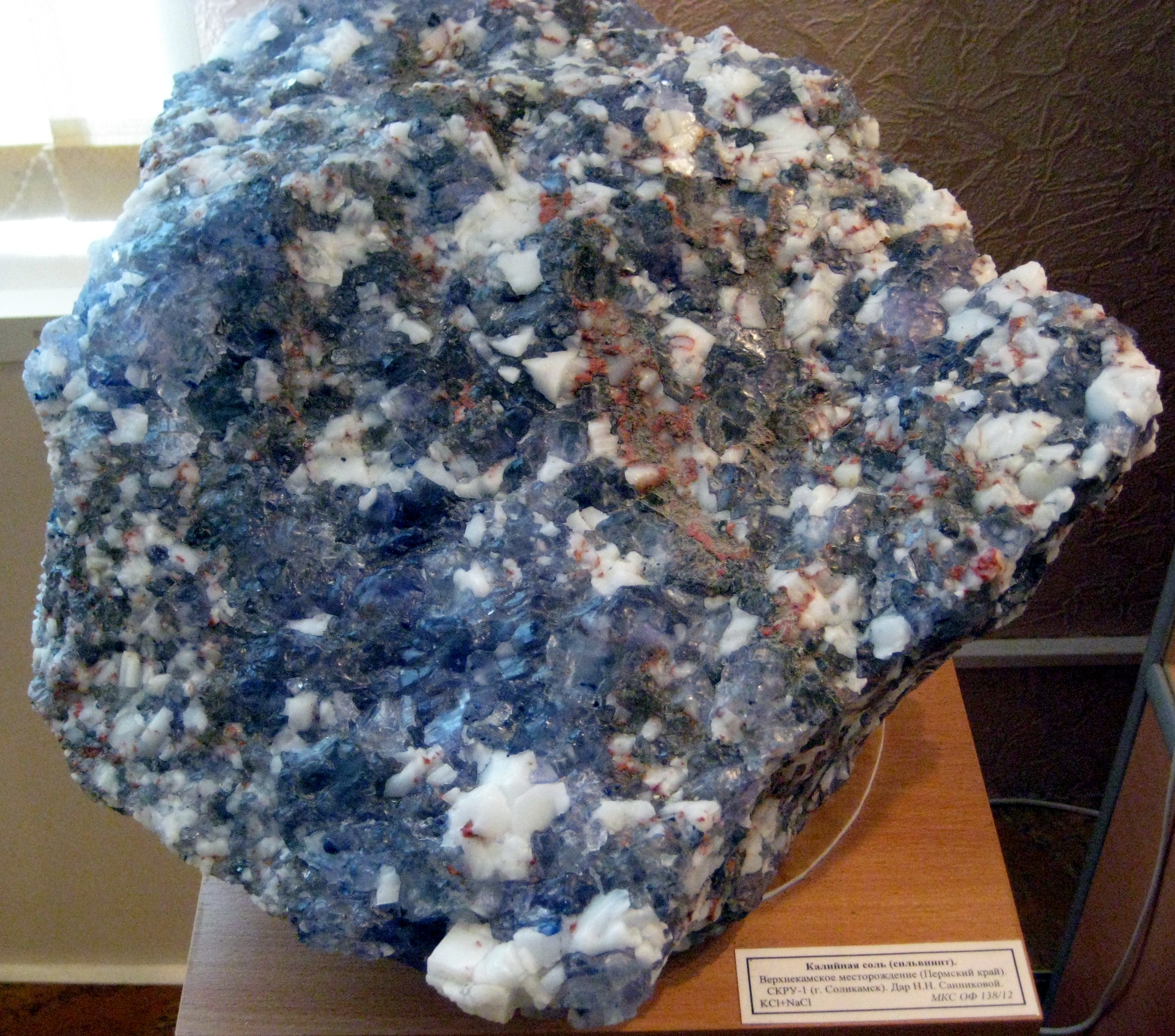
Sylvinite from Perm Krai, Russia

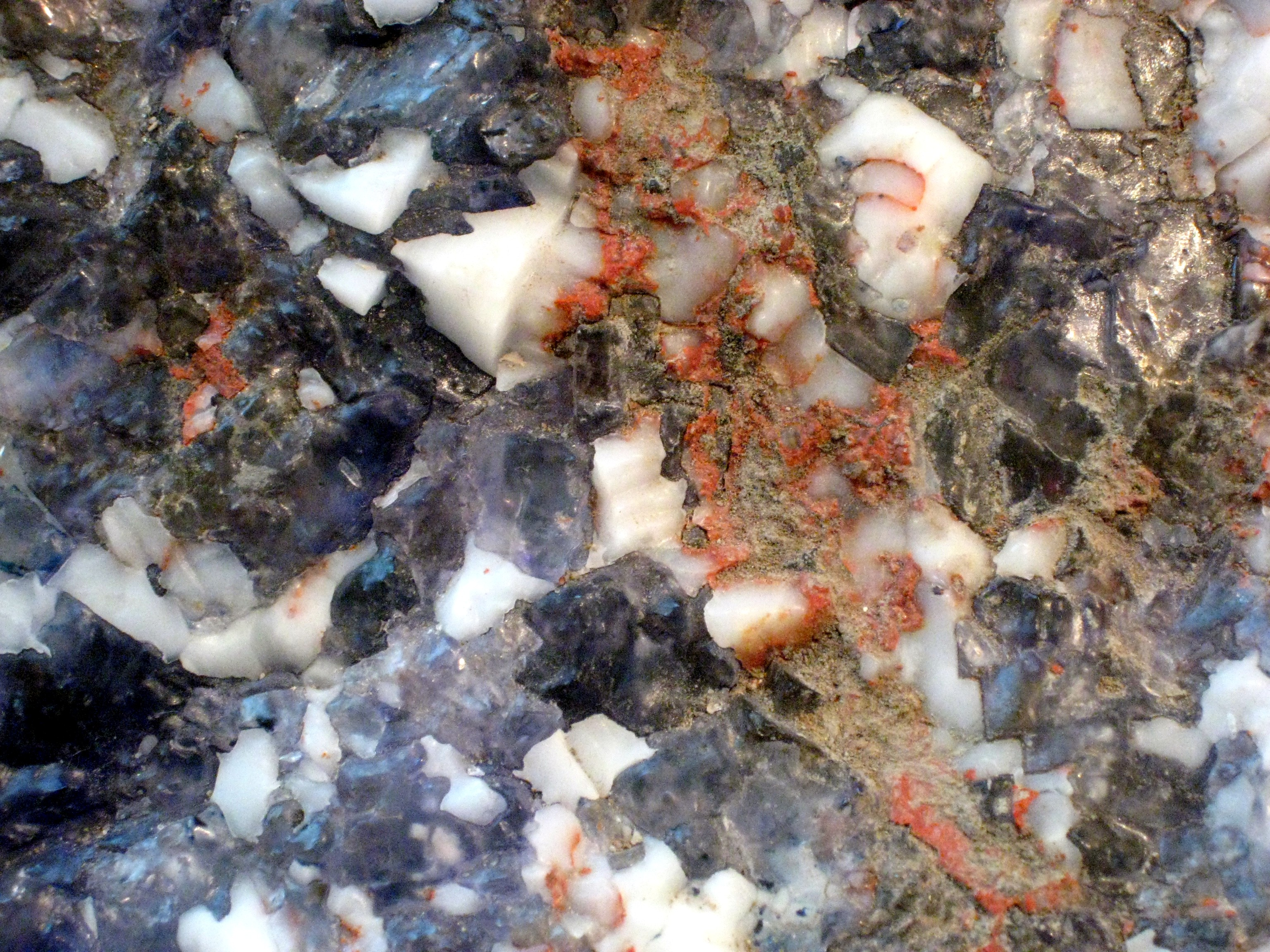
Close-up view of sylvinite from Perm, Russia

Sylvinite is a sedimentary rock made of a mechanical mixture of the minerals sylvite (KCl, or potassium chloride) and halite (NaCl, or sodium chloride). Sylvinite is the most important source for the production of potash in North America, Russia and the UK. Most Canadian operations mine sylvinite with proportions of approximately 31% KCl and 66% NaCl with the balance being insoluble clays, anhydrite and in some locations carnallite. Other deposits of sylvinite are located in Belarus, Brazil, France, Germany, Kazakhstan, Slovakia and Spain.
