= Tacke =

Tacke is a German surname and may refer to:

- Alfred Tacke (born 1951), a German energy and chemical industrial manager and politician
- Gerd Tacke (1906–1997) the CEO of Siemens from 1968 to 1971
- Ida Noddack, née Tacke, (1896–1978), a German chemist and physicist
- Otto Tachenius (born Tacke) (c. 1610 – 1680), an alchemist and physician from Westphalia
- Sarah Tacke (born 1982), German television presenter and legal expert for ZDF

== See also ==
- Tick-tacke, an historical English tables game for two players
- Tack (disambiguation)
