= Rudolf von Carnall =

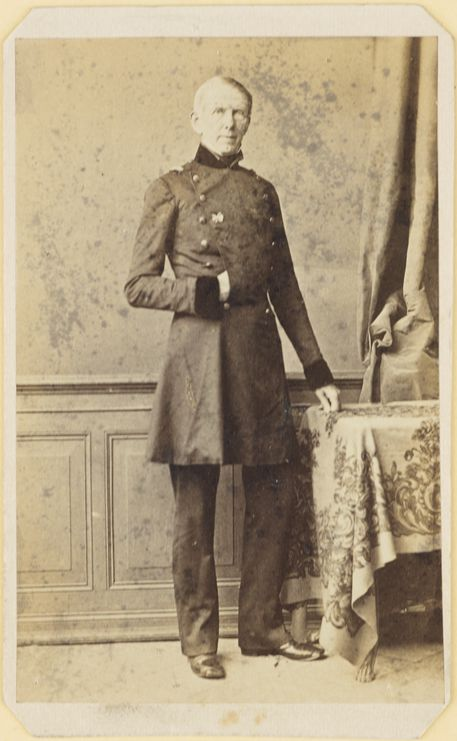

Rudolf von Carnall (9 February 1804 – 17 November 1874) was a German mining engineer and mineralogist. The mineral carnallite was named after him.

Carnall was born in Glatz (now Klodzko, Poland) to Prussian-Swedish army officer Arvid (1760-1840) and Mathilde daughter of Le Cointe. Carnall was trained in civil mining and worked at mines before training in Berlin. He became a mine superintendent in Upper Silesia, while also teaching at the mining school in Tarnowitz. In 1845 he founded the Deutsche Geologische Gesellschaft along with Leopold von Buch and Gustav Rose. In 1855 he received a PhD from the University of Berlin and became a Berghauptmann in 1855 in the Prussian ministry of commerce.
