= Helwig Dieterich =

Helwig Dieterich Latinized as Helvicus Dietericus (24 June 1601 – 13 December 1655) was a German physician and chemist. He served as a physician to several members of royalty and nobility but earned notoriety after several of his cures were questionable and proved deadly. Otto Tachenius wrote an Apologia in 1652 in which he declared Dieterich as a pseudo-chimicum (false chemist) and a fraud.

== Life and work ==
Dieterich was born in Kyrtorf in Hesse-Darmstadt, son of the priest and theologian Johannes (1572–1635) and Barbara Reichard. His father later became a superintendent at Giessen where Dieterich went to study from 1615. After some studies in theology and language, he shifted to medicine and chemistry at Tübingen, then Altdorf and Wittenberg. At Tübingen he studied under Jacob Müller and at Altdorf he studied under Caspar Hoffmann. At Wittenberg he studied under Daniel Sennert. He travelled in Italy around 1625 and worked at Rüeber's Apotheke zum Löwen in Ulm with studies under the physician Sebastian Stromeier. He received a doctoral degree in 1627 at Strasbourg under J. R. Salzmann. The next year he became a physician to the Landgrave Georg II of Hesse-Darmstadt and then to Georg Wilhelm of Brandenburg. In 1633 he accompanied the Landgrave to Dresden to attend a meeting with Johann Georg, Elector of Saxony. In 1638 he was called to treat Prince Christian whose leg had been injured by a carriage wheel running over it. The treatment with astringents and tight binding had caused gangrene and other complications. Dieterich stayed at Nykjøbing Castle for a year but when the Elector died in 1640, it was said that Dieterich's cures may have hastened the death. He had made use of antimony and mercury in the treatments. He then worked for Duke Frederik III of Holsten-Gottorp and then King Christian IV who made him his physician. In 1652 Otto Tachenius claimed that Dieterich was a charlatan. Dieterich had apparently promised a treatment for the King consisting of Aurum potabile (gold tonic) and subsequently giving the king a fake medicine and stealing the gold for himself. Dieterich lost his position in 1646 after poor treatments.
