= Uricite =

Rare organic mineral form of uric acid

General
- Category: Minerals
- Formula: C_{5}H_{4}N_{4}O_{3}
- IMA symbol: Uri
- Strunz classification: 10.CA.40
- Crystal system: Monoclinic
- Crystal class: Prismatic (2/m) (same H-M symbol)
- Space group: P2_{1}/a
- Unit cell: a = 14.46 Å, b = 7.4 Å c = 6.2 Å; β = 65.2°; Z = 4

Identification
- Color: Yellowish white, colorless, light brown
- Mohs scale hardness: 1–2
- Streak: White
- Diaphaneity: Translucent
- Specific gravity: 1.85 (calculated)
- Optical properties: Biaxial

Uricite is a rare organic mineral form of uric acid, C_{5}H_{4}N_{4}O_{3}. It is a soft yellowish white mineral which crystallizes in the monoclinic system.

== Discovery and occurrence ==
It was first described in 1973 for an occurrence in bat guano in Dingo Donga Cave, Eucla, Western Australia. The name is for its composition, anhydrous uric acid. It occurs with biphosphammite, brushite and syngenite at the type locality in Dingo Donga Cave.
