= Langbeinite =

Potassium magnesium sulfate mineral

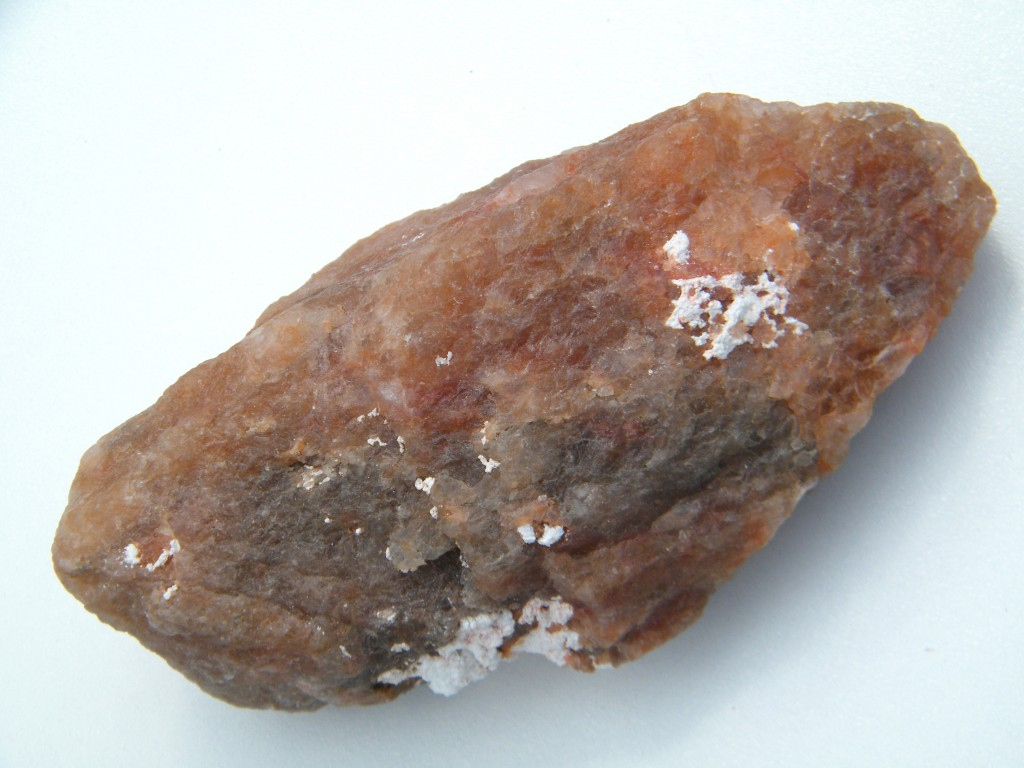

General
- Category: Sulfate mineral
- Formula: K_{2}Mg_{2}(SO_{4})_{3}
- IMA symbol: Lbn
- Strunz classification: 7.AC.10
- Crystal system: Cubic
- Crystal class: Tetartoidal (23) (same H-M symbol)
- Space group: P2_{1}3
- Unit cell: a = 9.92 Å; Z = 4

Identification
- Color: Colorless with pale shades of yellow, pink, red, green, gray
- Crystal habit: As nodules, disseminated grains, bedded massive
- Fracture: Conchoidal
- Tenacity: Brittle
- Mohs scale hardness: 3.5–4
- Luster: Vitreous
- Diaphaneity: Transparent
- Specific gravity: 2.83
- Optical properties: Isotropic
- Refractive index: n = 1.5329–1.5347
- Solubility: 280 g/L (20°C); Slowly dissolves in water
- Other characteristics: Piezoelectric

Langbeinite is a potassium magnesium sulfate mineral with the chemical formula K_{2}Mg_{2}(SO_{4})_{3}. Langbeinite crystallizes in the isometric-tetartoidal (cubic) system as transparent colorless or white with pale tints of yellow to green and violet crystalline masses. It has a vitreous luster. The Mohs hardness is 3.5 to 4 and the specific gravity is 2.83. The crystals are piezoelectric.

The mineral is an ore of potassium and occurs in marine evaporite deposits in association with carnallite, halite, and sylvite.

It was first described in 1891 for an occurrence in Wilhelmshall, Halberstadt, Saxony-Anhalt, Germany, and named for A. Langbein of Leopoldshall, Germany.

Langbeinite gives its name to the langbeinites, a family of substances with the same cubic structure, a tetrahedral anion, and large and small cations.

Related substances include hydrated salts leonite (K_{2}Mg(SO_{4})_{2}·4H_{2}O) and picromerite (K_{2}Mg(SO_{4})_{2}·6H_{2}O).
