= Arcanite =

Potassium sulfate mineral

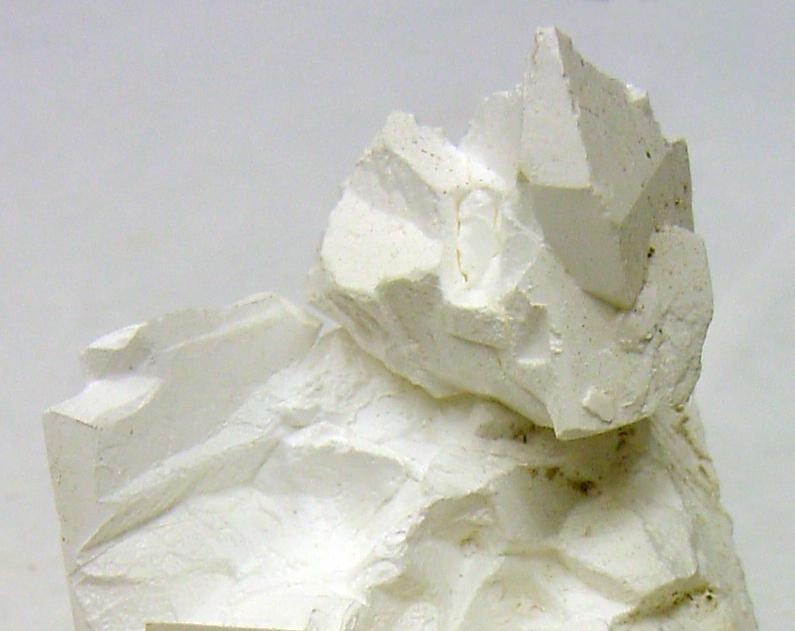
- Arcanite

General
- Category: Sulfate mineral
- Formula: K_{2}SO_{4}
- IMA symbol: Acn
- Strunz classification: 7.AD.05
- Crystal system: Orthorhombic
- Crystal class: Dipyramidal (mmm); H-M symbol: (2/m 2/m 2/m)
- Space group: Pmcn
- Unit cell: a = 5.77, b = 10.07 c = 7.48 [Å]; Z = 4

Identification
- Color: White to colorless, yellow
- Crystal habit: Tabular crystals, typically in crusts and coatings
- Twinning: Cyclic on {110}
- Cleavage: Good on {010} and {001}
- Mohs scale hardness: 2
- Luster: Vitreous
- Streak: White
- Diaphaneity: Transparent to translucent
- Specific gravity: 2.66
- Optical properties: Biaxial (+)
- Refractive index: n_{α} = 1.494 n_{β} = 1.495 n_{γ} = 1.497
- Birefringence: δ = 0.004
- 2V angle: Measured: 67°

Arcanite is a potassium sulfate mineral with formula K_{2}SO_{4}.

Arcanite was first described in 1845 for an occurrence in old pine railroad ties in the Santa Ana tin mine, Trabuco Canyon, Santa Ana Mountains, Orange County, California, US. It has also been reported from hydrothermal deposits in the Cesano geothermal field, Latium, Italy; in bat guano on the Chincha Islands of Peru; and in caves in Western Australia, South Africa and Namibia.

Well-crystalline specimens sold as 'arcanite' are grown synthetically in places such as Poland for the decorative specimen market and are not natural minerals.
