= Kainite =

Evaporite mineral

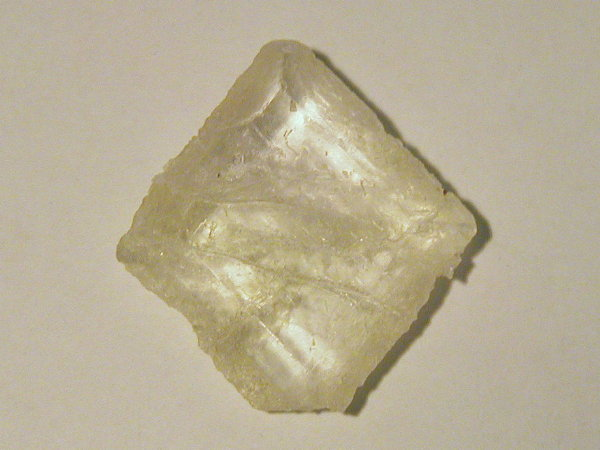

General
- Category: Sulfate minerals
- Formula: KMg(SO_{4})Cl·3H_{2}O
- Strunz classification: 7.DF.10
- Crystal system: Monoclinic
- Crystal class: Prismatic (2/m) (same H-M symbol)
- Space group: C2/m
- Unit cell: a = 19.72, b = 16.23 c = 9.53 [Å]; β = 94.92°; Z = 16

Identification
- Color: Colorless; yellow, brownish, greyish-green, red, violet, blue
- Crystal habit: Crystal aggregates, fibrous, massive
- Cleavage: {001}, perfect
- Fracture: Splintery
- Tenacity: Brittle
- Mohs scale hardness: 2.5–3
- Luster: Vitreous
- Streak: White
- Diaphaneity: Transparent
- Specific gravity: 2.15
- Optical properties: Biaxial (−)
- Refractive index: n_{α} = 1.494 n_{β} = 1.505 n_{γ} = 1.516
- Birefringence: δ = 0.022
- Pleochroism: Visible: X = violet, Y = blue, Z = yellowish
- 2V angle: Measured: 90°
- Dispersion: Weak

Kainite (/ˈkaɪnaɪt/ or /ˈkeɪnaɪt/) (KMg(SO_{4})Cl·3H_{2}O) is an evaporite mineral in the class of "Sulfates (selenates, etc.) with additional anions, with H_{2}O" according to the Nickel–Strunz classification. It is a hydrated potassium-magnesium sulfate-chloride, naturally occurring in irregular granular masses or as crystalline coatings in cavities or fissures. This mineral is dull and soft, and is colored white, yellowish, grey, reddish, or blue to violet. Its name is derived from Greek καινος [kainos] ("(hitherto) unknown"), as it was the first mineral discovered that contained both sulfate and chloride as anions. Kainite forms monoclinic crystals.

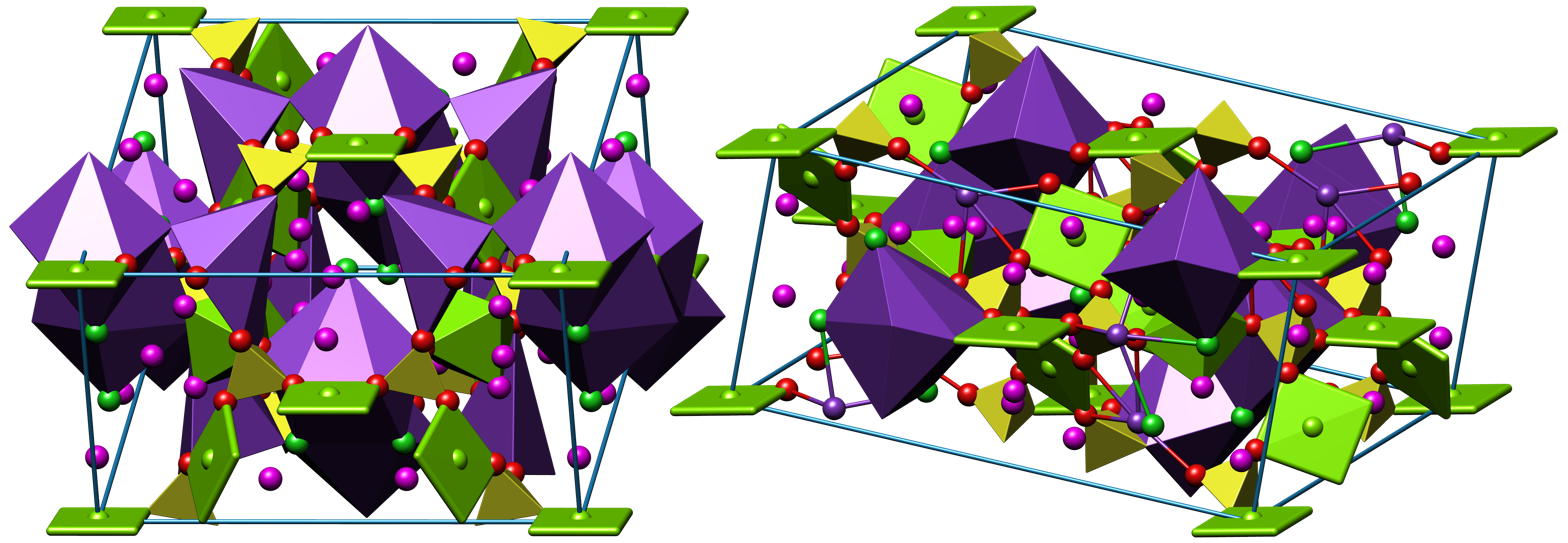
Crystal structure of kainite

== Properties ==
Kainite is of bitter taste and soluble in water. On recrystallization picromerite is deposited from the solution.

== Genesis and occurrence ==
Kainite was discovered in the Stassfurt salt mines in today's Saxony-Anhalt, Germany in 1865 by the mine official Schöne and was first described by Carl Friedrich Jacob Zincken.

Kainite is a typical secondary mineral that forms through metamorphosis in marine deposits of potassium carbonate, and is also occasionally formed through resublimation from volcanic vapours. It is often accompanied by anhydrite, carnallite, halite, and kieserite.

Kainite is only found in comparatively few places, among them in salt mines in central and northern Germany, Bad Ischl (Austria), on Pasquasia in Sicily, in Whitby (UK), and in the Carlsbad Potash District in New Mexico, in volcanic deposits in Kamchatka and in Iceland, and in salt lakes in western China. It has also been identified in Gusev Crater on Mars.

It can also be produced from bittern remaining after removal of table salt from seawater.

== Uses ==
Kainite is used as a source of potassium and magnesium compounds, as a fertilizer, and as gritting salt.
