= Otto Tachenius =

German chemist and physician (c. 1610–1680)

Otto Tachenius born Tacke (c. 1610 – 8 December 1680) was an alchemist and physician from Westphalia who is known for the book Hippocrates Chymicus (1677) which was among the early texts that was among the early texts that suggested that salts and acid-base reactions could be involved in human health and body functioning. He claimed in his book that the basis existed already in the works of Hippocrates.

Tachenius was born in Westphalia to mill owner Heinrich Tacke. After apprenticing in apothecaries in Herford followed by Lemgo (c. 1633) and Bremen, he left, possibly dismissed by his employer for theft. He then travelled under the name of "Tachenius", through Kiel, Danzig (1641), Königsberg, Warsaw and Vienna and then studied at the University of Padua. He received a doctorate in 1647 and became a physician in Venice while also making studies on chemicals such as silica, and the effect of soap on oils. He supported the idea of his teacher Franciscus Sylvius that all reactions involved acids and bases. He claimed that oils had a hidden acid which is released while forming soap when reacting with alkali, noting that soap could dissolve minute amounts of silver. He questioned Van Helmont on the existence of a universal solvent and then went on to sell a proprietary or miracle cure "viperine salt" (sal viperinum). This was criticized by others and Tachenius believed that his critic was Helwig Dieterich, resulting in polemics between the two (and others) which went on until 1656.
