= Kieserite =

Hydrous magnesium sulfate mineral

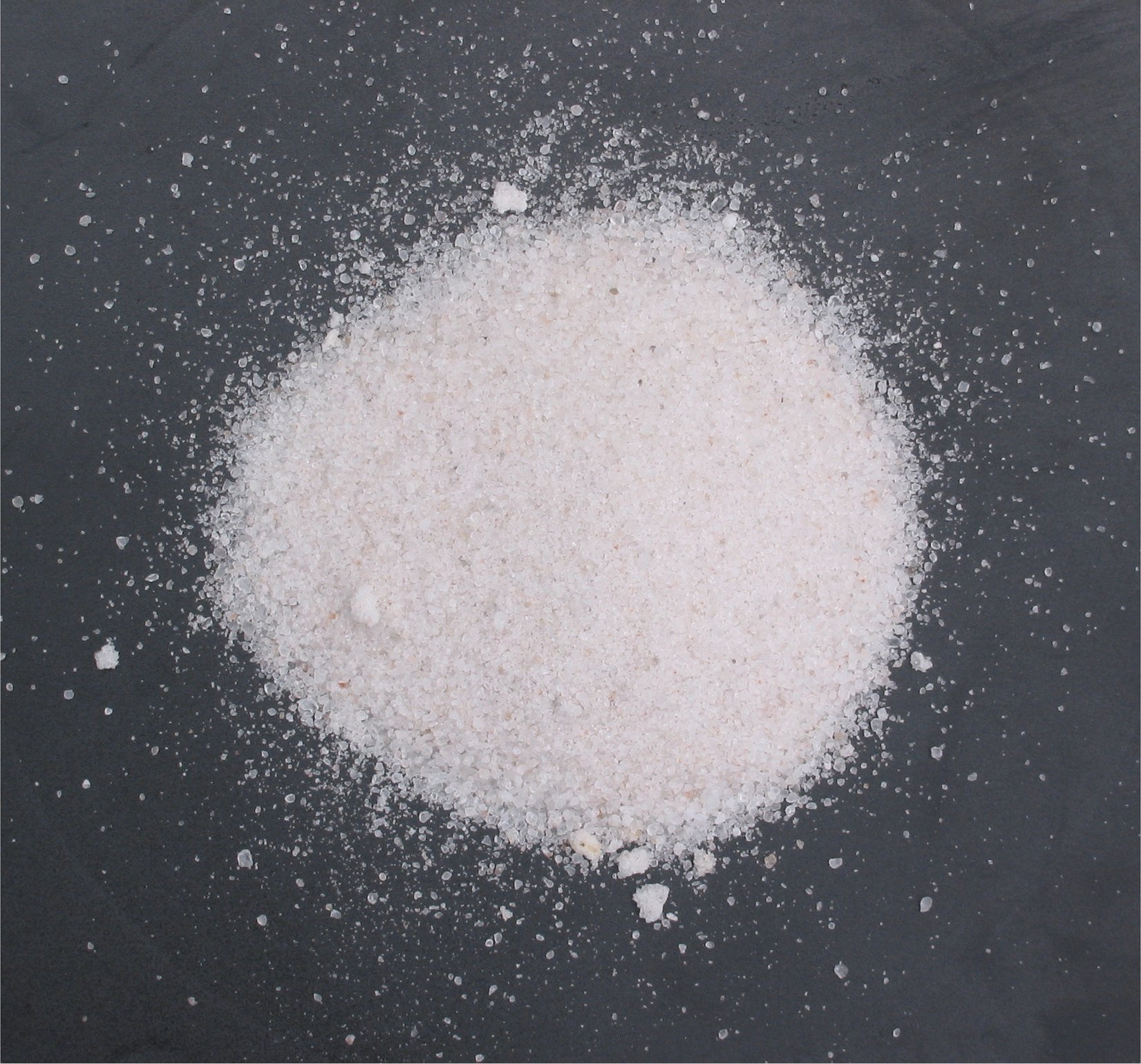

General
- Category: Sulfate minerals
- Formula: MgSO_{4}·H_{2}O
- IMA symbol: Ksr
- Strunz classification: 7.CB.05
- Dana classification: 29.6.2.1
- Crystal system: Monoclinic
- Crystal class: Prismatic (2/m) (same H-M symbol)
- Space group: C2/c
- Unit cell: a = 7.51 Å, b = 7.61 Å c = 6.92 Å; β = 116.17°; Z = 4

Identification
- Color: Colorless, grayish-white or yellowish
- Crystal habit: Massive, granular; rarely as pyramidal crystals
- Twinning: Contact on {001}, polysynthetic about [110]
- Cleavage: {110} and {111} perfect
- Fracture: Uneven
- Tenacity: Fragile
- Mohs scale hardness: 3.5
- Luster: Vitreous to dull
- Streak: White
- Diaphaneity: Transparent to translucent
- Specific gravity: 2.57
- Optical properties: Biaxial (+)
- Refractive index: nα = 1.520 nβ = 1.533 nγ = 1.584
- Birefringence: δ = 0.064
- 2V angle: 55°
- Dispersion: r > v, moderate
- Solubility: In water

Kieserite, or magnesium sulfate monohydrate, is a hydrous magnesium sulfate mineral with formula (MgSO_{4}·H_{2}O).

It has a vitreous luster and it is colorless, grayish-white or yellowish. Its hardness is 3.5 and crystallizes in the monoclinic crystal system. Gunningite is the zinc member of the kieserite group of minerals.

== Etymology ==
It is named after Dietrich Georg von Kieser (Jena, Germany 1862).

== Occurrence ==
Kieserite commonly occurs in marine evaporites and rarely in volcanic environments as a sublimate. It occurs in association with halite, carnallite, polyhalite, anhydrite, boracite, sulfoborite, leonite, epsomite and celestine.

=== Mars ===
In early 2005, Mars Express, a European Space Agency orbiter, discovered evidence of kieserite in patches of Valles Marineris (the largest canyon on Mars), along with gypsum and polyhydrated sulfates. This is direct evidence of Mars's watery past and augments similar discoveries made by the Mars Exploration Rover Opportunity in 2004.

=== Moons of Jupiter ===
Kieserite might also be a rock-forming mineral in the icy mantle of the outer three Galilean moons (Europa, Ganymede, Callisto). At pressures higher than 2.7 GPa, kieserite transforms to a triclinic crystal structure.

== Uses ==
It is used in the production of Epsom salt and as a fertilizer, the overall global annual usage in agriculture in the mid 1970s was 2.3 million tons.

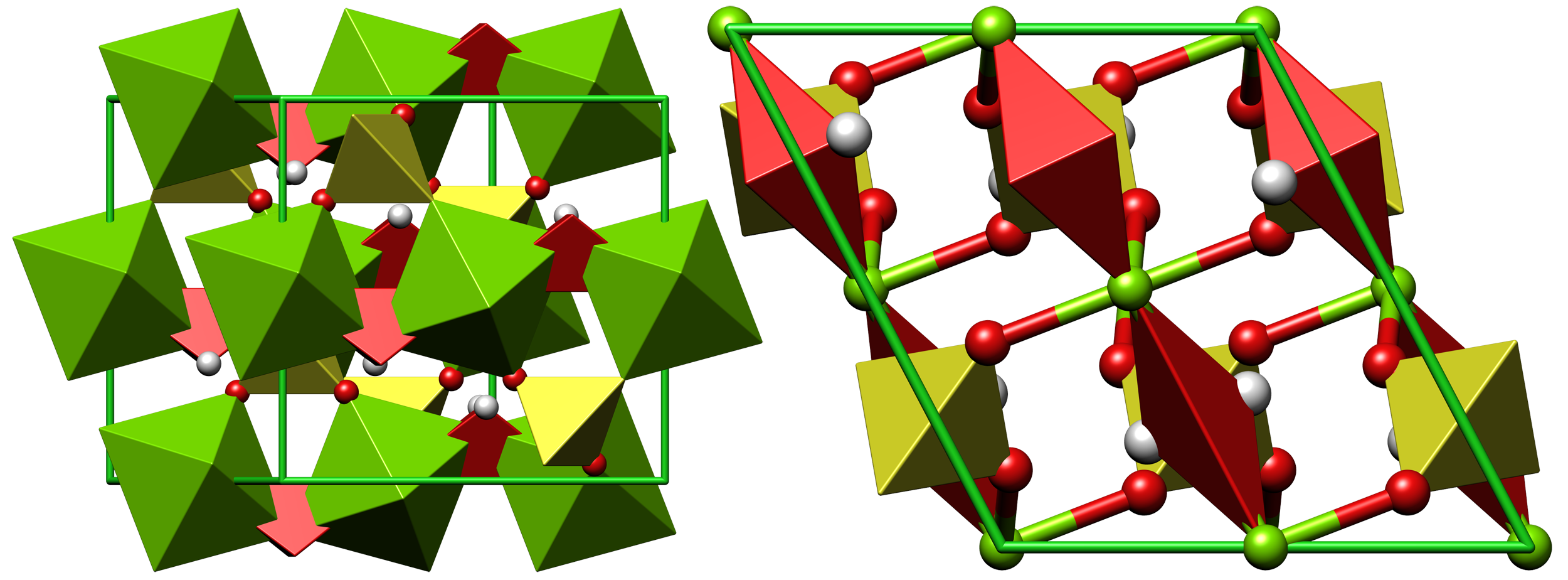
Crystal structure of kieserite

Kieserite is also used for cleaning hard water deposits from tiles, stones, and other pool and fountain lining materials. Due to its hardness, which is greater than hard water deposits but less than tiles and other water feature linings, it is blasted at the hard water deposits to remove them.

When used as a fertilizer, response to kieserite is likely where:

- Soil Mg levels are low
- pH is high
- Intensive liming occurs to raise the pH
- Nitrogen is applied as ammonium, as this can lead to an antagonism between ammonium and magnesium
- Compacted soils exist
- There is a period of wet/cold weather
- Dry weather occurs, leading to low magnesium mobility in the soil profile.

== See also ==
- List of minerals
- List of minerals named after people
