= Sylvite =

Potassium chloride mineral

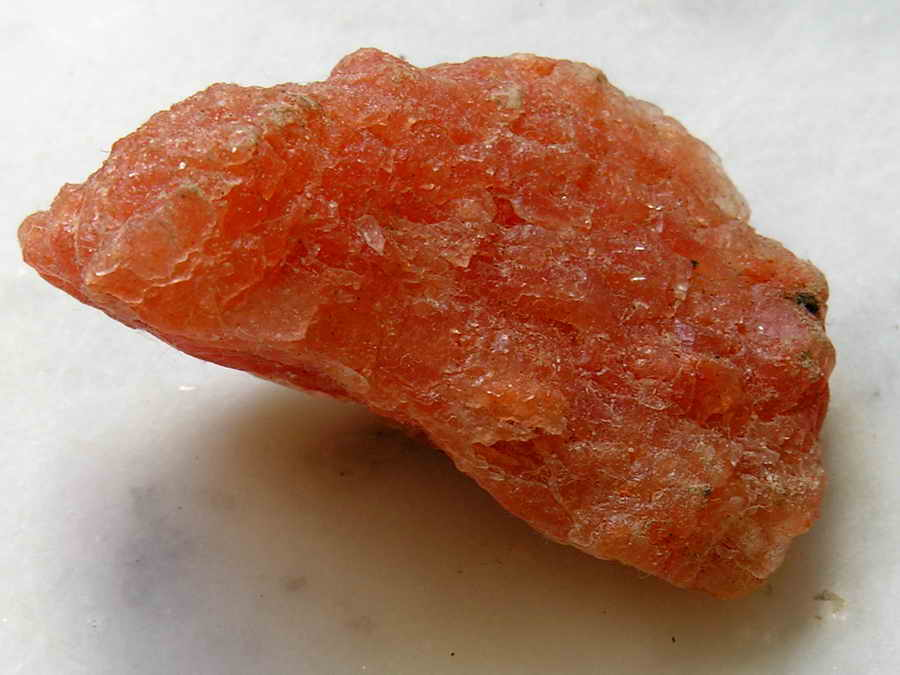

General
- Category: Halide mineral
- Formula: KCl
- IMA symbol: Syl
- Strunz classification: 3.AA.20
- Crystal system: Isometric
- Crystal class: Hexoctahedral (m3̅m); H-M symbol: (4/m 3̅ 2/m)
- Space group: Fm3m
- Unit cell: a = 6.2931 Å; Z = 4

Identification
- Formula mass: 74.55 g/mol
- Color: Colorless to white, pale gray, pale blue; may be yellowish red to red due to hematite inclusions
- Crystal habit: As cubes and octahedra; columnar, in crusts, coarse granular, massive
- Cleavage: Perfect on [100], [010], [001]
- Fracture: Uneven
- Tenacity: Brittle to ductile
- Mohs scale hardness: 2
- Luster: Vitreous
- Streak: White
- Diaphaneity: Transparent to translucent
- Specific gravity: 1.993
- Optical properties: Isotropic
- Refractive index: 1.4903
- Pleochroism: Visible in colored crystals
- Ultraviolet fluorescence: None
- Solubility: Soluble in water
- Other characteristics: Salty to bitter taste

Sylvite, or sylvine, is potassium chloride (KCl) in natural mineral form. It forms crystals in the isometric system very similar to normal rock salt, halite (NaCl). The two are, in fact, isomorphous. Sylvite is colorless to white with shades of yellow and red due to inclusions. It has a Mohs hardness of 2.5 and a specific gravity of 1.99. It has a refractive index of 1.4903. Sylvite has a salty taste with a distinct bitterness.

Sylvite is one of the last evaporite minerals to precipitate out of solution. As such, it is found only in very dry saline areas. Its principal use is as a potassium fertilizer.

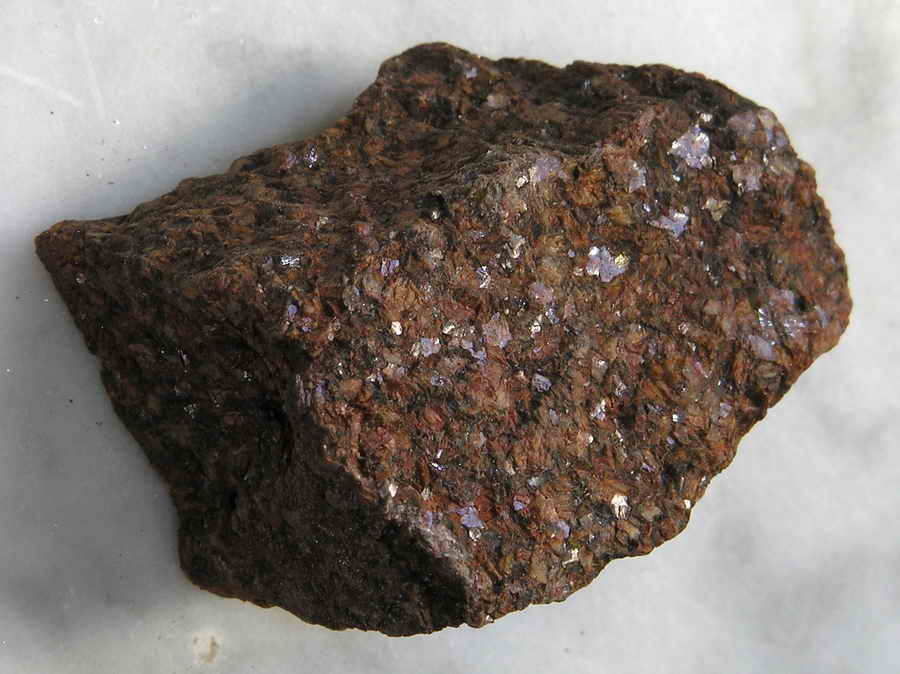
Sylvite

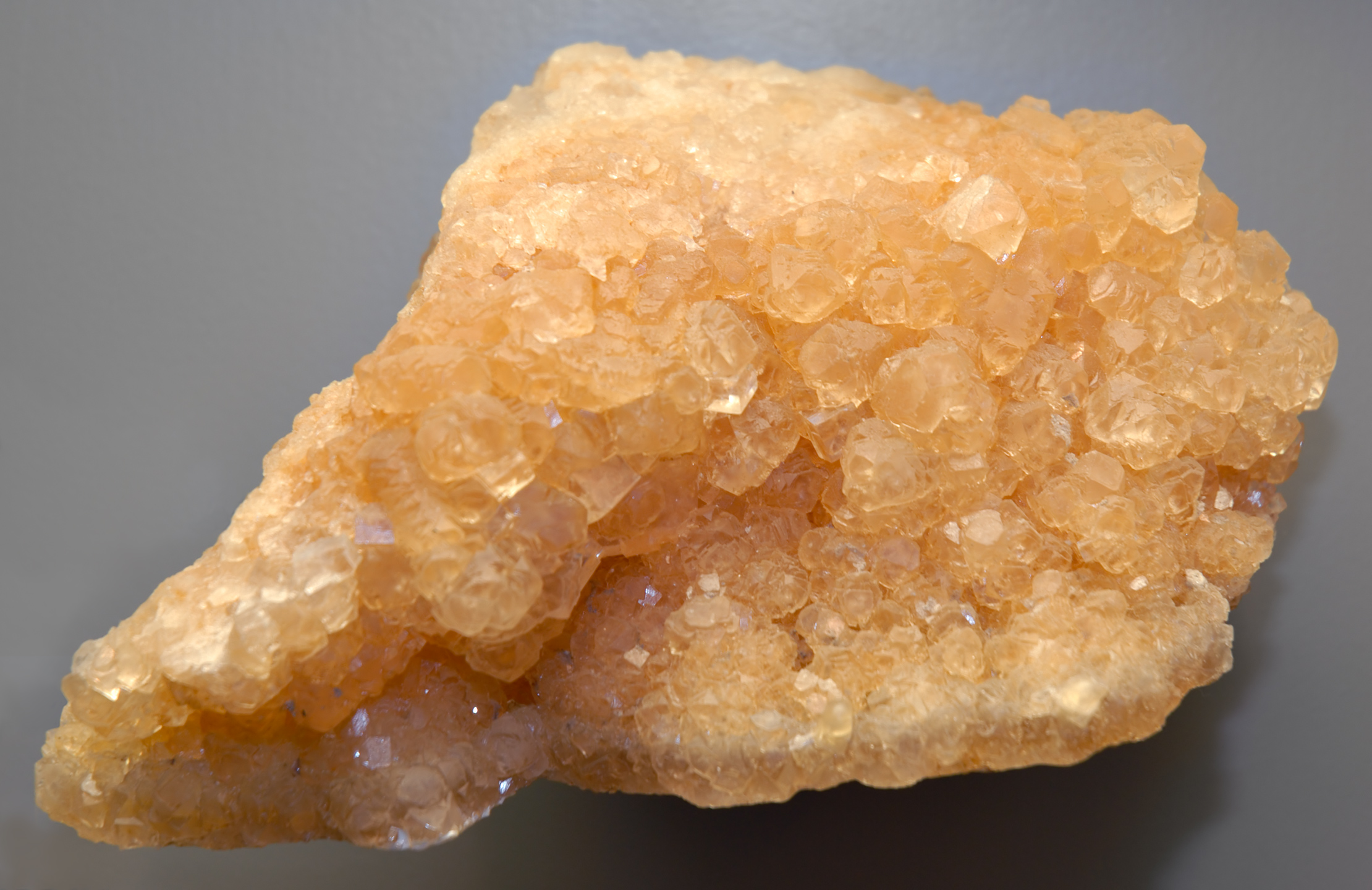
Sylvite from Germany

Sylvite is found in many evaporite deposits worldwide. Massive bedded deposits occur in New Mexico and western Texas, and in Utah in the US, but the largest world source is in Saskatchewan, Canada. The vast deposits in Saskatchewan were formed by the evaporation of a Devonian seaway. Sylvite is the official mineral of Saskatchewan.

Sylvite was first described in 1832 at Mount Vesuvius near Napoli in Italy and named after historical KCl designations sal degistivum Sylvii (Sylvius' digestive salt) and sal febrifugum Sylvii (Sylvius' fever-reducing salt), which are named after the Dutch physician and chemist François Sylvius de le Boe (1614–1672).

Sylvite, along with quartz, fluorite and halite, is used for spectroscopic prisms and lenses.

== See also ==
- Sylvinite – Sedimentary rock made of a mechanical mixture of sylvite and halite
