= Picromerite =

Mineral from the class of hydrous sulfates

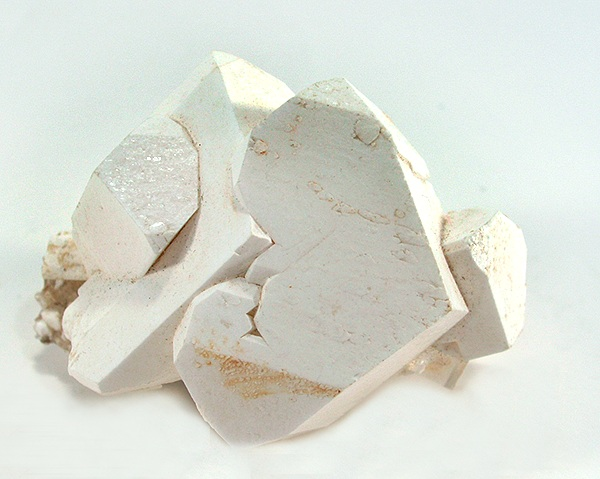
- Picromerite on halite

General
- Category: Sulfate mineral
- Formula: K_{2}Mg(SO_{4})_{2}·6H_{2}O
- IMA symbol: Pmr
- Strunz classification: 7.CC.60
- Dana classification: 29.03.06.01
- Crystal system: Monoclinic
- Crystal class: Prismatic (2/m) (same H-M symbol)
- Space group: P2_{1}/a
- Unit cell: a = 9.07, b = 12.21, c = 6.11 [Å]; β = 104,8°; Z = 2

Identification
- Color: Colorless; white, grey, reddish, yellowish
- Crystal habit: massive aggregates; crusts; prismatic crystals
- Cleavage: perfect {2̅01}
- Mohs scale hardness: 2.5
- Luster: Vitreous
- Streak: White
- Diaphaneity: Transparent
- Density: 2.03
- Optical properties: Biaxial (+)
- Refractive index: n_{α} = 1.461 n_{β} = 1.463 n_{γ} = 1.476
- Birefringence: δ = 0.015
- 2V angle: Measured: 47°
- Solubility: in cold water
- Taste: bitter

Picromerite (synonyms: schoenite, schönite) is a mineral from the class of hydrous sulfates lacking additional anions, and containing medium to large cations according to the Nickel–Strunz classification.

== Etymology ==
The name comes from the Greek words πικρός [pikros] for "bitter" and μέρος [meros] for "part", and relates to the bitter taste of the mineral.

== Occurrence ==
Picromerite is found on comparatively few places, currently (2015) only about 40 localities are known. It was first identified in active volcanic fumaroles on Mount Vesuvius by Arcangelo Scacchi in 1855 and has also been found in volcanic deposits on Mount Etna and on Hawai'i.

It is more commonly found in the kainite zones of some marine salt deposits, among them salt mines in Thuringia, Lower Saxony and Saxony-Anhalt (Germany), near Hall in Tirol, Hallstatt and Bad Ischl (Austria), near Whitby (UK), and in the Carlsbad Potash District (New Mexico), also on salt lakes in western China.

Picromerite can also form in sulfate-rich hydrothermal ore deposits and is found in slag heaps of some ore and coal mines.

Picromerite is often accompanied by anhydrite, epsomite, halite, hohmannite, kainite, metasideronatrite and metavoltine, depending on the locality.

== Properties ==
Picromerite dehydrates in dry air, and crystals then show dull, spherical dehydration zones. Progressive dehydration leads to leonite.
