= Rubidium hydrogen sulfate =

Rubidium hydrogensulfate
rubidium ion
hydrogensulfate ion

Identifiers
CAS Number	15587-72-1
3D model (JSmol)	Interactive image
ChemSpider	141556
ECHA InfoCard	100.036.029
EC Number	239-649-1
PubChem CID	23689122
CompTox Dashboard (EPA)	DTXSID40165980
- InChI: InChI=1S/H2O4S.Rb/c1-5(2,3)4;/h(H2,1,2,3,4);/q;+1/p-1 Key: SCWZRXZHBXDDBE-UHFFFAOYSA-M
- SMILES: OS(=O)(=O)[O-].[Rb+]

Properties
Chemical formula	RbHSO_{4}
Molar mass	182,54 g/mol^{−1}
Appearance	Crystals with no colour
Density	2.89 g·cm^{−3}
Melting point	214 °C (417 °F; 487 K)

Structure
Crystal structure	Monoclinic
Space group	P2_{1}/n
Lattice constant	a = 1440 pm, b = 462.2 pm, c = 1436 pm α = 90°, β = 118.0°, γ = 90°

Thermochemistry
Std enthalpy of formation (Δ_{f}H^{⦵}_{298})	−1166 kJ/mol

Related compounds
Other cations	Rubidium oxide Rubidium hydroxide
Related compounds	Rubidium sulfate
- Except where otherwise noted, data are given for materials in their standard state (at 25 °C [77 °F], 100 kPa). Infobox references

Rubidium hydrogensulfate, sometimes referred to as rubidium bisulfate, is the half neutralized rubidium salt of sulfuric acid. It has the formula RbHSO_{4}.

== Properties ==
It is a hygroscopic compound.

Its crystals are isomorphs with ammonium hydrogensulfate crystals.

Its enthalpy of solution is 15.62 kJ/mol.

After warming up it decomposes to rubidium disulfate and water:

2 RbHSO_{4} → Rb_{2}S_{2}O_{7} + H_{2}O

== Synthesis ==
It may be synthesised with water and a stoichiometric amount of rubidium disulfate. Reaction takes place where there is no humidity:

Rb_{2}S_{2}O_{7} + H_{2}O → 2 RbHSO_{4}

There is another method of creation. It is similar to the synthesis of sodium sulfate and potassium sulfate. This reaction requires rubidium chloride and a little bit of warm sulfuric acid. Some hydrogen chloride is also produced during the reaction.

H_{2}SO_{4} + RbCl → RbHSO_{4} + HCl

== Related compounds ==
Like potassium and caesium, rubidium has another hydrogensulfate compound as well: Rb_{3}H(SO_{4})_{2}.
