= Disulfuric acid =

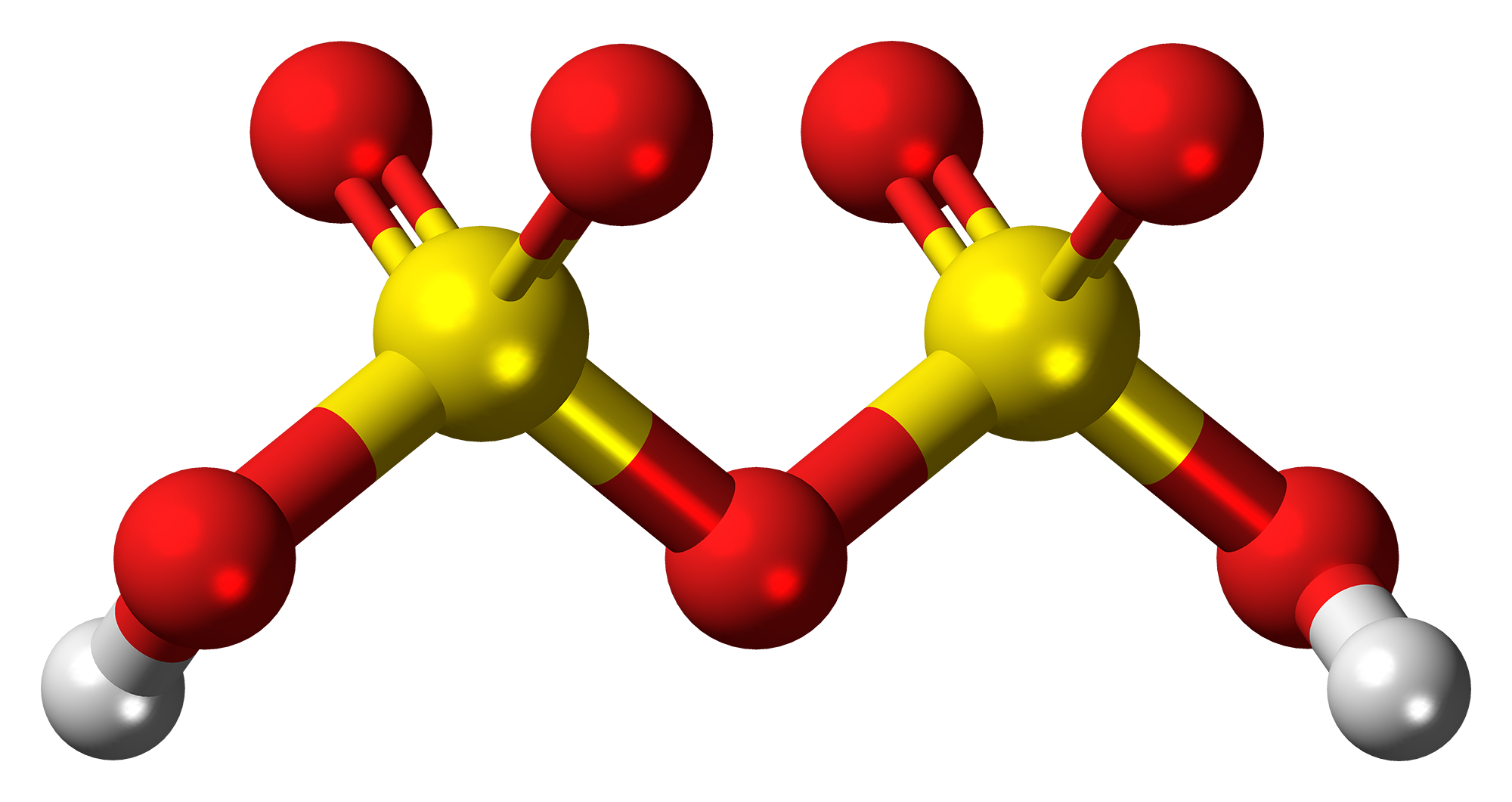

Names
- IUPAC name Disulfuric acid
- Other names Pyrosulfuric acid, Oleum

Identifiers
CAS Number	7783-05-3
3D model (JSmol)	Interactive image; Interactive image; Interactive image
ChEBI	CHEBI:29211
ChemSpider	56433
ECHA InfoCard	100.029.069
EC Number	231-976-8
MeSH	Pyrosulfuric+acid
PubChem CID	62682
UNII	NTC1O8E83E
CompTox Dashboard (EPA)	DTXSID7064817
- InChI: InChI=1S/H2O7S2/c1-8(2,3)7-9(4,5)6/h(H,1,2,3)(H,4,5,6) Key: VFNGKCDDZUSWLR-UHFFFAOYSA-N; InChI=1/H2O7S2/c1-8(2,3)7-9(4,5)6/h(H,1,2,3)(H,4,5,6) Key: VFNGKCDDZUSWLR-UHFFFAOYAZ
- SMILES: OS(=O)(=O)OS(O)(=O)=O; OS(=O)(=O)OS(=O)(=O)O; O=S(=O)(O)OS(=O)(=O)O

Properties
Chemical formula	H_{2}O_{7}S_{2}
Molar mass	178.13 g·mol^{−1}
Appearance	colorless
Melting point	36 °C (97 °F; 309 K)
Acidity (pK_{a})	2.5 (20 °C; in conc_{.} H_{2}SO_{4})
Conjugate base	Disulfate
- Except where otherwise noted, data are given for materials in their standard state (at 25 °C [77 °F], 100 kPa). verify (what is ?) Infobox references

Disulfuric acid (alternative spelling disulphuric acid) or pyrosulfuric acid (alternative spelling pyrosulphuric acid), also named oleum, is a sulfur oxoacid. It is a major constituent of fuming sulfuric acid, oleum, and this is how most chemists encounter it. As confirmed by X-ray crystallography, the molecule consists of a pair of SO_{2}(OH) groups joined by an oxygen atom, giving a molecular formula of H_{2}O_{7}S_{2}.

== Reactions ==
It is also a minor constituent of liquid anhydrous sulfuric acid due to the equilibria:

H_{2}SO_{4}(l) ⇌ H_{2}O(l) + SO_{3}(g)
SO_{3}(g) + H_{2}SO_{4}(l) ⇌ H_{2}S_{2}O_{7}(l)

With the overall equation being:

2 H_{2}SO_{4}(l) ⇌ H_{2}O(l) + H_{2}S_{2}O_{7}(l)

The acid is prepared by reacting excess sulfur trioxide (SO_{3}) with sulfuric acid:

H_{2}SO_{4}(l) + SO_{3}(g) → H_{2}S_{2}O_{7}(l)

Disulfuric acid is the sulfuric acid analog of an acid anhydride. The mutual electron-withdrawing effects of each sulfuric acid unit on its neighbour causes a marked increase in acidity. Disulfuric acid is strong enough to protonate "normal" sulfuric acid in the (anhydrous) sulfuric acid solvent system. There are salts of disulfuric acid, commonly called pyrosulfates, e.g. potassium pyrosulfate.

There are other related acids with the general formula H_{2}O·(SO_{3})_{x} though none can be isolated.

== See also ==
- Pyrophosphoric acid
- Disulfurous acid
- Trithionic acid
