= Potassium bisulfate =

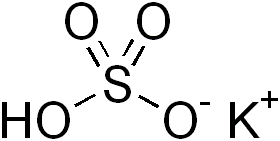
- One potassium cation and one hydrogensulfate anion

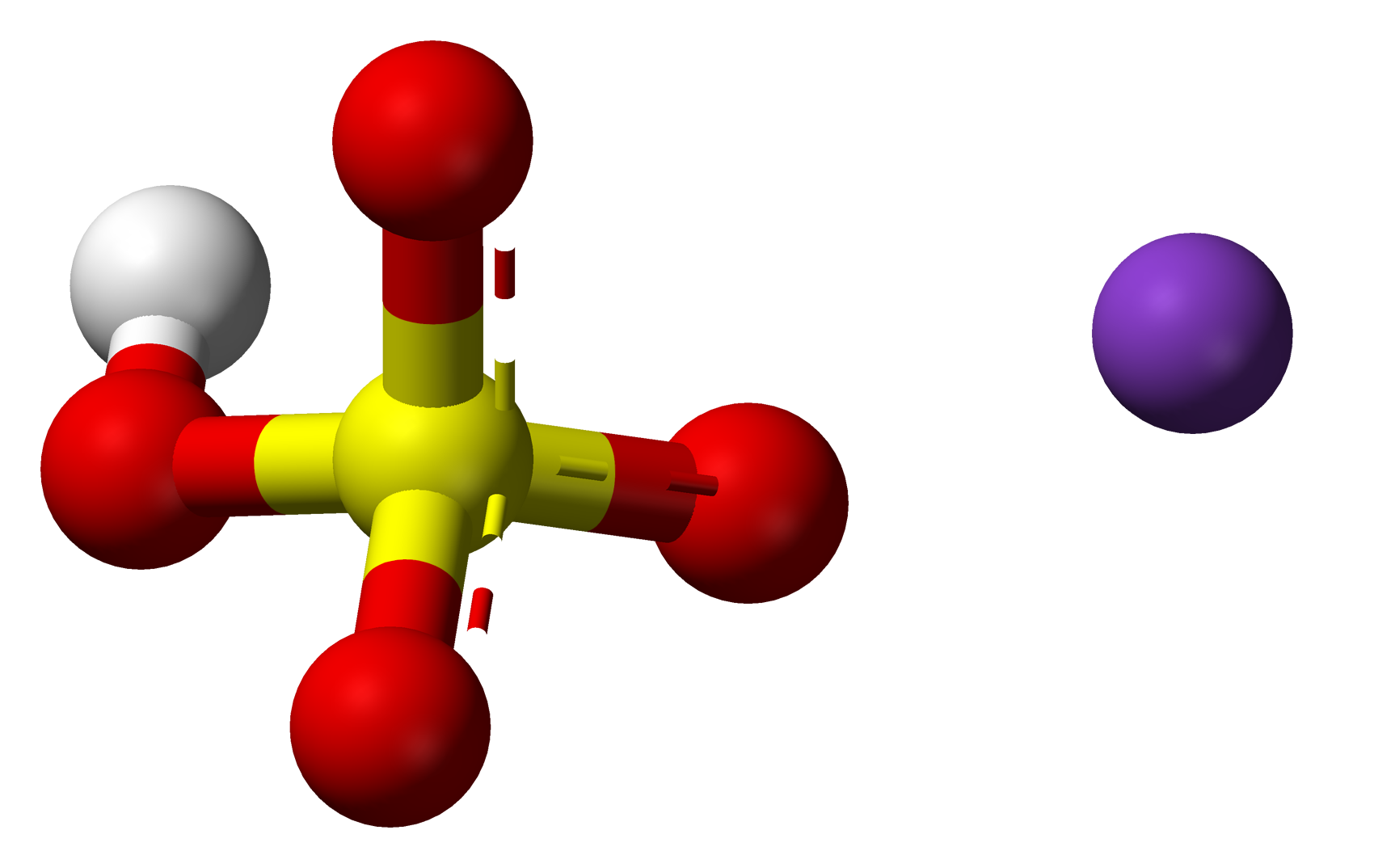
- Ball-and-stick model of the component ions

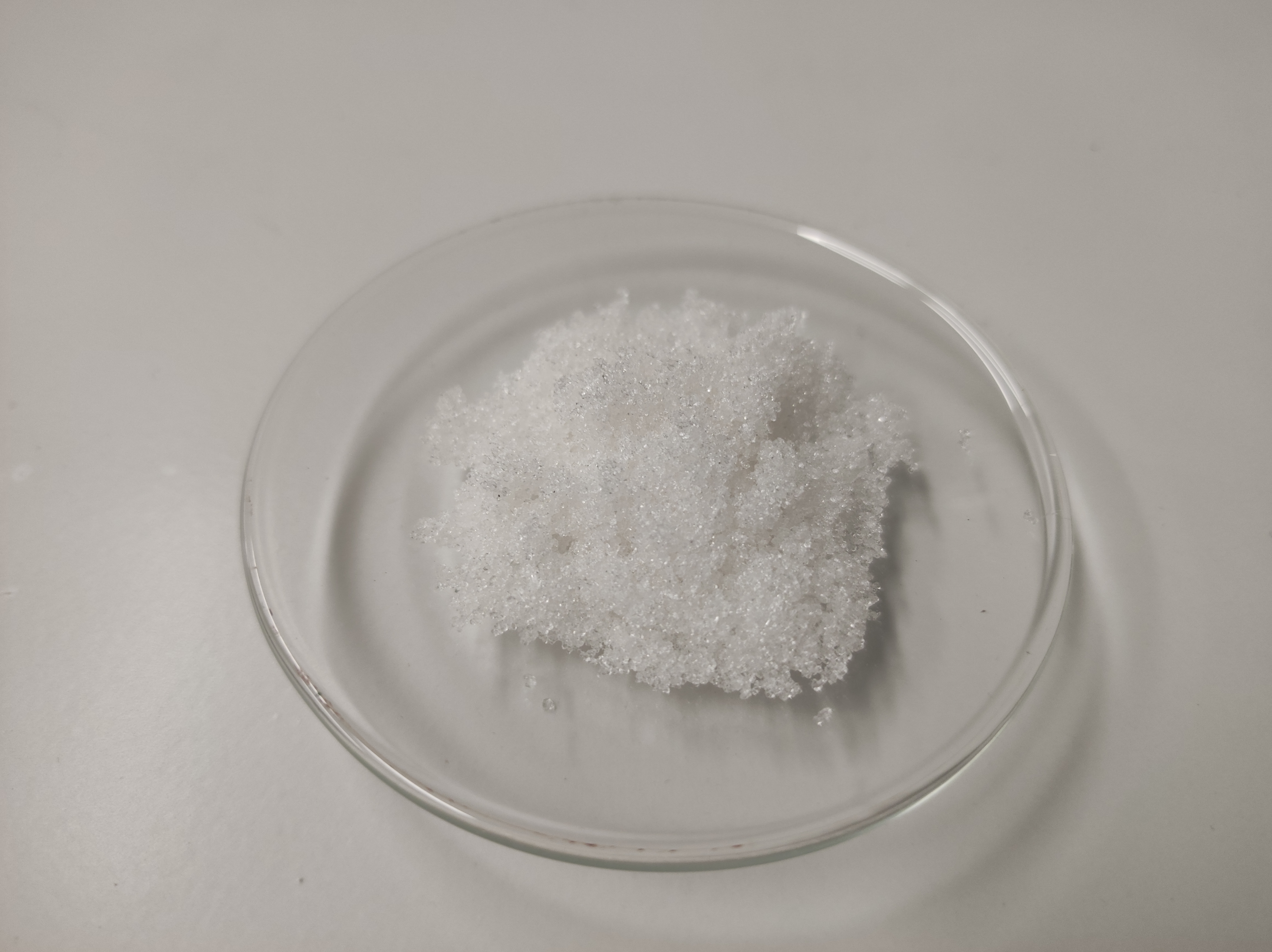
- Potassium bisulfate crystals on filter paper

Names
- IUPAC name Potassium hydrogen sulfate
- Other names Potassium acid sulfate

Identifiers
CAS Number	7646-93-7
3D model (JSmol)	Interactive image
ChemSpider	56396
ECHA InfoCard	100.028.722
EC Number	231-594-1
E number	E515(ii) (acidity regulators, ...)
PubChem CID	516920
RTECS number	TS7200000
UNII	1J1K03241F
UN number	2509
CompTox Dashboard (EPA)	DTXSID8047715
- InChI: InChI=1S/K.H2O4S/c;1-5(2,3)4/h;(H2,1,2,3,4)/q+1;/p-1 Key: CHKVPAROMQMJNQ-UHFFFAOYSA-M; InChI=1/K.H2O4S/c;1-5(2,3)4/h;(H2,1,2,3,4)/q+1;/p-1 Key: CHKVPAROMQMJNQ-REWHXWOFAH
- SMILES: OS(=O)(=O)[O-].[K+]

Properties
Chemical formula	KHSO_{4}
Molar mass	136.169 g/mol
Appearance	colorless solid
Odor	odorless
Density	2.245 g/cm^{3}
Melting point	197 °C (387 °F; 470 K)
Boiling point	300 °C (572 °F; 573 K) (decomposes to form potassium pyrosulfate and water)
Solubility in water	36.6 g/100 mL (0 °C); 49 g/100 mL (20 °C); 121.6 g/100 mL (100 °C)
Solubility	soluble in acetone, insoluble in ethanol.
Magnetic susceptibility (χ)	−49.8·10^{−6} cm^{3}/mol

Thermochemistry
Std enthalpy of formation (Δ_{f}H^{⦵}_{298})	−1163.3 kJ/mol

Hazards
- GHS labelling
Pictograms	(GHS05: Corrosive) (GHS07: Exclamation mark)
Signal word	Danger
Hazard statements	H314, H335
Precautionary statements	P260, P264, P271, P280, P301+P330+P331, P303+P361+P353, P304+P340, P305+P351+P338, P310, P312, P321, P363, P403+P233, P405, P501
- Lethal dose or concentration (LD, LC)
LD_{50} (median dose)	2340 mg*kg^{−1}
Safety data sheet (SDS)	External MSDS

Related compounds
Related compounds	Potassium sulfate Sodium bisulfate
- Except where otherwise noted, data are given for materials in their standard state (at 25 °C [77 °F], 100 kPa). verify (what is ?) Infobox references

Potassium bisulfate (potassium bisulphate) is an inorganic compound with the chemical formula KHSO_{4} and is the potassium acid salt of sulfuric acid. It is a white, water-soluble solid.

== Preparation ==
More than 1 million tons were produced in 1985 as the initial stage in the Mannheim process for producing potassium sulfate. The relevant conversion is the exothermic reaction of potassium chloride and sulfuric acid:

KCl + H_{2}SO_{4} → HCl + KHSO_{4}

Potassium bisulfate is a by-product in the production of nitric acid from potassium nitrate and sulfuric acid:

KNO_{3} + H_{2}SO_{4} → KHSO_{4} + HNO_{3}

== Chemical properties ==
Thermal decomposition of potassium bisulfate forms potassium pyrosulfate:

2 KHSO_{4} → K_{2}S_{2}O_{7} + H_{2}O

Above 600 °C potassium pyrosulfate converts to potassium sulfate and sulfur trioxide:

K_{2}S_{2}O_{7} → K_{2}SO_{4} + SO_{3}

== Uses ==
Potassium bisulfate is commonly used to prepare potassium bitartrate for winemaking. Potassium bisulfate is also used as a disintegrating agent in analytical chemistry or as a precursor to prepare potassium persulfate, a powerful oxidizing agent.

== Occurrence ==
Mercallite, the mineralogical form of potassium bisulfate, occurs very rarely. Misenite is another more complex form of potassium bisulfate with the formula K_{8}H_{6}(SO_{4})_{7}.
