= Sodium pyrosulfate =

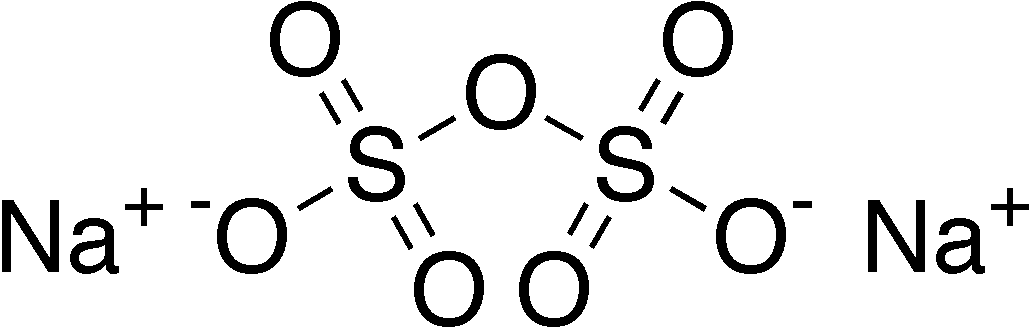

Names
- IUPAC name Disodium disulfate
- Other names Sodium pyrosulphate; Disulfuric acid disodium salt, disodium disulfate; Sodium metabisulfate

Identifiers
CAS Number	13870-29-6
3D model (JSmol)	Interactive image
ChEMBL	ChEMBL111016
ChemSpider	7970254
ECHA InfoCard	100.034.190
EC Number	237-625-5
PubChem CID	9794487
CompTox Dashboard (EPA)	DTXSID60889631
- InChI: InChI=1S/2Na.H2O7S2/c;;1-8(2,3)7-9(4,5)6/h;;(H,1,2,3)(H,4,5,6)/q2*+1;/p-2 Key: JXAZAUKOWVKTLO-UHFFFAOYSA-L
- SMILES: [Na+].[Na+].[O-]S(=O)(=O)OS(=O)(=O)[O-]

Properties
Chemical formula	Na_{2}S_{2}O_{7}
Molar mass	222.12 g/mol
Appearance	Translucent white crystals
Density	2.658 g/cm^{3}
Melting point	400.9 °C (753.6 °F; 674.0 K)
Boiling point	decomposes at 460 °C (860 °F; 733 K)
Solubility in water	hydrolyses
- Except where otherwise noted, data are given for materials in their standard state (at 25 °C [77 °F], 100 kPa). verify (what is ?) Infobox references

Sodium pyrosulfate is an inorganic compound with the chemical formula of Na_{2}S_{2}O_{7}. It is a colorless salt. It hydrolyses in water to form sodium bisulfate with a chemical formula of NaHSO_{4} which has a pH of around 1.

== Preparation ==
Sodium pyrosulfate is obtained by heating sodium bisulfate to 280 °C (536 °F)

2 NaHSO_{4} → Na_{2}S_{2}O_{7} + H_{2}O

Temperatures above 460 °C further decompose the compound, producing sodium sulfate and sulfur trioxide:

Na_{2}S_{2}O_{7} → Na_{2}SO_{4} + SO_{3}

== Applications ==
Sodium pyrosulfate was used in analytical chemistry. Samples are fused with sodium pyrosulfate to ensure complete dissolution before a quantitative analysis.

== See also ==
- Pyrosulfate
- Potassium bisulfate
- Potassium pyrosulfate
