= Sulfatomolybdate =

Class of chemical compounds

A sulfatomolybdate or molybdosulfate is a chemical compound containing sulfate groups links to molybdate groups via common oxygen atoms.

Sulfatomolybdates can contain molybdenum in four-, five- or six-fold coordination (MoO_{4}, MoO_{5} or MoO_{6}). The sulfato component is always tetrahedral (SO_{4}). These substances increase the diversity of material structures, and so are under investigation for interesting material properties. These include laser, luminescence, phosphors and scintillators. They are in the category of heteropolymolybdates.

The most similar compounds are the sulfatotungstates. Compounds with selenium instead of sulfur exists. Other high-charge transition metals can form sulfatoniobates, sulfateovanadates and sulfatotantalates.

== Formation ==
Sulfatomolybdates have been made by dissolving molybdenum trioxide in molten potassium pyrosulfate, and other alkali pyrosulfates can be used to make other compounds.

== List ==
formula	crystal system	space group	unit cell	volume	density	comment	ref
S_{2}Mo_{18}O_{62}^{4−}						18-Molybdodisulfate(VI)(4−); yellow	
(SMo_{12}O_{40})^{2-}						Keggin anion	
[C_{5}N_{2}H_{14}]_{2}[(S_{2}Mo_{18}O_{62})-O-VI]•8H_{2}O	orthorhombic		a=17.993 b=13.580 c=1.4193 Z=2	3468.0			
[C_{5}N_{2}H_{14}]_{8}(H_{3}O)_{2}[(S_{2}Mo_{2}Mo_{16}O_{62})-Mo-^{V}-O-VI]_{3} • (C_{5}H_{5}N)_{2}	monoclinic		a=22.665 b =13.74 9 c=32.912 β=104.31° Z=4	9.938			
[C_{5}H_{14}N_{2}][(MoO_{3})_{3}(SO_{4})]·H_{2}O	orthorhombic	P2_{1}2_{1}2_{1}	a=8.5388 b=10.7467 c=18.113	1662.1	2.525	colourless	
[N(CH_{3})_{4}]_{3}[H(SO_{4})_{2}-(MoO_{2}(O_{2}))_{3}]· 3H_{2}O	monoclinic	P2/n	a = 13.497 b = 15.231 c = 32.603 β = 103.113°	6577			
(Me_{4}N)_{2}SO_{4}(MoO_{3})_{9}						yellow	
(Et_{4}N)_{2}SO_{4}(MoO_{3})_{9}						yellow	
(Bu_{4}N)_{2}SO_{4}(MoO_{3})_{9}						yellow	
Na_{2}[MoO_{2}(SO_{4})_{2}]	orthorhombic	Pbcn	a=12.6264 b=7.8092 c =16.715 Z=8	1648.1	2.950	light green	
Na_{4}[MoO_{2}(SO_{4})_{3}]	orthorhombic	P2_{1}2_{1}2_{1}	Z=4			yellow; stable to 436°C	
Na[(CH_{3})_{4}N]_{3}S_{2}Mo_{5}O_{23}·3H_{2}O	monoclinic	P2/c	a= 29.25 b= 12.85 c= 18.24 β= 123.89° Z= 6			colourless	
K_{2}[Мо_{2}(SO_{4})_{4}]							
K_{4}[MoO_{2}(SO_{4})_{3}]	orthorhombic	Pnma	a=7.5931 b=17.128 c=10.5132 Z=4	1367.3			
K_{2}[MoO_{2}(SO_{4})_{2}]	monoclinic	P2_{1}/c	a=9.5122 b=11.8520 c=8.2378 β=99.470 Z=4	916.06	2.863	light blue; melt 405-411°C	
K_{2}[MoO_{2}(SO_{4})_{2}]	monoclinic	Cc	Z=4		2.917	blue; SHG 2×KHP	
K_{2}(Mo_{2}O_{5})(SO_{4})_{2}·3H_{2}O	triclinic	P1_	5.48124 b=9.5360 c=14.1235 α=97.401° β=99.906° γ=90.080° Z=2	720.94		Liangjunite	
K_{8}[(MoO_{2})_{2}(SO_{4})_{6}	monoclinic	P2_{1}/n	a=9.4260 b=4.0022 c=10.3259 β=90.652° Z=2	1362.77	2.794		
KNa(MoO_{2})(SO_{4})_{2}	monoclinic	P2_{1}/c	a =9.6225 b = 11.4049 c = 8.1421 β = 99.179° Z= 4	882.10		hasanovite; insoluble in water	
KAl[(SO_{4})_{1.5}·(MoO_{4})_{0.5}]							
Cu_{3}O(MoO_{4})(SO_{4})	orthorhombic	Pnma	a = 7.420 b = 6.741 c = 13.548 Z=4	677.6		vergasovaite; olive-green	
Cu_{6}O_{2}(MoO_{4})_{3}(SO_{4})	monoclinic	P2_{1}/m	a = 7.5208 b = 6.8602 c = 14.0019 β = 93.471()°	721.09	4.560		
Rb_{2}[MoO_{2}(SO_{4})_{2}]							
Rb_{2}SMo_{3}0_{13}		P2_{1}/n	a=9.221 b = 13.378 c = 10.815 β = 112.65°				
Rb_{2}SMo_{3}0_{13}•0.72H_{2}O							
RbAl[(SO_{4})_{1.5}·(MoO_{4})_{0.5}]							
KGa[(SO_{4})_{1.5}·(MoO_{4})_{0.5}]							
RbGa[(SO_{4})_{1.5}·(MoO_{4})_{0.5}]							
KIn[(SO_{4})_{1.5}·(MoO_{4})_{0.5}]							
RbIn[(SO_{4})_{1.5}·(MoO_{4})_{0.5}]							
CsAl[(SO_{4})_{1.5}·(MoO_{4})_{0.5}]							
CsGa[(SO_{4})_{1.5}·(MoO_{4})_{0.5}]							
CsIn[(SO_{4})_{1.5}·(MoO_{4})_{0.5}]							
Tb_{18(}MoO_{4})_{3}(SO_{4})_{24}•24H_{2}O	cubic		a=6.652				
Dy_{18(}MoO_{4})_{3}(SO_{4})_{24}•24H_{2}O			a=6.638				
Ho_{18(}MoO_{4})_{3}(SO_{4})_{24}•24H_{2}O	cubic		a=6.615				
K_{2}Na_{8}(UO_{2})_{8}Mo_{4}O_{24} (S,Mo)O_{4}	monoclinic	C2/c	a = 24.282 b = 12.117 c = 13.617 β = 106.33º Z= 4	3845.0		orange	
