= Contact process =

Industrial method of sulfuric acid production

The contact process is a method for manufacturing sulfuric acid in the large quantities and high concentrations needed for industrial processes. It entails several steps: oxidation of elemental sulfur to sulfur dioxide (SO_{2}), further oxidation to sulfur trioxide (SO_{3}) by use of a vanadium pentoxide (V_{2}O_{5}) catalyst, and addition of water to produce sulfuric acid (H_{2}SO_{4}). It is named for the "contact" of the sulfur dioxide and oxygen with the catalyst to enable the production of the sulfur trioxide.

== History ==
This process was patented in 1831 by British vinegar merchant Peregrine Phillips. In addition to being a far more economical process for producing concentrated sulfuric acid than the previous lead chamber process, the contact process also produces sulfur trioxide and oleum.

In 1890 John Brown Francis Herreshoff developed a form of the contact catalytic process for the company of which he was a partner.

Platinum was originally used as the catalyst for this reaction; however, because it is susceptible to reacting with arsenic impurities in the sulfur feedstock, vanadium(V) oxide (V_{2}O_{5}) has been preferred since the 1920's.

In 1901 Eugen de Haën patented the basic process involving combining sulfur dioxide and oxygen in the presence of vanadium oxides, producing sulfur trioxide which was easily absorbed into water, producing sulfuric acid. This process was improved remarkably by shrinking the particle size of the catalyst (e.g. ≤ 5000 microns), a process discovered by two chemists of BASF in 1914.

== Process ==
The process can be divided into four stages:

1. Combining of sulfur and oxygen (O_{2}) to form sulfur dioxide, then purify the sulfur dioxide in a purification unit
2. Adding an excess of oxygen to sulfur dioxide in the presence of the catalyst vanadium pentoxide at 450 °C and 1–2 atm
3. The sulfur trioxide formed is added to sulfuric acid which gives rise to oleum (disulfuric acid)
4. The oleum is then added to water to form sulfuric acid which is very concentrated. Since this process is an exothermic reaction, the reaction temperature should be as low as possible.

Purification of the air and sulfur dioxide (SO_{2}) is necessary to avoid catalyst poisoning (loss of catalytic activity). The gas is then washed with water and dried with sulfuric acid.

To conserve energy, the mixture is heated by exhaust gases from the catalytic converter by heat exchangers.

Sulfur dioxide and dioxygen then react as follows:

2 SO_{2(g)} + O_{2(g)} ⇌ 2 SO_{3(g)} : ΔH = –197 kJ·mol^{−1}

Proposed mechanism for the oxidation of sulfur dioxide over vanadium oxide catalysts

According to Le Chatelier's principle, lower temperatures favor formation of sulfur trioxide, but if the temperature is too low the reaction rate becomes uneconomical. In industrial practice, the oxidation is therefore carried out at about 420 to 620 °C over vanadium(V) oxide-based catalysts, typically around 450 °C, at near-atmospheric pressure. Below this range the catalyst is deactivated by formation of vanadium(IV) compounds, while at higher temperatures it begins to decompose.

The active catalyst phase is not pure solid V_{2}O_{5}, but a molten salt formed from vanadium(V) oxide and added alkali metal sulfates. In this melt, a reactive complex of composition [(VO)_{2}O(SO_{4})_{4}]^{4−} is formed, which is regarded as the actual catalytic species. Oxygen and sulfur dioxide coordinate to this complex and react to form sulfur trioxide without a change in the oxidation state of vanadium. Hot sulfur trioxide passes through the heat exchanger and is dissolved in concentrated H_{2}SO_{4} in the absorption tower to form oleum.

H_{2}SO_{4} + SO_{3} → H_{2}S_{2}O_{7}

Note that directly dissolving SO_{3} in water is impractical due to the highly exothermic nature of the reaction. Acidic vapor or mists are formed instead of a liquid.

Oleum is reacted with water to form concentrated H_{2}SO_{4}.

H_{2}S_{2}O_{7} + H_{2}O → 2 H_{2}SO_{4}

== Purification unit ==
This includes the dusting tower, cooling pipes, scrubbers, drying tower, arsenic purifier and testing box. Sulfur dioxide has many impurities such as vapours, dust particles and arsenous oxide. Therefore, it must be purified to avoid catalyst poisoning. In this process, the gas is washed with water, and dried by sulfuric acid. In the dusting tower, the sulfur dioxide is exposed to a steam which removes the dust particles. After the gas is cooled, the sulfur dioxide enters the washing tower where it is sprayed by water to remove any soluble impurities. In the drying tower, sulfuric acid is sprayed on the gas to remove the moisture from it. Finally, the arsenic oxide is removed when the gas is exposed to ferric hydroxide.

== Double contact double absorption ==
A common modern implementation of the contact process is double contact double absorption (DCDA). In this process the product gases (SO_{2} and SO_{3}) are passed through absorption towers twice to achieve further absorption and conversion of SO_{2} to SO_{3} and production of higher grade sulfuric acid.

SO_{2}-rich gases enter the catalytic converter, usually a tower with multiple catalyst beds, and are converted to SO_{3}, achieving the first stage of conversion. The exit gases from this stage contain both SO_{2} and SO_{3} which are passed through intermediate absorption towers where sulfuric acid is trickled down packed columns and SO_{3} reacts with water increasing the sulfuric acid concentration. Though SO_{2} too passes through the tower it is unreactive and comes out of the absorption tower.

This stream of gas containing SO_{2}, after necessary cooling is passed through the catalytic converter bed column again achieving up to 99.8% conversion of SO_{2} to SO_{3} and the gases are again passed through the final absorption column thus achieving high conversion efficiency for SO_{2}.

The industrial production of sulfuric acid involves proper control of temperatures and flow rates of the gases as both the conversion efficiency and absorption are dependent on these.
