= Hydrogen chloride =

Skeletal formula of hydrogen chloride with a dimension
Space-filling model of hydrogen chloride with atom symbols

Names
- IUPAC name Hydrogen chloride
- Systematic IUPAC name Chlorane
- Other names Anhydrous hydrochloric acid Hydrochloric acid gas Hydrochloric gas Hydrochloride

Identifiers
CAS Number	7647-01-0
3D model (JSmol)	Interactive image
Beilstein Reference	1098214
ChEBI	CHEBI:17883
ChEMBL	ChEMBL1231821
ChemSpider	307
ECHA InfoCard	100.028.723
EC Number	231-595-7
Gmelin Reference	322
KEGG	D02057
MeSH	Hydrochloric+acid
PubChem CID	313
RTECS number	MW4025000
UNII	QTT17582CB
UN number	1050
CompTox Dashboard (EPA)	DTXSID2020711
- InChI: InChI=1S/HCl/h1H Key: VEXZGXHMUGYJMC-UHFFFAOYSA-N; InChI=1/HCl/h1H Key: VEXZGXHMUGYJMC-UHFFFAOYAT
- SMILES: Cl

Properties
Chemical formula	HCl
Molar mass	36.46 g·mol^{-1}
Appearance	Colorless gas
Odor	pungent; sharp and burning
Density	1.49 g/L
Melting point	−114.22 °C (−173.60 °F; 158.93 K)
Boiling point	−85.05 °C (−121.09 °F; 188.10 K)
Solubility in water	823 g/L (0 °C); 720 g/L (20 °C); 561 g/L (60 °C)
Solubility	soluble in methanol, ethanol, ether and water
Vapor pressure	4352 kPa (at 21.1 °C)
Acidity (pK_{a})	−3.0; −5.9 (±0.4)
Basicity (pK_{b})	17.0
Conjugate acid	Chloronium
Conjugate base	Chloride
Refractive index (n_{D})	1.0004456 (gas); 1.254 (liquid)
Viscosity	0.311 cP (−100 °C)

Structure
Molecular shape	linear
Dipole moment	1.05 D

Thermochemistry
Heat capacity (C)	0.7981 J/(K·g)
Std molar entropy (S^{⦵}_{298})	186.902 J/(K·mol)
Std enthalpy of formation (Δ_{f}H^{⦵}_{298})	−92.31 kJ/mol
Std enthalpy of combustion (Δ_{c}H^{⦵}_{298})	−95.31 kJ/mol

Pharmacology
ATC code	A09AB03 (WHO) B05XA13 (WHO)

Hazards
- Occupational safety and health (OHS/OSH)
Main hazards	Toxic, corrosive
- GHS labelling
Pictograms	(GHS05: Corrosive) (GHS06: Toxic)
Signal word	Danger
Hazard statements	H314, H331
Precautionary statements	P261, P280, P303+P361+P353, P304+P340+P310, P305+P351+P338, P410+P403
NFPA 704 (fire diamond)	3 0 1 COR
- Lethal dose or concentration (LD, LC)
LD_{50} (median dose)	238 mg/kg (rat, oral)
LC_{50} (median concentration)	3124 ppm (rat, 1 h); 1108 ppm (mouse, 1 h)
LC_{Lo} (lowest published)	1300 ppm (human, 30 min); 4416 ppm (rabbit, 30 min); 4416 ppm (guinea pig, 30 min); 3000 ppm (human, 5 min)
- NIOSH (US health exposure limits)
PEL (Permissible)	C 5 ppm (7 mg/m^{3})
REL (Recommended)	C 5 ppm (7 mg/m^{3})
IDLH (Immediate danger)	50 ppm

Related compounds
Related compounds	Hydrogen fluoride Hydrogen bromide Hydrogen iodide Hydrogen astatide
- Except where otherwise noted, data are given for materials in their standard state (at 25 °C [77 °F], 100 kPa). verify (what is ?) Infobox references

The compound hydrogen chloride has the chemical formula HCl and as such is a hydrogen halide. At room temperature, it is a colorless gas, which forms white fumes of hydrochloric acid upon contact with atmospheric water vapor. Hydrogen chloride gas and hydrochloric acid are important in technology and industry. Hydrochloric acid, the aqueous solution of hydrogen chloride, is also commonly given the formula HCl.

== Reactions ==
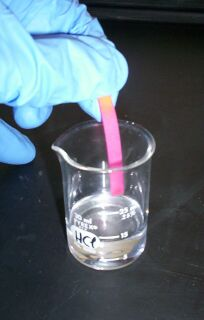
Hydrochloric acid vapor turning pH paper red showing that the fumes are acidic

Hydrogen chloride is a diatomic molecule, consisting of a hydrogen atom H and a chlorine atom Cl connected by a polar covalent bond. The chlorine atom is much more electronegative than the hydrogen atom, which makes this bond polar. Consequently, the molecule has a large dipole moment with a negative partial charge (δ−) at the chlorine atom and a positive partial charge (δ+) at the hydrogen atom. In part because of its high polarity, HCl is very soluble in water (and in other polar solvents).

Upon contact, H_{2}O and HCl combine to form hydronium cations [H_{3}O]^{+} and chloride anions Cl^{−}:

HCl + H_{2}O → [H_{3}O]^{+} + Cl^{−}

The resulting solution is called hydrochloric acid and is a strong acid. The acid dissociation or ionization constant, K_{a}, is large, which means HCl dissociates or ionizes completely in water. Hydrogen chloride also ionizes in other solvents such as methanol:

HCl + CH_{3}OH → [CH_{3}OH_{2}]^{+} + Cl^{−}

In the absence of such polar solvents, hydrogen chloride functions as a weak acid.

=== Structure and properties ===
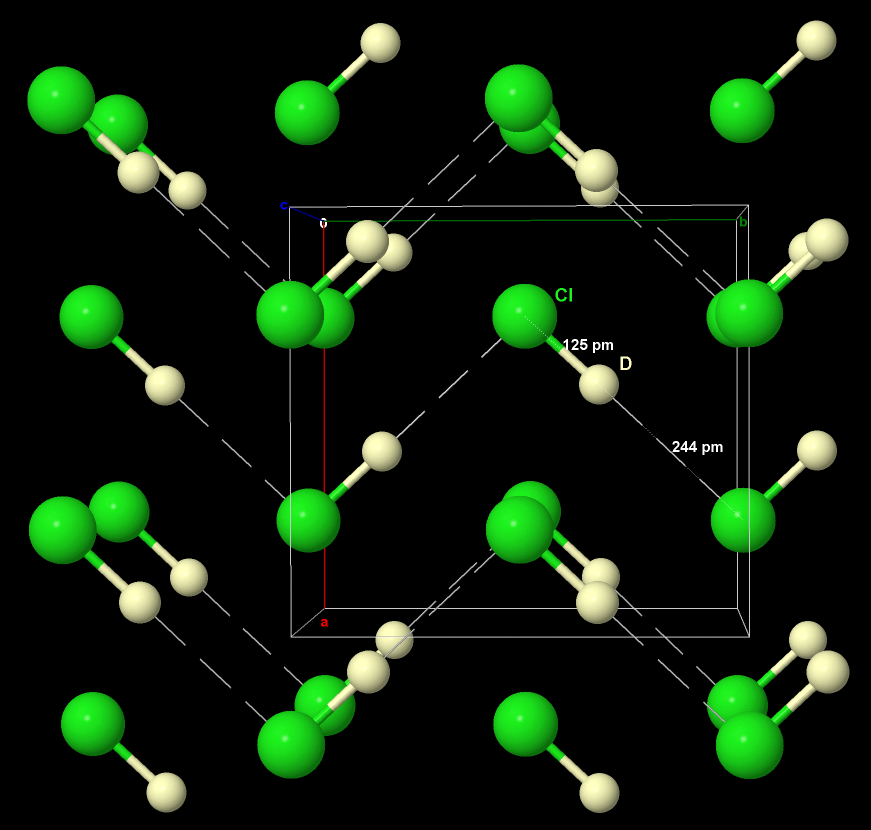
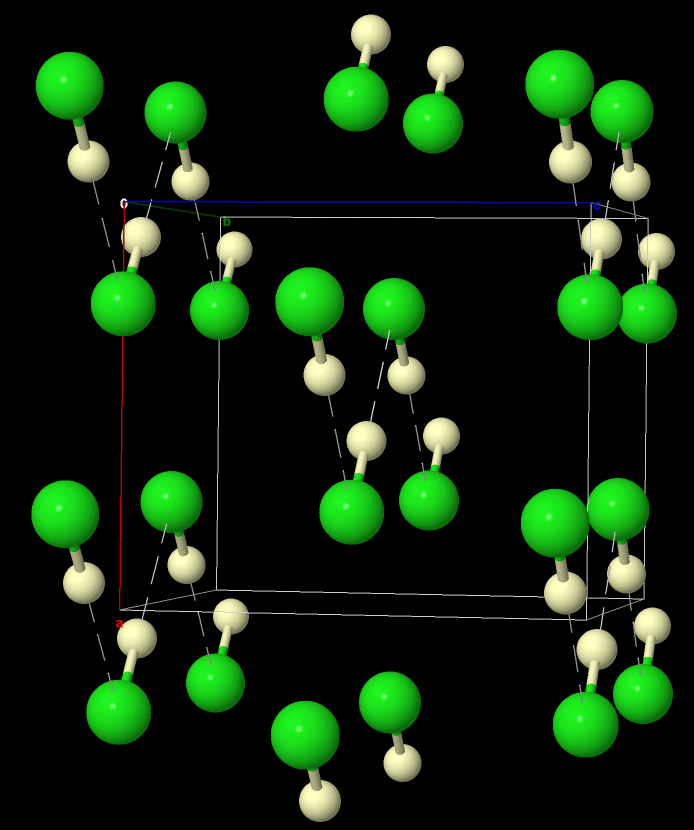
The structure of solid DCl, as determined by neutron diffraction of DCl powder at 77 K. DCl was used instead of HCl because the deuterium nucleus is easier to detect than the hydrogen nucleus. The extended linear structure is indicated by the dashed lines.

Frozen HCl undergoes a phase transition at 98.4 K (−174.8 °C; −282.5 °F). X-ray powder diffraction of the frozen material shows that the material changes from an orthorhombic structure to a cubic one during this transition. In both structures the chlorine atoms are in a face-centered array. However, the hydrogen atoms could not be located. Analysis of spectroscopic and dielectric data, and determination of the structure of DCl (deuterium chloride) indicates that HCl forms zigzag chains in the solid, as does HF (see figure on right).

Solubility of HCl (g/L) in common solvents
Temperature (°C)	0	20	30	50
Water	823	720	673	596
Methanol	513	470	430	
Ethanol	454	410	381	
Ether	356	249	195	

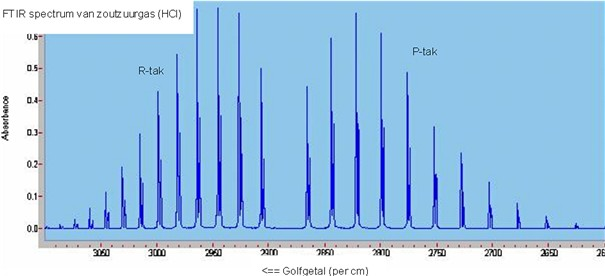
Infrared (IR) absorption spectrum

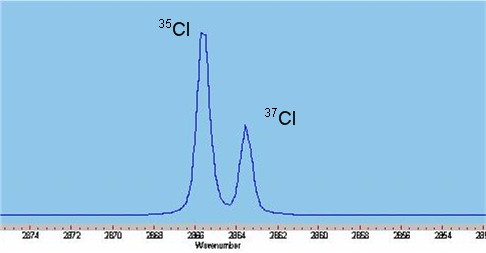
One doublet in the IR spectrum resulting from the isotopic composition of chlorine

The infrared spectrum of gaseous hydrogen chloride, shown on the left, consists of a number of sharp absorption lines grouped around 2886 cm^{−1} (wavelength ~3.47 μm). At room temperature, almost all molecules are in the ground vibrational state v = 0. Including anharmonicity the vibrational energy can be written as:

$$E_\mathrm{v}= h\nu_e\left(v + \tfrac{1}{2}\right)+ hx_e\nu_e\left(v+\tfrac{1}{2}\right)^2$$

To promote an HCl molecule from the v = 0 to the v = 1 state, we would expect to see an infrared absorption about ν_{o} = ν_{e} + 2x_{e}ν_{e} = 2880 cm^{−1}. However, this absorption corresponding to the Q-branch is not observed due to it being forbidden by symmetry. Instead, two sets of signals (P- and R-branches) are seen owing to a simultaneous change in the rotational state of the molecules. Because of quantum mechanical selection rules, only certain rotational transitions are permitted. The states are characterized by the rotational quantum number J = 0, 1, 2, 3, ... selection rules state that ΔJ is only able to take values of ±1.

$$E(J)_\mathrm{rot} = h \cdot B \cdot J(J+1)$$

The value of the rotational constant B is much smaller than the vibrational one ν_{o}, such that a much smaller amount of energy is required to rotate the molecule; for a typical molecule, this lies within the microwave region. However, the vibrational energy of HCl molecule places its absorptions within the infrared region, allowing a spectrum showing the rovibrational transitions of this molecule to be easily collected using an infrared spectrometer with a gas cell. The latter can even be made of quartz as the HCl absorption lies in a window of transparency for this material.

Naturally abundant chlorine consists of two isotopes, ^{35}Cl and ^{37}Cl, in a ratio of approximately 3:1. While the spring constants are nearly identical, the disparate reduced masses of H^{35}Cl and H^{37}Cl cause measurable differences in the rotational energy, thus doublets are observed on close inspection of each absorption line, weighted in the same ratio of 3:1.

== Production ==
=== Historical routes ===
In the 17th century, Johann Rudolf Glauber combined sodium chloride salt and sulfuric acid for the preparation of hydrogen chloride. This route is the basis of the Mannheim process. Joseph Priestley prepared hydrogen chloride in 1772, and by 1808 Humphry Davy had proved that the chemical composition included hydrogen and chlorine.

=== Industrial routes ===
Most hydrogen chloride is produced as a byproduct of chlorination processes. Routes to tetrafluoroethylene, chlorobenzene, CFCs, chloroacetic acid, and vinyl chloride are illustrative. In these routes, formally speaking, hydrogen atoms on the hydrocarbon are replaced by chlorine atoms, whereupon the released hydrogen atom recombines with the spare atom from the chlorine molecule, forming hydrogen chloride:

RH + Cl_{2} → RCl + HCl

Often the resulting hydrogen chloride is integrated with captive use of it on-site, e.g. oxychlorination. Hydrogen chloride is also produced in some routes to organofluorine compounds:

RCl + HF → RF + HCl

Flame inside HCl oven

Hydrogen chloride can be produced by combining chlorine and hydrogen:

Cl_{2} + H_{2} → 2 HCl

As the reaction is exothermic, the installation is called an HCl oven or HCl burner. The resulting hydrogen chloride gas is absorbed in deionized water, resulting in chemically pure hydrochloric acid. This reaction can give a very pure product, e.g. for use in the food industry. The reaction can also be triggered by blue light.

=== Laboratory methods ===
Small amounts of hydrogen chloride for laboratory use can be generated in an HCl generator by dehydrating hydrochloric acid with either sulfuric acid or anhydrous calcium chloride. Alternatively, HCl can be generated by the reaction of sulfuric acid with sodium chloride:

NaCl + H_{2}SO_{4} → NaHSO_{4} + HCl↑

This reaction occurs at room temperature. Provided there is NaCl remaining in the generator and it is heated above 200 °C, the reaction proceeds further:

NaCl + NaHSO_{4} → Na_{2}SO_{4} + HCl↑

For such generators to function, the reagents should be dry.

Hydrogen chloride can also be prepared by the hydrolysis of certain reactive chloride compounds such as phosphorus chlorides, thionyl chloride (SOCl_{2}), and acyl chlorides. For example, cold water can be gradually dripped onto phosphorus pentachloride (PCl_{5}) to give HCl:

PCl_{5} + H_{2}O → POCl_{3} + 2 HCl↑

== Applications ==
Most hydrogen chloride is consumed in the production of hydrochloric acid. It is also used in the production of vinyl chloride and many alkyl chlorides. Trichlorosilane, a precursor to ultrapure silicon, is produced by the reaction of hydrogen chloride and silicon at around 300 °C.

Si + 3 HCl → HSiCl_{3} + H_{2}

== History ==
Around 900, the authors of the Arabic writings attributed to Jabir ibn Hayyan (Latin: Geber) and the Persian physician and alchemist Abu Bakr al-Razi (c. 865–925, Latin: Rhazes) were experimenting with sal ammoniac (ammonium chloride), which when it was distilled together with vitriol (hydrated sulfates of various metals) produced hydrogen chloride. It is possible that in one of his experiments, al-Razi stumbled upon a primitive method to produce hydrochloric acid. However, it appears that in most of these early experiments with chloride salts, the gaseous products were discarded, and hydrogen chloride may have been produced many times before it was discovered that it can be put to chemical use.

One of the first such uses was the synthesis of mercury(II) chloride (corrosive sublimate), whose production from the heating of mercury either with alum and ammonium chloride or with vitriol and sodium chloride was first described in the De aluminibus et salibus ("On Alums and Salts"), an eleventh- or twelfth century Arabic text falsely attributed to Abu Bakr al-Razi and translated into Latin by Gerard of Cremona (1144–1187).

Another important development was the discovery by pseudo-Geber (in the De inventione veritatis, "On the Discovery of Truth", after c. 1300) that by adding ammonium chloride to nitric acid, a strong solvent capable of dissolving gold (i.e., aqua regia) could be produced.

After the discovery in the late sixteenth century of the process by which unmixed hydrochloric acid can be prepared, it was recognized that this new acid (then known as spirit of salt or acidum salis) released vaporous hydrogen chloride, which was called marine acid air. In the 17th century, Johann Rudolf Glauber used salt (sodium chloride) and sulfuric acid for the preparation of sodium sulfate, releasing hydrogen chloride gas (see production, above). In 1772, Carl Wilhelm Scheele also reported this reaction and is sometimes credited with its discovery. Joseph Priestley prepared hydrogen chloride in 1772, and in 1810 Humphry Davy established that it is composed of hydrogen and chlorine.

During the Industrial Revolution, demand for alkaline substances such as soda ash increased, and Nicolas Leblanc developed a new industrial-scale process for producing the soda ash. In the Leblanc process, salt was converted to soda ash, using sulfuric acid, limestone, and coal, giving hydrogen chloride as by-product. Initially, this gas was vented to air, but the Alkali Act 1863 prohibited such release, so then soda ash producers absorbed the HCl waste gas in water, producing hydrochloric acid on an industrial scale. Later, the Hargreaves process was developed, which is similar to the Leblanc process except sulfur dioxide, water, and air are used instead of sulfuric acid in a reaction which is exothermic overall. In the early 20th century the Leblanc process was effectively replaced by the Solvay process, which did not produce HCl. However, hydrogen chloride production continued as a step in hydrochloric acid production.

Historical uses of hydrogen chloride in the 20th century include hydrochlorinations of alkynes in producing the chlorinated monomers chloroprene and vinyl chloride, which are subsequently polymerized to make polychloroprene (Neoprene) and polyvinyl chloride (PVC), respectively. In the production of vinyl chloride, acetylene (C_{2}H_{2}) is hydrochlorinated by adding the HCl across the triple bond of the C_{2}H_{2} molecule, turning the triple into a double bond, yielding vinyl chloride.

The "acetylene process", used until the 1960s for making chloroprene, starts out by joining two acetylene molecules, and then adds HCl to the joined intermediate across the triple bond to convert it to chloroprene as shown here:

This "acetylene process" has been replaced by a process which adds Cl_{2} to the double bond of ethylene instead, and subsequent elimination produces HCl instead, as well as chloroprene.

== Safety ==
Hydrogen chloride forms corrosive hydrochloric acid on contact with water found in body tissue. Inhalation of the fumes can cause coughing, choking, inflammation of the nose, throat, and upper respiratory tract, and in severe cases, pulmonary edema, circulatory system failure, and death. Skin contact can cause redness, pain, and severe chemical burns. Hydrogen chloride may cause severe burns to the eye and permanent eye damage.

The U.S. Occupational Safety and Health Administration and the National Institute for Occupational Safety and Health have established occupational exposure limits for hydrogen chloride at a ceiling of 5 ppm (7 mg/m^{3}), and compiled extensive information on hydrogen chloride workplace safety concerns.

== See also ==
- Gastric acid, hydrochloric acid secreted into the stomach to aid digestion of proteins
- Chloride, salts of hydrogen chloride
- Hydrogen bromide
- Hydrochloride, organic salts of hydrochloric acid
- Hydrochlorination, addition reaction with alkenes
