= Pyrosulfate =

Sulfur dianion

Chemical structure of the disulfate anion

In chemistry, disulfate or pyrosulfate is the anion with the molecular formula S_{2}O_{7}^{2−}. Disulfate is the IUPAC name. It has a dichromate-like structure and can be visualised as two corner-sharing SO_{4}^{−} tetrahedra, with a bridging oxygen atom. In this anion, sulfur has an oxidation state of +6. Disulfate is the conjugate base of the hydrogen disulfate (hydrogen pyrosulfate) ion HS_{2}O_{7}^{−}, which in turn is the conjugate base of disulfuric acid (pyrosulfuric acid).

== Role in sulfation ==
Industrial production of sulfate ester-based surfactants involves the reaction (sulfation) of fatty alcohols with sulfur trioxide. For example, dodecyl alcohol is sulfated using sulfur trioxide. The reaction proceeds by initial formation of the pyrosulfate:

2 SO_{3} + ROH → ROSO_{2}−O−SO_{3}H
ROSO_{2}−O−SO_{3}H → ROSO_{3}H + SO_{3}

Several million tons are produced annually.

== See also ==
- Potassium pyrosulfate
- Sodium pyrosulfate
- Pyrophosphate
- Pyrocarbonate
