= Sodium sulfate (data page) =

Chemical data page

This page provides supplementary chemical data on sodium sulfate.

== Material Safety Data Sheet ==
The handling of this chemical may incur notable safety precautions. It is highly recommend that you seek the Safety Data Sheet (SDS) for this chemical from the manufacturer and follow its directions.

== Structure and properties ==
Structure and properties
Dielectric constant, ε_{r}	anhydrous: 7.90 at r.t. decahydrate: 5.0 at r.t. pentahydrate: 7 at 250-290K
Surface tension	194.8 dyn/cm (194.8 mN/m) (at 900 °C); 184.7 dyn/cm (184.7 mN/m) (at 1077 °C)

== Thermodynamic properties ==
Phase behavior
Solid properties
Entropy change of solution	2.1 J/(mol K)
Liquid properties
Gas properties
Std enthalpy change of formation, Δ_{f}H^{~~o~~}_{gas}	-1033.62 kJ/mol
Standard molar entropy, S^{~~o~~}_{gas}	346.84 J/(mol K)

== Spectral data ==
UV-Vis
IR
Major absorption bands

(nujol mull, nujol pks not listed)
Wave number	transmittance
1124 cm^{−1}	10% (br)
638 cm^{−1}	42%
618 cm^{−1}	35%

NMR

This box:
- Except where noted otherwise, data relate to Standard temperature and pressure.
- Reliability of data general note.
