= Carl Remigius Fresenius =

German chemist (1818–1897)

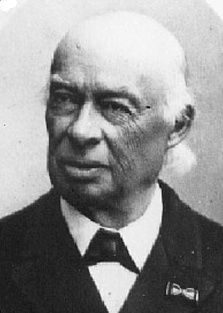
- Carl Remigius Fresenius
- Born: 28 December 1818; Free City of Frankfurt
- Died: 3 May 1897 (aged 78); Wiesbaden, German Empire
- Education: University of Gießen
- Scientific career
- Doctoral advisor: Justus von Liebig
- Doctoral students: Ernst Otto Beckmann

Carl Remigius Fresenius (28 December 1818 – 11 June 1897), was a German chemist, known for his studies in analytical chemistry.

== Biography ==
Fresenius was born on 28 December 1818, in Frankfurt, Germany. After working for some time for a pharmacy in his native town, he entered Bonn University in 1840, and a year later migrated to Gießen, where he acted as assistant in Liebig's laboratory, and in 1843, became an assistant professor.

In 1845, he was appointed to the chair of chemistry, physics and technology at the Wiesbaden Agricultural Institution, and three years later, he became the first director of the chemical laboratory which he induced the Nassau government to establish at that place. Under his leadership and direction, this laboratory continuously increased in size and popularity, a school of pharmacy being added in 1862 (though given up in 1877) and an agricultural research laboratory in 1868.

Apart from his administrative duties, Fresenius occupied himself almost exclusively with analytical chemistry, and the fullness and accuracy of his textbooks on that subject (of which that on qualitative analysis first appeared in 1841 and that on quantitative in 1846) soon rendered them standard works. Many of Fresenius's original papers were published in the Zeitschrift für analytische Chemie, which he founded in 1862 and continued to edit until his death.

Remarkably this journal (also known as Fresenius' Zeitschrift für Analytische Chemie or Fresenius' Journal of Analytical Chemistry and the world's first analytical chemistry journal) had produced 371 volumes, all but one of which had been edited or co-edited by a member of the Fresenius family. Spanning three centuries (1862–2001) the Fresenius' Journal of Analytical Chemistry as it was known came to an end when it became Analytical and Bioanalytical Chemistry, which is still running as of 2021.

In 1881, Fresenius handed over the directorship of the agricultural research station to his son, Remigius Heinrich Fresenius (1847–1920), who was trained under H. Kolbe at Leipzig. Another son, Theodor Wilhelm Fresenius (1856–1936), was educated at Strasbourg and occupied various positions in the Wiesbaden laboratory.

Fresenius died suddenly at Wiesbaden at age 78, on 11 June 1897.

== Works ==
- Neue Verfahrensweisen zur Prüfung der Pottasche und Soda, der Aschen, der Säuren, insbesondere des Essigs, so wie des Braunsteins auf ihren wahren Gehalt und Handelswerth : für Chemiker, Pharmaceuten, Techniker und Kaufleute; lediglich nach eigenen Versuchen bearb. . Winter, Heidelberg 1843 Digital edition by the University and State Library Düsseldorf
- Anleitung zur qualitativen chemischen Analyse oder die Lehre von den Operationen, von den Reagentien und von dem Verhalten der bekannteren Körpern zu Reagentien : für Anfänger und Geübtere . Vieweg, Braunschweig 9th ed. 1856 Digital edition by the University and State Library Düsseldorf
- Anleitung zur quantitativen chemischen Analyse oder die Lehre von der Gewichtsbestimmung und Scheidung der in der Pharmacie, den Künsten, Gewerben und der Landwirtschaft häufiger vorkommenden Körper in einfachen und zusammengesetzten Verbindungen : für Anfänger und Geübtere; mit 190 Holzstichen . Vieweg, Braunschweig 5th ed. 1870 Digital edition by the University and State Library Düsseldorf

== See also ==
- Eugen de Haën
