= Oleum =

Corrosive liquid of excess sulfur trioxide in solution

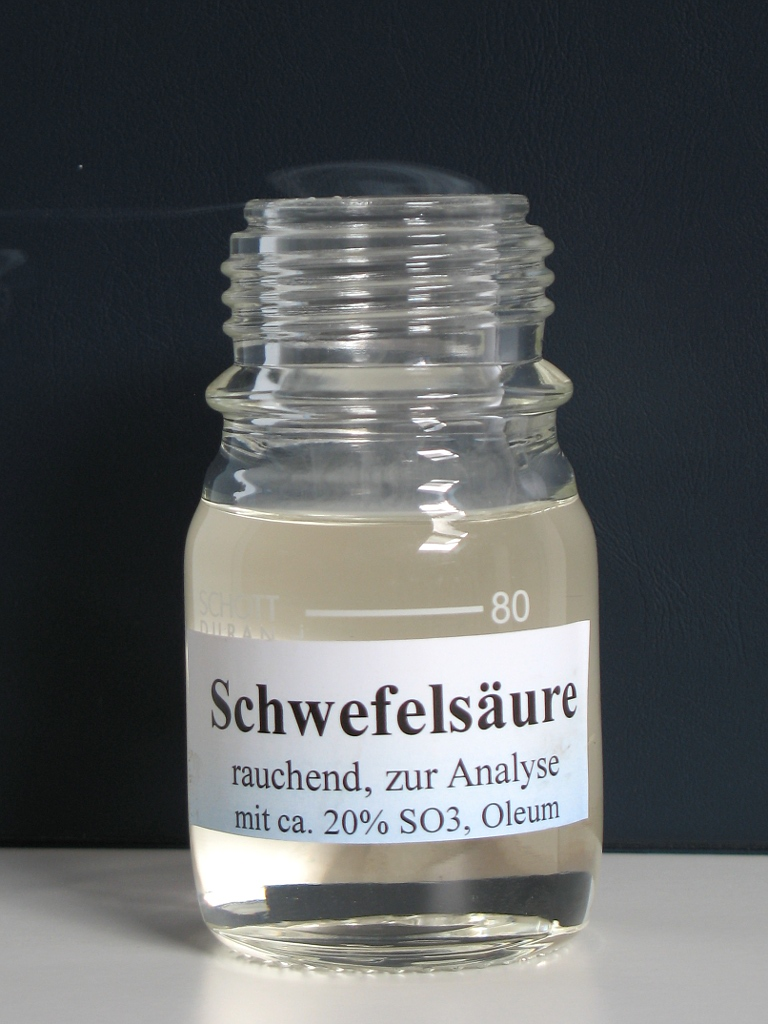
- Oleum fuming in air

Identifiers
CAS Number	8014-95-7
ECHA InfoCard	100.116.872
EC Number	616-954-1
UNII	67PNC7P6RU
CompTox Dashboard (EPA)	DTXSID5064889

Properties
Chemical formula	H_{2}S_{2}O_{7}
Appearance	colorless fuming liquid

Related compounds
Related compounds	sulfuric acid sulfur trioxide
- Except where otherwise noted, data are given for materials in their standard state (at 25 °C [77 °F], 100 kPa). Infobox references

Oleum (Latin oleum, meaning oil), or fuming sulfuric acid, is a term referring to solutions of various compositions of sulfur trioxide in sulfuric acid, or sometimes more specifically to disulfuric acid (also known as pyrosulfuric acid).

Oleums can be described by the formula ySO_{3}·H_{2}O where y is the total molar mass of sulfur trioxide content. The value of y can be varied, to include different oleums. They can also be described by the formula H_{2}SO_{4}·xSO_{3} where x is now defined as the molar free sulfur trioxide content. Oleum is generally assessed according to the free SO_{3} content by mass. It can also be expressed as a percentage of sulfuric acid strength; for oleum concentrations, that would be over 100%. For example, 10% oleum can also be expressed as H_{2}SO_{4}·0.13611SO_{3}, 1.13611SO_{3}·H_{2}O or 102.25% sulfuric acid. The conversion between % acid and % oleum is:

$$\%\,\text{acid} = 100 + \frac{18}{80} \times \%\,\text{oleum}$$

For x = 1 and y = 2 the empirical formula H_{2}S_{2}O_{7} for disulfuric (pyrosulfuric) acid is obtained. Pure disulfuric acid is a solid at room temperature, melting at 36 °C and rarely used either in the laboratory or industrial processes — although some research indicates that pure disulfuric acid has never been isolated yet.

== Production ==
Oleum is produced in the contact process, where sulfur is oxidized to sulfur trioxide which is subsequently dissolved in concentrated sulfuric acid. Sulfuric acid itself is regenerated by dilution of part of the oleum.

The lead chamber process for sulfuric acid production was abandoned, partly because it could not produce sulfur trioxide or concentrated sulfuric acid directly due to corrosion of the lead, and absorption of NO_{2} gas. Until this process was made obsolete by the contact process, oleum had to be obtained through indirect methods. Historically, the biggest production of oleum came from the distillation of iron sulfates at Nordhausen, from which the historical name Nordhausen sulfuric acid is derived.

== Applications ==
=== Sulfuric acid production ===
Oleum is an important intermediate in the manufacture of sulfuric acid due to its high enthalpy of hydration. When SO_{3} is added to water, rather than dissolving, it tends to form a fine mist of sulfuric acid, which is difficult to manage. However, SO_{3} added to concentrated sulfuric acid readily dissolves, forming oleum which can then be diluted with water to produce additional concentrated sulfuric acid.

Typically, above concentrations of 98.3%, sulfuric acid will undergo a spontaneous decomposition into sulfur trioxide and water

H_{2}SO_{4} ⇌ SO_{3} + H_{2}O

This means that sulfuric acid above said concentration will readily degenerate until it reaches 98.3%; this is impractical in some applications such as synthesis where anhydrous conditions are preferred (like alcohol eliminations). Adding sulfur trioxide alters the chemical equilibrium, allowing concentration to be increased beyond 98.3%.

=== As an intermediate for transportation ===
Oleum is a useful form for transporting sulfuric acid compounds, typically in rail tank cars, between oil refineries, which produce various sulfur compounds as a byproduct of refining, and industrial consumers.

Certain compositions of oleum are solid at room temperature, and thus are safer to ship than as a liquid. Solid oleum can be converted into liquid at the destination by steam heating or dilution or concentration. This requires care to prevent overheating and evaporation of sulfur trioxide. To extract it from a tank car requires careful heating using steam conduits inside the tank car. Great care must be taken to avoid overheating, as this can increase the pressure in the tank car beyond the tank's safety valve limit.

In addition, oleum lacks free water to attack surfaces, making it less corrosive to metals. Because of that, sulfuric acid is sometimes concentrated to oleum for in-plant pipelines and then diluted back to acid for use in industrial reactions.

The freezing point of oleum varies strongly and non-monotonically with concentration, and so small shifts in concentration (up or down) can lead to oleum unexpectedly freezing in pipes as temperatures as high as 35 C, or remaining liquid at temperatures as low as 0 C.

In Richmond, California in 1993 a tank car of oleum overheated and released sulfur trioxide, creating a mist of micrometre-sized sulfuric acid particles that spread over a wide area.

=== Organic chemistry research ===
Oleum is a harsh reagent, and is highly corrosive. One important use of oleum as a reagent is the secondary nitration of nitrobenzene. The first nitration can occur with nitric acid in sulfuric acid, but this deactivates the ring towards further electrophilic substitution. A stronger reagent, oleum, is needed to introduce the second nitro group onto the aromatic ring.

=== Explosives manufacture ===
Oleum is used in the manufacture of many explosives with the notable exception of nitrocellulose. (In modern manufacturing of nitrocellulose, the H_{2}SO_{4} concentration is often adjusted using oleum.) The chemical requirements for explosives manufacture often require anhydrous mixtures containing nitric acid and sulfuric acid. Ordinary commercial grade nitric acid consists of the constant boiling azeotrope of nitric acid and water, and contains 68% nitric acid. Mixtures of ordinary nitric acid in sulfuric acid therefore contain substantial amounts of water and are unsuitable for processes such as those that occur in the manufacture of trinitrotoluene.

The synthesis of RDX and certain other explosives does not require oleum.

Anhydrous nitric acid, referred to as white fuming nitric acid, can be used to prepare water-free nitration mixtures, and this method is used in laboratory scale operations where the cost of material is not of primary importance. Fuming nitric acid is hazardous to handle and transport, because it is extremely corrosive and volatile. For industrial use, such strong nitration mixtures are prepared by mixing oleum with ordinary commercial nitric acid so that the free sulfur trioxide in the oleum consumes the water in the nitric acid.

== Carbon snake ==
Like concentrated sulfuric acid, oleum is such a strong dehydrating agent that if poured onto powdered glucose, or virtually any other sugar, it will draw the hydrogen elements of water out of the sugar in an exothermic reaction, leaving a residue of nearly pure carbon as a solid. This carbon expands outward, hardening as a solid black substance with gas bubbles in it. This reaction, often dubbed a carbon snake, is sometimes used as a chemistry classroom experiment.
