= Eugen de Haën =

German chemist and entrepreneur (1835–1911)

Carl Johann Eugen de Haën
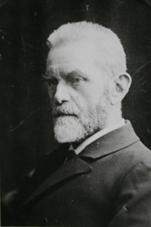
- Born: 26 December 1835; Duisburg, Germany
- Died: 16 November 1911 (aged 75); Hanover, Germany
- Education: Heidelberg University
- Known for: founder of the E. de Haën chemicals factory
- Scientific career
- Doctoral advisor: Gustav Kirchhoff; Robert Bunsen; Gustav Leonhardt
- Other academic advisors: Carl Remigius Fresenius

Carl Johann Eugen de Haën (December 26, 1835 – November 16, 1911), often known as Eugen de Haën or Eugen de Haen, was a German chemist and entrepreneur. He was founder of the chemistry factory E. de Haën & Co.

== Education and career ==
De Haën studied in Heidelberg University under the supervision of Gustav Kirchhoff in physics, Robert Bunsen in chemistry and Gustav Leonhardt in mineralogy, receiving a PhD in 1856. Afterwards, he worked in several chemical factories. At the Silesia Verein Chemischer Fabriken in Saarau (Lower Silesia), Eugen de Haën became involved in 1860 in the chemical laboratory of Julius Knoevenagel (1832 – 1914) in Linden near Hanover, with whom he initially founded the small Chemische Fabrik Dr. Eugen de Haen & Cie in 1861. at Falkenstrasse 9.

In 1861, he founded the E. de Haën company in Linden and later in List, two small villages close to Hanover. The railway and the possibility to have access to the Mittellandkanal he changed the location of his company to Seelze east of Hanover in 1902.

As early as 1862, he moved to List, a suburb of Hanover, where he produced high-purity salts and oxides in the larger E. de Haen Chemische Fabrik List GmbH. Due to the upswing after 1870/1871, the company expanded in Fabrikstrasse, later renamed Liebig Strasse. The laboratory was headed by Johannes Skalweit as a young university graduate. In 1886, on its 25th anniversary, the company has already employed 170 people.

Hanover's residential development in the immediate vicinity was growing rapidly but there was no rail connection. Therefore, the company had to look for a new location and finally found one at a favorable price in a 120-acre site with good rail connections in the village of Seelze. In 1902, the company relocated to Seelze. The old company site was transferred to the descendants in the course of the early succession and was finally demolished at the expense of the heirs. All development costs for the future building land contractually concerned the heirs, and the "construction of an ornamental and playground" was therefore dedicated to the benefactor as de Haën Square.

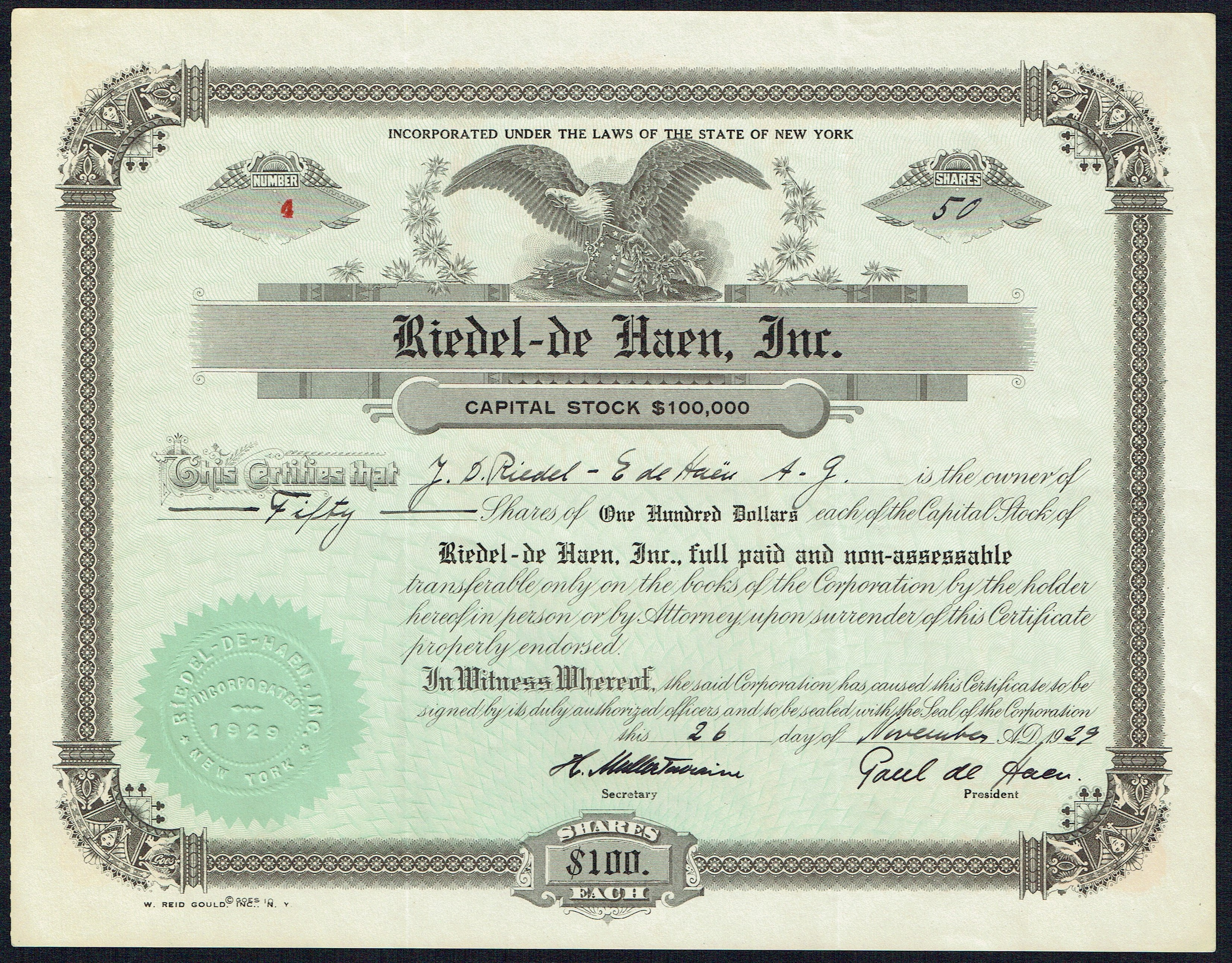
Share of the american subsidiary Riedel-de Haen, Inc., issued 26 November 1929

After significant expansion the company, J. D. Riedel bought the company in 1926 and changed the name of the combined companies to Riedel-de Haën. The company changed owners several times in his long history, but chemicals are still produced in Seelze.

== Timeline of de Haën's chemical factory ==
- In 1911, the E. de Haen Chemische Fabrik List GmbH in Seelze carried more than 10,000 products. One specialty was the production of hydrofluoric acid from fluorspar and oleum until today. In 1911, his eldest son Dr. Wilhelm de Haën (186? – 1939) took over the management of the company. Under him, it was renamed a family limited liability company in 1912.
- In 1922, the company became a joint stock company, but as early as 1923, the chemical-pharmaceutical factory J.D. Riedel AG acquired all shares in Eugen de Haën Aktiengesellschaft for 40 million paper marks at the height of the inflation.
- In 1928, the two chemical companies were merged to form J. D. Riedel - E. de Haën AG, headquartered in Berlin.
- During World War II, numerous forced laborers and prisoners of war were used at de Haën in Seelze.
- In 1943, the company was given its current name Riedel-de Haën AG. Due to bomb damage during World War II, the company's headquarters were moved from Berlin-Britz to Seelze near Hanover in 1948.
- In 1955, the majority of shares were acquired by Cassella Farbwerke Mainkur in Frankfurt am Main. Through rationalization and production expansion, the Seelze plant became the main plant of Riedel-de Haën AG.
- In 1995 the company was split, the laboratory chemicals division was sold to Sigma-Aldrich, the industrial chemicals division to Honeywell.

== See also ==
- Honeywell
- Hoechst AG
- Carl Remigius Fresenius
