= Sodium sulfate =

Chemical compound with formula Na2SO4

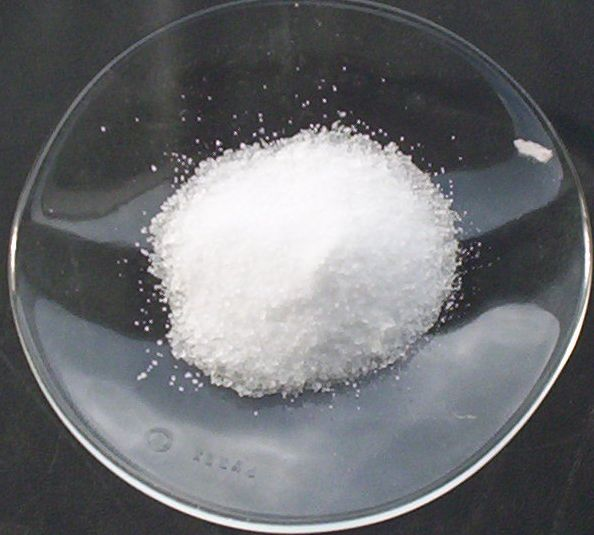

Names
- IUPAC name Sodium sulfate
- Other names: Sodium sulphate; Disodium sulfate; Sulfate of sodium; Thénardite (anhydrous mineral); Glauber's salt (decahydrate); Sal mirabilis (decahydrate); Mirabilite (decahydrate mineral)

Identifiers
CAS Number	7757-82-6; 7727-73-3 (decahydrate)
3D model (JSmol)	Interactive image
ChEBI	CHEBI:32149
ChEMBL	ChEMBL233406
ChemSpider	22844
ECHA InfoCard	100.028.928
E number	E514(i) (acidity regulators, ...)
PubChem CID	24436
RTECS number	WE1650000
UNII	36KCS0R750; 0YPR65R21J (decahydrate
CompTox Dashboard (EPA)	DTXSID1021291
- InChI: InChI=1S/2Na.H2O4S/c;;1-5(2,3)4/h;;(H2,1,2,3,4)/q2*+1;/p-2 Key: PMZURENOXWZQFD-UHFFFAOYSA-L; InChI=1S/2Na.H2O4S/c;;1-5(2,3)4/h;;(H2,1,2,3,4)/q2*+1;/p-2; InChI=1S/2Na.H2O4S/c;;1-5(2,3)4/h;;(H2,1,2,3,4)/q2*+1;/p-2 Key: PMZURENOXWZQFD-UHFFFAOYSA-L
- SMILES: [Na+].[Na+].[O-]S([O-])(=O)=O

Properties
Chemical formula	Na_{2}SO_{4}
Molar mass	142.04 g/mol (anhydrous); 322.20 g/mol (decahydrate)
Appearance	white crystalline solid, hygroscopic
Odor	odorless
Density	2.664 g/cm^{3} (anhydrous); 1.464 g/cm^{3} (decahydrate)
Melting point	884 °C (1,623 °F; 1,157 K) (anhydrous); 32.38 °C (decahydrate)
Boiling point	1,429 °C (2,604 °F; 1,702 K) (anhydrous)
Solubility in water	anhydrous: 4.76 g/100 mL (0 °C); 28.1 g/100 mL (25 °C); 49.7 g/100 mL (32.384 °C); 42.7 g/100 mL (100 °C) heptahydrate: 19.5 g/100 mL (0 °C); 44 g/100 mL (20 °C)
Solubility	insoluble in ethanol soluble in glycerol, water, and hydrogen iodide
Magnetic susceptibility (χ)	−52.0·10^{−6} cm^{3}/mol (anhydrous), −184·10^{−6} cm^{3}/mol (decahydrate)
Refractive index (n_{D})	1.468 (anhydrous); 1.394 (decahydrate)

Structure
Crystal structure	orthorhombic (anhydrous) monoclinic (decahydrate)

Thermochemistry
Heat capacity (C)	128.2 J/(mol K)
Std molar entropy (S^{⦵}_{298})	149.6 J/(mol K)
Std enthalpy of formation (Δ_{f}H^{⦵}_{298})	−1387.1 kJ/mol
Enthalpy of fusion (Δ_{f}H^{⦵}_{fus})	200.8 kJ/mol

Pharmacology
ATC code	A06AD13 (WHO) A12CA02 (WHO)

Hazards
- Occupational safety and health (OHS/OSH)
Main hazards	Irritant
NFPA 704 (fire diamond)	1 0 0
Flash point	Non-flammable
Safety data sheet (SDS)	ICSC 0952

Related compounds
Other anions	Sodium selenate; Sodium tellurate
Other cations	Lithium sulfate; Potassium sulfate; Rubidium sulfate; Caesium sulfate
Related compounds	Sodium bisulfate; Sodium sulfite; Sodium persulfate; Sodium pyrosulfate

Supplementary data page
- Sodium sulfate (data page)
- Except where otherwise noted, data are given for materials in their standard state (at 25 °C [77 °F], 100 kPa). verify (what is ?) Infobox references

Sodium sulfate (also known as sodium sulphate or sulfate of soda) is the inorganic compound with formula Na_{2}SO_{4} as well as several related hydrates. All forms are white solids that are highly soluble in water. With an annual production of 6 million tonnes, the decahydrate is a major commodity chemical product. It is mainly used as a filler in the manufacture of powdered home laundry detergents and in the Kraft process of paper pulping for making highly alkaline sulfides.

== Forms ==
- Anhydrous sodium sulfate, known as the rare mineral thénardite, used as a drying agent in organic synthesis.
- Heptahydrate sodium sulfate, a very rare form.
- Decahydrate sodium sulfate, known as the mineral mirabilite, widely used by chemical industry. It is also known as Glauber's salt.

== History ==
The decahydrate of sodium sulfate is known as Glauber's salt after the Dutch–German chemist and apothecary Johann Rudolf Glauber (1604–1670), who discovered it in Austrian spring water in 1625. He named it sal mirabilis (miraculous salt), because of its medicinal properties: the crystals were used as a general-purpose laxative, until more sophisticated alternatives came about in the 1900s. However, J. Kunckel later alleged that it was known as a secret medicine in Saxony already in the mid-16th century.

In the 18th century, Glauber's salt began to be used as a raw material for the industrial production of soda ash (sodium carbonate), by reaction with potash (potassium carbonate). Demand for soda ash increased, and the supply of sodium sulfate had to increase in line. Therefore, in the 19th century, the large-scale Leblanc process, producing synthetic sodium sulfate as a key intermediate, became the principal method of soda-ash production.

== Chemical properties ==
Sodium sulfate is a typical electrostatically bonded ionic sulfate. The existence of free sulfate ions in solution is indicated by the easy formation of insoluble sulfates when these solutions are treated with Ba^{2+} or Pb^{2+} salts:

Na_{2}SO_{4} + BaCl_{2} → 2 NaCl + BaSO_{4}

Sodium sulfate is unreactive toward most oxidizing or reducing agents. At high temperatures, it can be converted to sodium sulfide by carbothermal reduction (aka thermo-chemical sulfate reduction (TSR), high temperature heating with charcoal, etc.):

Na_{2}SO_{4} + 2 C → Na_{2}S + 2 CO_{2}

This reaction was employed in the Leblanc process, a defunct industrial route to sodium carbonate.

Sodium sulfate reacts with sulfuric acid to give the acid salt sodium bisulfate:

Na_{2}SO_{4} + H_{2}SO_{4} ⇌ 2 NaHSO_{4}

Sodium sulfate displays a moderate tendency to form double salts. The only alums formed with common trivalent metals are NaAl(SO_{4})_{2} (unstable above 39 °C) and NaCr(SO_{4})_{2}, in contrast to potassium sulfate and ammonium sulfate which form many stable alums. Double salts with some other alkali metal sulfates are known, including Na_{2}SO_{4}·3K_{2}SO_{4} which occurs naturally as the mineral aphthitalite. Formation of glaserite by reaction of sodium sulfate with potassium chloride has been used as the basis of a method for producing potassium sulfate, a fertiliser. Other double salts include 3Na_{2}SO_{4}·CaSO_{4}, 3Na_{2}SO_{4}·MgSO_{4} (vanthoffite) and NaF·Na_{2}SO_{4}.

== Physical properties ==
Sodium sulfate has unusual solubility characteristics in water. Its solubility in water rises more than tenfold between 0 °C and 32.384 °C, where it reaches a maximum of 49.7 g/100 mL. At this point the solubility curve changes slope, and the solubility becomes almost independent of temperature. This temperature of 32.384 °C, corresponding to the release of crystal water and melting of the hydrated salt, serves as an accurate temperature reference for thermometer calibration.

Temperature dependence of Na_{2}SO_{4} solubility in water

== Structure ==
Crystals of the decahydrate consist of [Na(H_{2}O)_{6}]^{+} ions with octahedral molecular geometry. These octahedra share edges such that 8 of the 10 water molecules are bound to sodium and 2 others are interstitial, being hydrogen-bonded to sulfate. These cations are linked to the sulfate anions by hydrogen bonds. The Na–O distances are about 240 pm. Crystalline sodium sulfate decahydrate is also unusual among hydrated salts in having a measurable residual entropy (entropy at absolute zero) of 6.32 J/(K·mol). This is ascribed to its ability to distribute water much more rapidly compared to most hydrates.

== Production ==
The world production of sodium sulfate, almost exclusively in the form of the decahydrate, amounts to approximately 5.5 to 6 million tonnes annually (Mt/a). In 1985, production was 4.5 Mt/a, half from natural sources, and half from chemical production. After 2000, at a stable level until 2006, natural production had increased to 4 Mt/a, and chemical production decreased to 1.5 to 2 Mt/a, with a total of 5.5 to 6 Mt/a. For all applications, naturally produced and chemically produced sodium sulfate are practically interchangeable.

=== Natural sources ===
Two thirds of the world's production of the decahydrate (Glauber's salt) is from the natural mineral form mirabilite, for example as found in lake beds in southern Saskatchewan. In 1990, Mexico and Spain were the world's main producers of natural sodium sulfate (each around 500,000 tonnes), with Russia, United States, and Canada around 350,000 tonnes each. Natural resources are estimated at over 1 billion tonnes.

Major producers of 200,000 to 1,500,000 tonnes/year in 2006 included Searles Valley Minerals (California, US), Airborne Industrial Minerals (Saskatchewan, Canada), Química del Rey (Coahuila, Mexico), Minera de Santa Marta and Criaderos Minerales Y Derivados, also known as Grupo Crimidesa (Burgos, Spain), Minera de Santa Marta (Toledo, Spain), Sulquisa (Madrid, Spain), Chengdu Sanlian Tianquan Chemical (Tianquan County, Sichuan, China), Hongze Yinzhu Chemical Group (Hongze District, Jiangsu, China), Nafine Chemical Industry Group (Shanxi, China), Sichuan Province Chuanmei Mirabilite (万胜镇, Dongpo District, Meishan, Sichuan, China), and Kuchuksulphat JSC (Altai Krai, Siberia, Russia).

Anhydrous sodium sulfate occurs in arid environments as the mineral thénardite. It slowly turns to mirabilite in damp air. Sodium sulfate is also found as glauberite, a calcium sodium sulfate mineral. Both minerals are less common than mirabilite.

=== Chemical industry ===
About one third of the world's sodium sulfate is produced as by-product of other processes in chemical industry. Most of this production is chemically inherent to the primary process, and only marginally economical. By effort of the industry, therefore, sodium sulfate production as by-product is declining.

The most important chemical sodium sulfate production is during hydrochloric acid production, either from sodium chloride (salt) and sulfuric acid, in the Mannheim process, or from sulfur dioxide in the Hargreaves process. The resulting sodium sulfate from these processes is known as salt cake.

Mannheim: 2 NaCl + H_{2}SO_{4} → 2 HCl + Na_{2}SO_{4}
Hargreaves: 4 NaCl + 2 SO_{2} + O_{2} + 2 H_{2}O → 4 HCl + 2 Na_{2}SO_{4}

The second major production of sodium sulfate are the processes where surplus sodium hydroxide is neutralised by sulfuric acid to obtain sulfate (SO_{4}^{2−}) by using copper sulfate (CuSO_{4}) (as historically applied on a large scale in the production of rayon by using copper(II) hydroxide). This method is also a regularly applied and convenient laboratory preparation.

2 NaOH(aq) + H_{2}SO_{4}(aq) → Na_{2}SO_{4}(aq) + 2 H_{2}O(l) ΔH = -112.5 kJ (highly exothermic)

In the laboratory it can also be synthesized from the reaction between sodium bicarbonate and magnesium sulfate, by precipitating magnesium carbonate.

2 NaHCO_{3} + MgSO_{4} → Na_{2}SO_{4} + MgCO_{3} + CO_{2} + H_{2}O

However, as commercial sources are readily available, laboratory synthesis is not practised often. Formerly, sodium sulfate was also a by-product of the manufacture of sodium dichromate, where sulfuric acid is added to sodium chromate solution forming sodium dichromate, or subsequently chromic acid. Alternatively, sodium sulfate is or was formed in the production of lithium carbonate, chelating agents, resorcinol, ascorbic acid, silica pigments, nitric acid, and phenol.

Bulk sodium sulfate is usually purified via the decahydrate form, since the anhydrous form tends to attract iron compounds and organic compounds. The anhydrous form is easily produced from the hydrated form by gentle warming.

Major sodium sulfate by-product producers of 50–80 Mt/a in 2006 include Elementis Chromium (chromium industry, Castle Hayne, NC, US), Lenzing AG (200 Mt/a, rayon industry, Lenzing, Austria), Addiseo (formerly Rhodia, methionine industry, Les Roches-Roussillon, France), Elementis (chromium industry, Stockton-on-Tees, UK), Shikoku Chemicals (Tokushima, Japan) and Visko-R (rayon industry, Russia).

== Applications ==
Sodium sulfate used to dry an organic liquid. Here clumps form, indicating the presence of water in the organic liquid.

By further application of sodium sulfate the liquid may be brought to dryness, indicated here by the absence of clumping.

=== Commodity industries ===
With US pricing at $30 per tonne in 1970, up to $90 per tonne for salt cake quality, and $130 for better grades, sodium sulfate is a very cheap material. The largest use is as filler in powdered home laundry detergents, consuming approximately 50% of world production. This use is waning as domestic consumers are increasingly switching to compact or liquid detergents that do not include sodium sulfate.

=== Papermaking ===
Another formerly major use for sodium sulfate, notably in the US and Canada, is in the Kraft process for the manufacture of wood pulp. Organics present in the "black liquor" from this process are burnt to produce heat, needed to drive the reduction of sodium sulfate to sodium sulfide. However, due to advances in the thermal efficiency of the Kraft recovery process in the early 1960s, more efficient sulfur recovery was achieved and the need for sodium sulfate makeup was drastically reduced. Hence, the use of sodium sulfate in the US and Canadian pulp industry declined from 1,400,000 tonnes per year in 1970 to only approx. 150,000 tonnes in 2006.

=== Glassmaking ===
The glass industry provides another significant application for sodium sulfate, as second largest application in Europe. Sodium sulfate is used as a fining agent, to help remove small air bubbles from molten glass. It fluxes the glass, and prevents scum formation of the glass melt during refining. The glass industry in Europe has been consuming from 1970 to 2006 a stable 110,000 tonnes annually.

=== Textiles ===
Sodium sulfate is important in the manufacture of textiles, particularly in Japan, where this is the largest application. Sodium sulfate is added to increase the ionic strength of the solution and so helps in "levelling", i.e. reducing negative electrical charges on textile fibres, so that dyes can penetrate evenly (see the theory of the diffuse double layer (DDL) elaborated by Gouy and Chapman). Unlike the alternative sodium chloride, it does not corrode the stainless steel vessels used in dyeing. This application in Japan and US consumed in 2006 approximately 100,000 tonnes.

=== Food industry ===
Sodium sulfate is used as a diluent for food colours. It is known as E number additive E514.

=== Heat storage ===
The high heat-storage capacity in the phase change from solid to liquid, and the advantageous phase change temperature of 32 °C (90 °F) makes this material especially appropriate for storing low-grade solar heat for later release in space heating applications. In some applications the material is incorporated into thermal tiles that are placed in an attic space, while in other applications, the salt is incorporated into cells surrounded by solar–heated water. The phase change allows a substantial reduction in the mass of the material required for effective heat storage (the heat of fusion of sodium sulfate decahydrate is 82 kJ/mol or 252 kJ/kg), with the further advantage of a consistency of temperature as long as sufficient material in the appropriate phase is available.

For cooling applications, a mixture with common sodium chloride salt (NaCl) lowers the melting point to 18 °C (64 °F). The heat of fusion of NaCl·Na_{2}SO_{4}·10H_{2}O, is actually increased slightly to 286 kJ/kg.

=== Small-scale applications ===
In the laboratory, anhydrous sodium sulfate is widely used as an inert drying agent, for removing traces of water from organic solutions. It is more efficient, but slower-acting, than the similar agent magnesium sulfate. It is only effective below about 30 °C (86 °F), but it can be used with a variety of materials since it is chemically fairly inert. Sodium sulfate is added to the solution until the crystals no longer clump together; the two video clips (see above) demonstrate how the crystals clump when still wet, but some crystals flow freely once a sample is dry.

Glauber's salt, the decahydrate, is used as a laxative. It is effective for the removal of certain drugs, such as paracetamol (acetaminophen) from the body; thus it can be used after an overdose.

In 1953, sodium sulfate was proposed for heat storage in passive solar heating systems. This takes advantage of its unusual solubility properties, and the high heat of crystallisation (78.2 kJ/mol).

Other uses for sodium sulfate include de-frosting windows, starch manufacture, as an additive in carpet fresheners, and as an additive to cattle feed.

At least one company, Thermaltake, makes a laptop computer chill mat (iXoft Notebook Cooler) using sodium sulfate decahydrate inside a quilted plastic pad. The material slowly turns to liquid and recirculates, equalizing laptop temperature and acting as an insulation.

== Safety ==
Although sodium sulfate is generally regarded as non-toxic, it should be handled with care. The dust can cause temporary asthma or eye irritation; this risk can be prevented by using eye protection and a paper mask. Transport is not limited, and no Risk Phrase or Safety Phrase applies.
