= Rubidium sulfate =

Names
- IUPAC name Rubidium sulfate

Identifiers
CAS Number	7488-54-2
3D model (JSmol)	Interactive image
ChemSpider	170686
ECHA InfoCard	100.028.456
EC Number	231-301-7
PubChem CID	197088
CompTox Dashboard (EPA)	DTXSID80889577
- InChI: InChI=1S/H2O4S.2Rb/c1-5(2,3)4;;/h(H2,1,2,3,4);;/q;2*+1/p-2 Key: GANPIEKBSASAOC-UHFFFAOYSA-L
- SMILES: [O-]S(=O)(=O)[O-].[Rb+].[Rb+]

Properties
Chemical formula	Rb_{2}SO_{4}
Molar mass	266.99 g·mol^{−1}
Appearance	white
Density	3.613 g/cm^{3}
Melting point	1,050 °C (1,920 °F; 1,320 K)
Boiling point	1,700 °C (3,090 °F; 1,970 K)
Solubility in water	36.4 g/mL (0 °C); 50.8 g/mL (25 °C); 81.8 g/mL (100 °C)
Refractive index (n_{D})	1.513

Hazards
- GHS labelling
Pictograms	(GHS07: Exclamation mark)
Signal word	Warning
Hazard statements	H315, H319
Precautionary statements	P264, P280, P302+P352, P305+P351+P338, P321, P332+P313, P337+P313, P362

Related compounds
Related compounds	Rubidium hydrogen sulfate
- Except where otherwise noted, data are given for materials in their standard state (at 25 °C [77 °F], 100 kPa). Infobox references

Rubidium sulfate is a sulfate of rubidium with the chemical formula Rb_{2}SO_{4}.

== Reactions ==
Rubidium sulfate reacts with yttrium(III) sulfate forming a double salt:

Y_{2}(SO_{4})_{3} + Rb_{2}SO_{4} → Rb_{3}[Y(SO_{4})_{3}]

Rubidium sulfate reacts with sulfuric acid forming rubidium hydrogen sulfate, the acid sulfate:

Rb_{2}SO_{4} + H_{2}SO_{4} → 2 RbHSO_{4}
