= Potassium pyrosulfate =

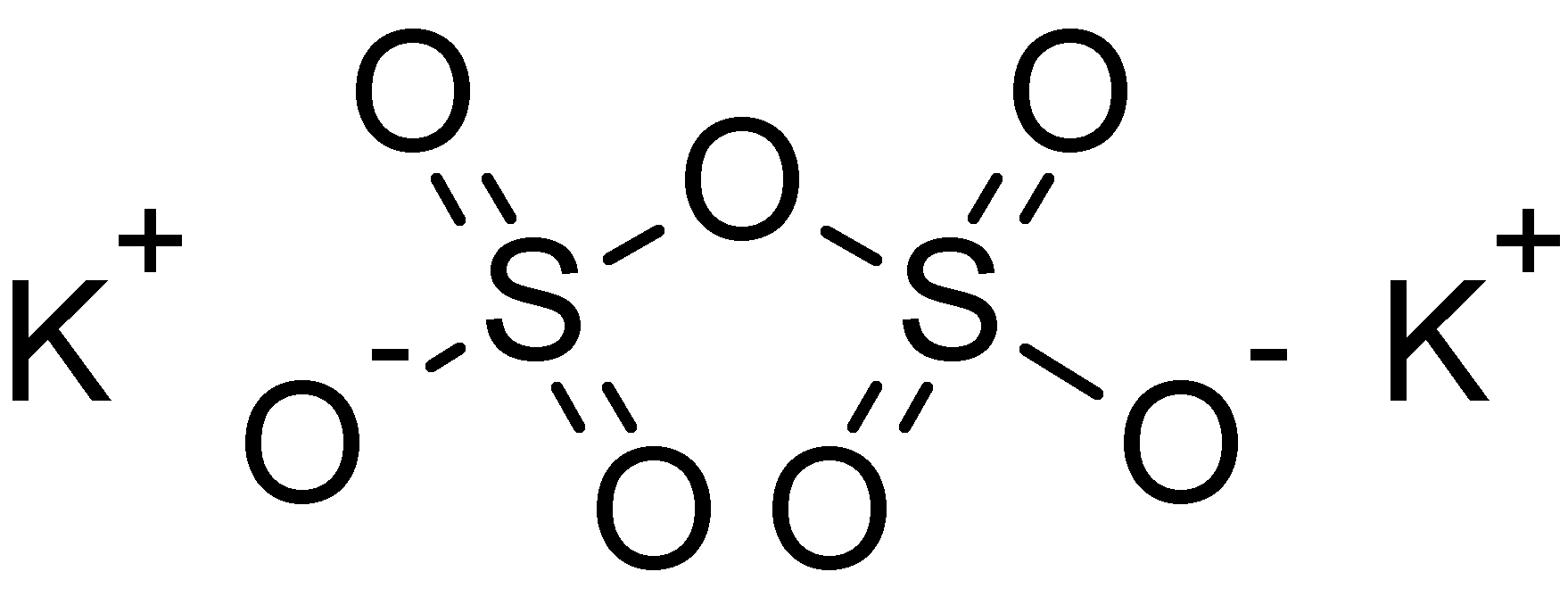

Names
- IUPAC name dipotassium (sulfonatooxy)sulfonate
- Other names Potassium pyrosulphate; potassium disulfate

Identifiers
CAS Number	7790-62-7
3D model (JSmol)	Interactive image
ChemSpider	56432
ECHA InfoCard	100.029.288
EC Number	232-216-8
PubChem CID	62681
UNII	AVJ6ZST7L6
CompTox Dashboard (EPA)	DTXSID10889580
- InChI: InChI=1S/2K.H2O7S2/c;;1-8(2,3)7-9(4,5)6/h;;(H,1,2,3)(H,4,5,6)/q2*+1;/p-2 Key: KAQHZJVQFBJKCK-UHFFFAOYSA-L; InChI=1/2K.H2O7S2/c;;1-8(2,3)7-9(4,5)6/h;;(H,1,2,3)(H,4,5,6)/q2*+1;/p-2 Key: KAQHZJVQFBJKCK-NUQVWONBAQ
- SMILES: [O-]S(=O)(=O)OS(=O)(=O)[O-].[K+].[K+]

Properties
Chemical formula	K_{2}O_{7}S_{2}
Molar mass	254.31 g·mol^{−1}
Density	2.28 g/cm^{3}
Melting point	325 °C (617 °F; 598 K)
Solubility in water	25.4 g/100 mL (20 °C)

Hazards
- GHS labelling
Pictograms	(GHS05: Corrosive) (GHS06: Toxic)
Signal word	Danger
Hazard statements	H314, H331
Precautionary statements	P260, P264, P271, P280, P301+P330+P331, P303+P361+P353, P304+P340, P305+P351+P338, P310, P311, P321, P363, P403+P233, P405, P501
- Except where otherwise noted, data are given for materials in their standard state (at 25 °C [77 °F], 100 kPa). verify (what is ?) Infobox references

Potassium pyrosulfate, or potassium disulfate, is an inorganic compound with the chemical formula K_{2}S_{2}O_{7}.

== Production ==
Potassium pyrosulfate is obtained by the thermal decomposition of other salts, most directly from potassium bisulfate:

2 KHSO_{4} → K_{2}S_{2}O_{7} + H_{2}O

Temperatures above 600 °C further decompose potassium pyrosulfate to potassium sulfate and sulfur trioxide however:

K_{2}S_{2}O_{7} → K_{2}SO_{4} + SO_{3}

Other salts, such as potassium trisulfate, can also decompose into potassium pyrosulfate.

== Chemical structure ==
Potassium pyrosulfate contains the pyrosulfate anion which has a dichromate-like structure. The geometry can be visualized as a tetrahedron with two corners sharing the SO_{4}^{2−} anion's configuration and a centrally bridged oxygen atom. A semi-structural formula for the pyrosulfate anion is O_{3}SOSO_{3}^{2−}. The oxidation state of sulfur in this compound is +6.

== Uses ==
Potassium pyrosulfate is used in analytical chemistry; samples are fused with potassium pyrosulfate, (or a mixture of potassium pyrosulfate and potassium fluoride) to ensure complete dissolution prior to a quantitative analysis.

The compound is also present in a catalyst in conjunction with vanadium(V) oxide in the industrial production of sulfur trioxide.

== See also ==
- Sodium pyrosulfate
