= Mannheim process =

Industrial process

- Process type: Chemical
- Industrial sector(s): Chlor-Alkali industry
- Feedstock: Sodium chloride, sulfuric acid
- Product(s): Hydrogen chloride, sodium sulfate

The Mannheim process is an industrial process for the production of hydrogen chloride and sodium sulfate from sulfuric acid and sodium chloride. The Mannheim furnace is also used to produce potassium sulfate from potassium chloride. The Mannheim process is a stage in the Leblanc process for the production of sodium carbonate.

== Process ==
The process is named after Mannheim furnace, a large cast iron kiln in which it is conducted. The furnace was developed at Verein Chemischer Fabriken in Mannheim at the turn of the 20th century and superseded earlier furnace designs formerly used for the same purpose.

Sodium chloride and sulfuric acid are first fed onto a stationary reaction plate where an initial reaction takes place. The stationary plate is up to 6 m (20 ft) in diameter. Rotating rabble arms constantly turn over the mixture and move the intermediate product to a lower plate. The kiln portion of the furnace is constructed with bricks that have high resistance to direct flame, temperature, and acid. The other parts of the furnace are heat and acid resistant. Hot flue gas passes up over the plates carrying out liberated hydrogen chloride gas. The intermediate product reacts with more sodium chloride in the lower, hotter section of the kiln producing sodium sulfate. This exits the furnace and passes through cooling drums before being milled, screened and sent to product storage facilities.

The process involves intermediate formation of sodium bisulfate, an exothermic reaction that occurs at room temperature:

NaCl + H_{2}SO_{4} → HCl + NaHSO_{4}

The second step of the process is endothermic, requiring energy input:

NaCl + NaHSO_{4} → HCl + Na_{2}SO_{4}

Temperatures in the range 600-700 °C are required.
