= Sodium bisulfate =

One sodium cation and one hydrogensulfate anion
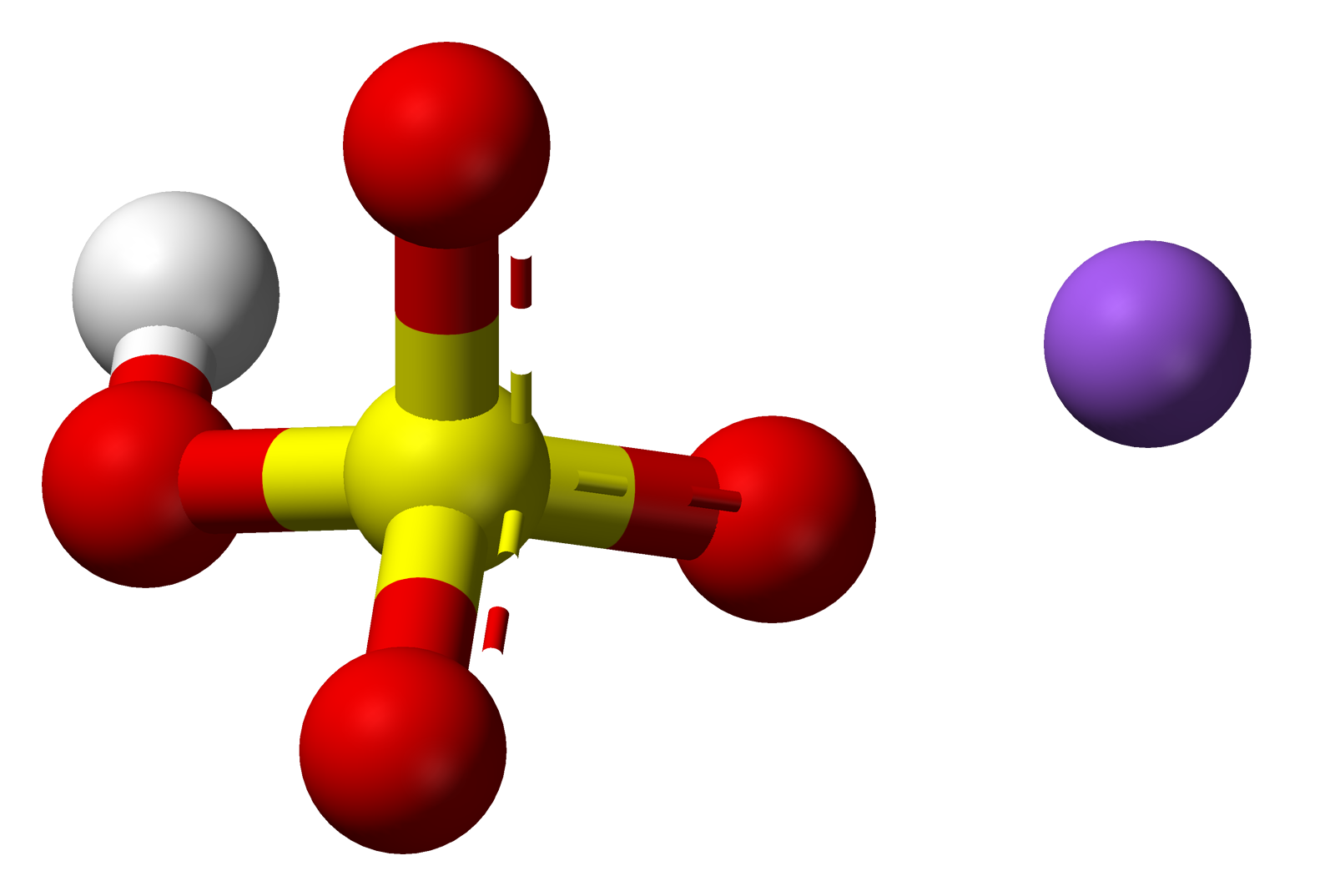
Ball-and-stick model of the component ions
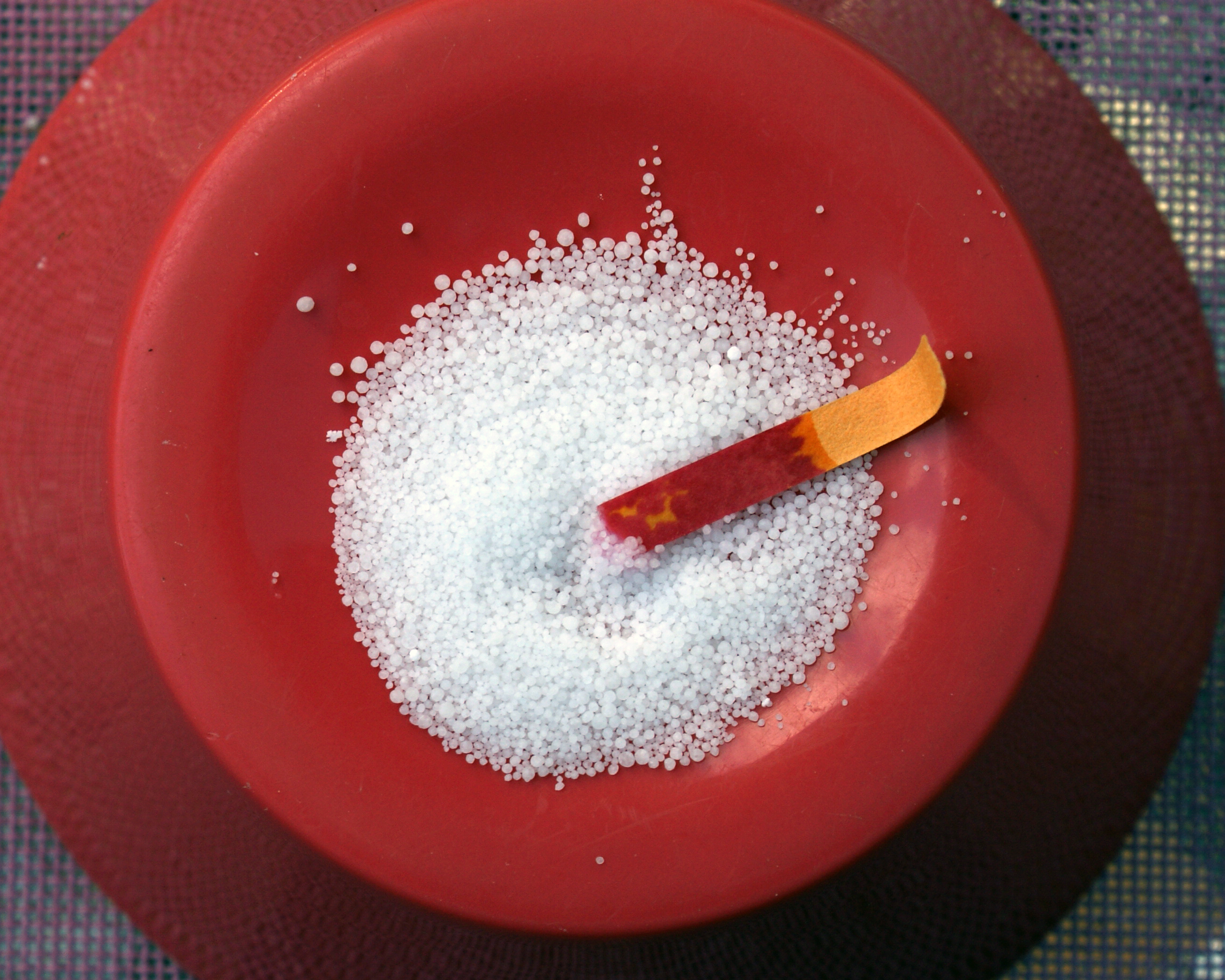
- Sodium bisulfate, as a white powder, turns indicator paper red.

Names
- IUPAC name Sodium hydrogen sulfate
- Other names Sodium acid sulfate Bisulfate of soda (sodiooxy)sulfonic acid

Identifiers
CAS Number	7681-38-1; 10034-88-5 (monohydrate)
3D model (JSmol)	Interactive image
ChEMBL	ChEMBL1200488
ChemSpider	56397
ECHA InfoCard	100.028.787
EC Number	231-665-7
E number	E514(ii) (acidity regulators, ...)
PubChem CID	516919
RTECS number	VZ1860000
UNII	BU8V88OWIQ; 3KLS9Y77YJ (monohydrate)
UN number	2837
CompTox Dashboard (EPA)	DTXSID3033983
- InChI: InChI=1S/Na.H2O4S/c;1-5(2,3)4/h;(H2,1,2,3,4)/q+1;/p-1 Key: WBHQBSYUUJJSRZ-UHFFFAOYSA-M; InChI=1/Na.H2O4S/c;1-5(2,3)4/h;(H2,1,2,3,4)/q+1;/p-1 Key: WBHQBSYUUJJSRZ-REWHXWOFAO
- SMILES: [Na+].[O-]S(=O)(=O)O

Properties
Chemical formula	NaHSO_{4}
Molar mass	120.06 g/mol (anhydrous); 138.07 g/mol (monohydrate)
Appearance	white solid
Density	2.742 g/cm^{3} (anhydrous); 1.8 g/cm^{3} (monohydrate)
Melting point	58.5 °C (137.3 °F; 331.6 K) (monohydrate); 315 °C (anhydrous)
Boiling point	decomposes to Na_{2}S_{2}O_{7} (+ H_{2}O) at 315 °C (599 °F; 588 K)
Solubility in water	28.5 g/100 mL (25 °C); 100 g/100 mL (100 °C)
Solubility	Insoluble in ammonia
Acidity (pK_{a})	1.99

Structure
Crystal structure	triclinic (anhydrous) monoclinic (monohydrate)

Hazards
- GHS labelling
Pictograms	(GHS05: Corrosive)
Signal word	Danger
Hazard statements	H318
Precautionary statements	P280, P305+P351+P338, P310
NFPA 704 (fire diamond)	2 0 1
Flash point	Non-flammable
Safety data sheet (SDS)	External MSDS

Related compounds
Other anions	Sodium sulfate
Other cations	Potassium bisulfate
- Except where otherwise noted, data are given for materials in their standard state (at 25 °C [77 °F], 100 kPa). verify (what is ?) Infobox references

Sodium bisulfate, also known as sodium hydrogen sulfate, (Note: The prefix "bi" in "bisulfate" comes from an outdated naming system and is based on the observation that there is two times as much sulfate (SO_{4}), relative to the cation, in sodium bisulfate (NaHSO_{4}) and other bisulfates as in sodium sulfate (Na_{2}SO_{4}) and other sulfates.) is the sodium salt of the bisulfate anion, with the molecular formula NaHSO_{4}. Sodium bisulfate is an acid salt formed by partial neutralization of sulfuric acid by an equivalent of sodium base, typically in the form of either sodium hydroxide (lye) or sodium chloride (table salt). It is a dry granular product that can be safely shipped and stored. The anhydrous form is hygroscopic. Solutions of sodium bisulfate are acidic, with a 1M solution having a pH of slightly below 1.

== Production ==
Sodium bisulfate is produced as an intermediate in the Mannheim process, an industrial process involving the reaction of sodium chloride and sulfuric acid:

NaCl + H_{2}SO_{4} → HCl + NaHSO_{4}

The process for the formation of sodium bisulfate is highly exothermic. The liquid sodium bisulfate is sprayed and cooled so that it forms a solid bead. The hydrogen chloride gas is dissolved in water to produce hydrochloric acid as a useful coproduct of the reaction.

Sodium bisulfate can be generated as a byproduct of the production of many other mineral acids via the reaction of their sodium salts with an excess of sulfuric acid:

NaX + H_{2}SO_{4} → NaHSO_{4} + HX ( X^{−} = CN^{−}, NO_{3}^{−}, ClO_{4}^{−})

The acids HX produced have a lower boiling point than the reactants and are separated from the reaction mixture by distillation.

=== Chemical reactions ===
Hydrated sodium bisulfate dehydrates at 58 °C (136 °F) at which point it separates from the water molecule attached to it. Once cooled again, it is freshly hygroscopic. Heating sodium bisulfate to 280 °C (536 °F) produces sodium pyrosulfate, another colorless salt:

2 NaHSO_{4} → Na_{2}S_{2}O_{7} + H_{2}O

== Uses ==
Sodium bisulfate is used primarily to lower pH. It is also used in metal finishing, cleaning products, and to lower the pH of water for effective chlorination in swimming pools and hot tubs. Sodium bisulfate is also AAFCO approved as a general-use feed additive, including use in poultry feed and companion animal food. It is used as a urine acidifier to reduce urinary stones in cats.

It is highly toxic to certain echinoderms, but fairly harmless to most other life forms; so it is used in controlling outbreaks of crown-of-thorns starfish.

Sodium bisulfate was the primary active ingredient in the toilet bowl cleaners Vanish and Sani-Flush, both now discontinued.

In the textiles industry, it is sometimes applied to velvet cloth made with a silk backing and a pile of cellulose-based fiber (rayon, cotton, hemp, etc.) to create "burnout velvet": the sodium bisulfate, when applied to such a fabric and heated, causes the cellulose-based fibers to become brittle and flake away, leaving burned-out areas in the finished material, usually in attractive patterns.

Sodium bisulfate is the active ingredient in some granular poultry litter treatments used to control ammonia. Sodium bisulfate has also been shown to significantly reduce the concentration of Campylobacter and Salmonella in chicken houses.

Sodium bisulfate is sometimes used as the active ingredient in flocculant tablets, a step in soil and water quality test kits.

=== In food ===
Sodium bisulfate is used as a food additive to leaven cake mixes (make them rise) as well as being used in meat and poultry processing and most recently in browning prevention of fresh-cut produce. Sodium bisulfate is considered generally recognized as safe (GRAS) by the FDA and has been named to the EPA Safer Choice Safer Chemicals Ingredients List. The food-grade product also meets the requirements set out in the Food Chemicals Codex. It is denoted by E number E514ii in the EU and is also approved for use in Australia, New Zealand, Canada, and Mexico. where it is listed as additive 514. Food grade sodium bisulfate is used in a variety of food products, including beverages, dressings, sauces, and fillings. It has many synonyms including bisulfate of soda, sodium acid sulfate, mono sodium hydrogen sulfate, sodium hydrogen sulfate, sodium hydrosulfate, and sulfuric acid sodium salt (1:1).

Sodium bisulfate lowers the pH without creating a sour taste, and has been used in the place of citric, malic, or phosphoric acids that are commercially available, and it can also be used as an anti-browning agent.

== Notes ==
The "bi" refers to the presence of the hydrogen.
