= Sulfur trioxide =

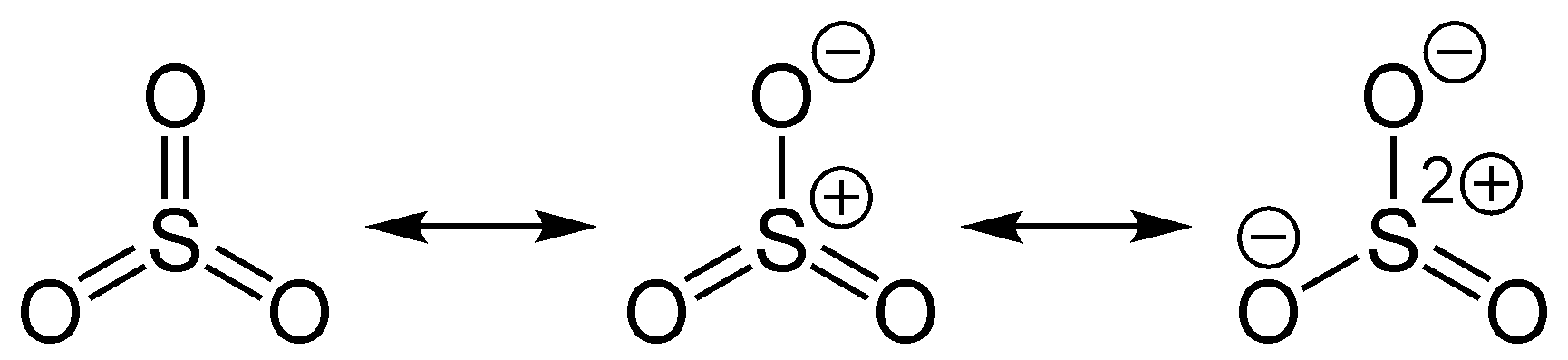
- Resonance structures

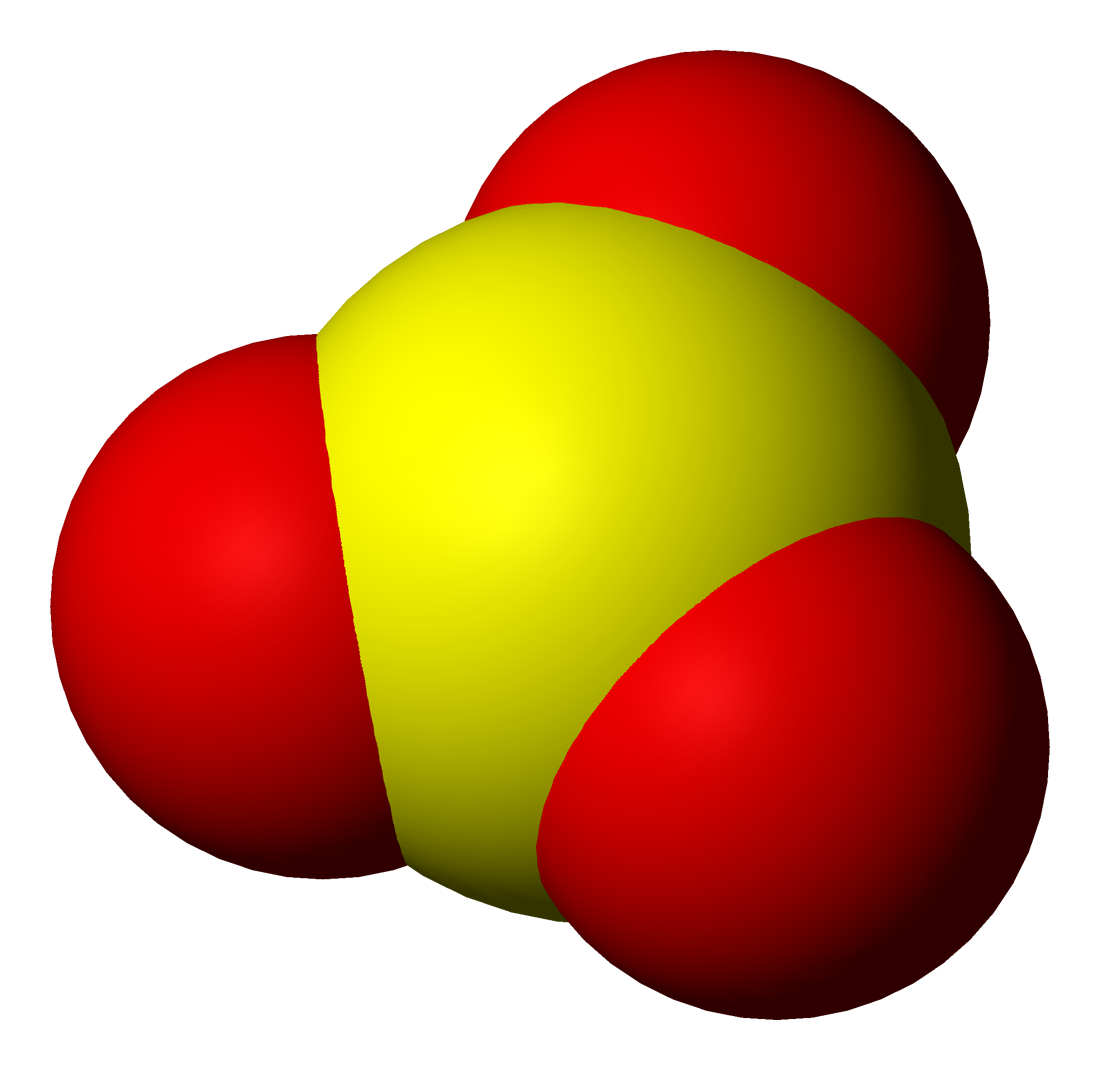
- Space-filling model

Names
- Preferred IUPAC name Sulfur trioxide
- Systematic IUPAC name Sulfonylideneoxidane
- Other names Sulfuric anhydride, Sulfur(VI) oxide

Identifiers
CAS Number	7446-11-9
3D model (JSmol)	monomer: Interactive image; γ-trimer: Interactive image; α/β polymer: Interactive image; (monohydrate): Interactive image
ChEBI	CHEBI:29384
ChemSpider	23080
ECHA InfoCard	100.028.361
EC Number	231-197-3
Gmelin Reference	1448
PubChem CID	24682; 22235242 (hemihydrate); (monohydrate): 23035042
RTECS number	WT4830000
UNII	HH2O7V4LYD
UN number	UN 1829
CompTox Dashboard (EPA)	DTXSID1029673
- InChI: InChI=1S/O3S/c1-4(2)3 Key: AKEJUJNQAAGONA-UHFFFAOYSA-N; InChI=1/O3S/c1-4(2)3 Key: AKEJUJNQAAGONA-UHFFFAOYAX; (monohydrate): InChI=1S/O3S.H2O/c1-4(2)3;/h;1H2 Key: DEUOBQUHDSDIFY-UHFFFAOYSA-N
- SMILES: monomer: O=S(=O)=O; γ-trimer: O=S0(=O)OS(=O)(=O)OS(=O)(=O)O0; α/β polymer: OS(=O)(=O)OS(=O)(=O)OS(=O)(=O)OS(=O)(=O)OS(=O)(=O)OS(=O)(=O)OS(=O)(=O)OS(=O)(=O)OS(=O)(=O)OS(=O)(=O)OS(=O)(=O)OS(=O)(=O)OS(=O)(=O)OS(=O)(=O)OS(=O)(=O)OS(=O)(=O)OS(=O)(=O)OS(=O)(=O)OS(=O)(=O)OS(=O)(=O)OS(=O)(=O)OS(=O)(=O)OS(=O)(=O)OS(=O)(=O)OS(=O)(=O)OS(=O)(=O)OS(=O)(=O)OS(=O)(=O)OS(=O)(=O)OS(=O)(=O)O; (monohydrate): O.O=S(=O)=O

Properties
Chemical formula	SO_{3}
Molar mass	80.06 g·mol^{−1}
Appearance	Colorless to white crystalline solid which will fume in air. Colorless liquid and gas.
Odor	Varies. Vapor is pungent; like sulfur dioxide. Mist is odorless.
Density	1.92 g/cm^{3}, liquid
Melting point	16.9 °C (62.4 °F; 290.0 K)
Boiling point	45 °C (113 °F; 318 K)
Solubility in water	Reacts to give sulfuric acid

Thermochemistry
Std molar entropy (S^{⦵}_{298})	256.77 JK^{−1}mol^{−1}
Std enthalpy of formation (Δ_{f}H^{⦵}_{298})	−395.7 kJ/mol

Hazards
- Occupational safety and health (OHS/OSH)
Main hazards	Highly corrosive, extremely strong dehydrating agent
- GHS labelling
Pictograms	(GHS05: Corrosive) (GHS07: Exclamation mark)
Signal word	Danger
Hazard statements	H314, H335
Precautionary statements	P261, P280, P305+P351+P338, P310
NFPA 704 (fire diamond)	3 0 3 W; OX
Flash point	Non-flammable
- Lethal dose or concentration (LD, LC)
LC_{50} (median concentration)	rat, 4 hr 375 mg/m^{3}
Safety data sheet (SDS)	ICSC 1202

Related compounds
Other cations	Selenium trioxide Tellurium trioxide Polonium trioxide
Related sulfur oxides	Sulfur monoxide Sulfur dioxide
Related compounds	Sulfuric acid
- Except where otherwise noted, data are given for materials in their standard state (at 25 °C [77 °F], 100 kPa). verify (what is ?) Infobox references

Sulfur trioxide (alternative spelling sulphur trioxide) is the chemical compound with the formula SO_{3}. It has been described as "unquestionably the most [economically] important sulfur oxide". It is produced industrially on a vast scale as a precursor to sulfuric acid (Contact process) and sulfonate-based surfactants; however, it is not isolated in its own right due to the difficulties in safely storing and handling it.

Sulfur trioxide exists in several forms: gaseous monomer, crystalline trimer, and solid polymer. Sulfur trioxide is a solid at just below room temperature with a relatively narrow liquid range. Gaseous SO_{3} is the primary precursor to acid rain.

== Molecular structure and bonding ==
=== Monomer ===
The molecule SO_{3} is trigonal planar. As predicted by VSEPR theory, its structure belongs to the D_{3h} point group. The sulfur atom has an oxidation state of +6 and may be assigned a formal charge value as low as 0 (if all three sulfur-oxygen bonds are assumed to be double bonds) or as high as +2 (if the Octet Rule is assumed). When the formal charge is non-zero, the S-O bonding is assumed to be delocalized. In any case the three S-O bond lengths are equal to one another, at 1.42 Å. The electrical dipole moment of gaseous sulfur trioxide is zero.

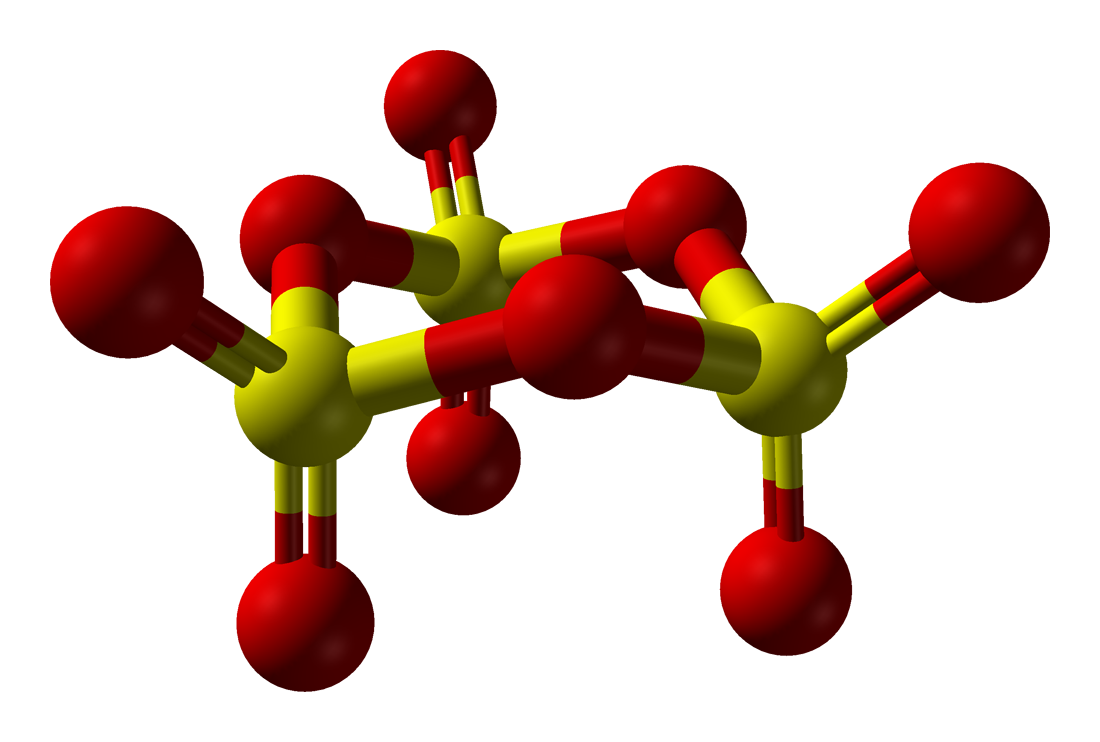
Ball-and-stick model of the cyclic trimer of SO_{3}

=== Trimer ===
Both liquid and gaseous SO_{3} exists in an equilibrium between the monomer and the cyclic trimer. The nature of solid SO_{3} is complex and at least 3 polymorphs are known, with conversion between them being dependent on traces of water.

Absolutely pure SO_{3} freezes at 16.8 °C to give the γ-SO_{3} form, which adopts the cyclic trimer configuration [S(=O)_{2}(μ-O)]_{3}.

=== Polymer ===
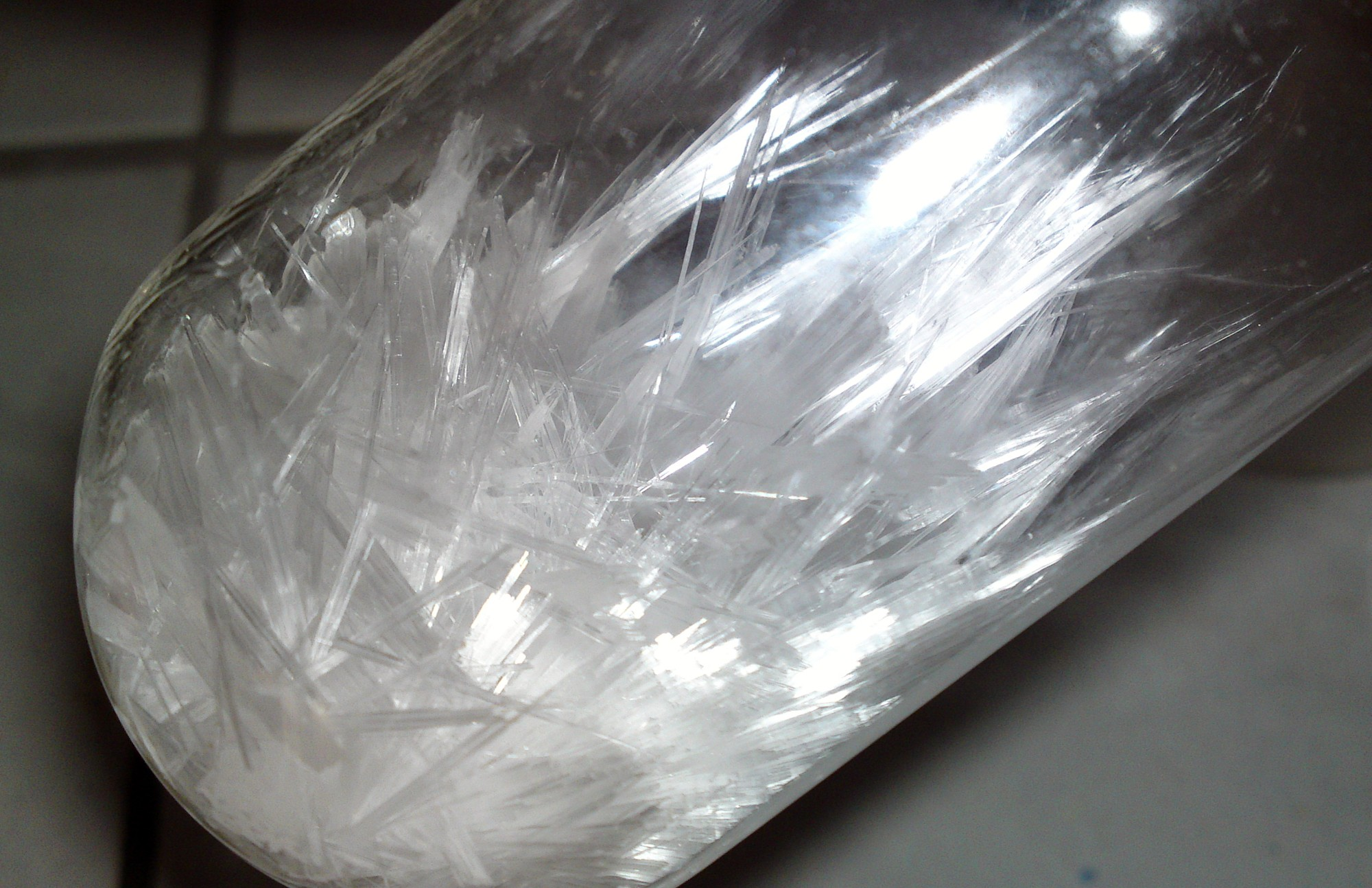
An ampoule of sulfur trioxide

If SO_{3} is condensed above 27 °C, then α-SO_{3} forms, which has a melting point of 62.3 °C. α-SO_{3} is fibrous in appearance. Structurally, it is the polymer [S(=O)_{2}(μ-O)]_{n}. Each end of the polymer is terminated with OH groups. β-SO_{3}, like the alpha form, is fibrous but of different molecular weight, consisting of a hydroxyl-capped polymer, but melts at 32.5 °C. Both the gamma and the beta forms are metastable, eventually converting to the stable alpha form if left standing for sufficient time. This conversion is caused by traces of water.

Relative vapor pressures of solid SO_{3} are alpha < beta < gamma at identical temperatures, indicative of their relative molecular weights. Liquid sulfur trioxide has a vapor pressure consistent with the gamma form. Thus heating a crystal of α-SO_{3} to its melting point results in a sudden increase in vapor pressure, which can be forceful enough to shatter a glass vessel in which it is heated. This effect is known as the "alpha explosion".

== Chemical reactions ==
Sulfur trioxide undergoes many reactions.

=== Hydration and hydrofluorination ===
SO_{3} is the anhydride of H_{2}SO_{4}. Thus, it is susceptible to hydration:

SO_{3} + H_{2}O → H_{2}SO_{4} (Δ_{f}H = −200 kJ/mol)

Gaseous sulfur trioxide fumes profusely even in a relatively dry atmosphere owing to formation of a sulfuric acid mist. SO_{3} is aggressively hygroscopic. The heat of hydration is sufficient that mixtures of SO_{3} and wood or cotton can ignite. In such cases, SO_{3} dehydrates these carbohydrates.

Akin to the behavior of H_{2}O, hydrogen fluoride adds to give fluorosulfuric acid:

SO_{3} + HF → FSO_{3}H

=== Deoxygenation ===
SO_{3} reacts with dinitrogen pentoxide to give the nitronium salt of pyrosulfate:

2 SO_{3} + N_{2}O_{5} → [NO_{2}]_{2}S_{2}O_{7}

=== Oxidant ===
Sulfur trioxide is an oxidant. It oxidizes sulfur dichloride to thionyl chloride.

SO_{3} + SCl_{2} → SOCl_{2} + SO_{2}

=== Lewis acid ===
SO_{3} is a strong Lewis acid readily forming adducts with Lewis bases. With pyridine, it gives the sulfur trioxide pyridine complex. Related adducts form from dioxane and trimethylamine.

=== Sulfonating agent ===
Sulfur trioxide is a potent sulfonating agent, i.e. it adds SO_{3} groups to substrates. Often the substrates are organic, as in aromatic sulfonation. For activated substrates, Lewis base adducts of sulfur trioxide are effective sulfonating agents.

== Preparation ==
The direct oxidation of sulfur dioxide to sulfur trioxide in air proceeds very slowly:

2 SO_{2} + O_{2} → 2 SO_{3} (ΔH = −198.4 kJ/mol)

=== Industrial ===
Industrially SO_{3} is made by the contact process. Sulfur dioxide is produced by the burning of sulfur or iron pyrite (a sulfide ore of iron). After being purified by electrostatic precipitation, the SO_{2} is then oxidised by atmospheric oxygen at between 400 and 600 °C over a catalyst. A typical catalyst consists of vanadium pentoxide (V_{2}O_{5}) activated with potassium oxide K_{2}O on kieselguhr or silica support. Platinum also works very well but is too expensive and is poisoned (rendered ineffective) much more easily by impurities. The majority of sulfur trioxide made in this way is converted into sulfuric acid.

=== Laboratory ===
Sulfur trioxide can be prepared in the laboratory by the two-stage pyrolysis of sodium bisulfate. Sodium pyrosulfate is an intermediate product:

1. Dehydration at 315 °C:
  2 NaHSO_{4} → Na_{2}S_{2}O_{7} + H_{2}O
2. Cracking at 460 °C:
  Na_{2}S_{2}O_{7} → Na_{2}SO_{4} + SO_{3}

The latter occurs at lower temperatures (around 300 °C) in the presence of catalytic H_{2}SO_{4}. KHSO_{4} undergoes the same reactions at a higher temperature.

Another two step method involving a salt pyrolysis starts with concentrated sulfuric acid and anhydrous tin tetrachloride:

1. Reaction between tin tetrachloride and sulfuric acid in a 1:2 molar mixture at near reflux (114 °C):
  SnCl_{4} + 2 H_{2}SO_{4} → Sn(SO_{4})_{2} + 4 HCl
2. Pyrolysis of anhydrous tin(IV) sulfate at 150 °C - 200 °C:
  Sn(SO_{4})_{2} → SnO_{2} + 2 SO_{3}

To further reduce water contamination, Oleum and a slight excess of Tin(IV) Chloride should be used. The slight excess of SnCl_{4} can then be separated by carefully heating the solid Tin(IV) Sulfate under a vacuum to no more than 120 °C. The excess SO_{3} from the Oleum and the remaining SnCl_{4} will react during HCl formation and form Tin(IV) Oxide and Sulfuryl Chloride. If an excess of SO_{3} in the Oleum is present relative to SnCl_{4} , the Tin(IV) Oxide will absorb it and form more Tin(IV) Sulfate.

The advantage of this method over the sodium bisulfate one is that it can produce the pure trimer of SO_{3} (since no water is present) while still using safe temperatures for normal borosilicate laboratory glassware. Other dry sulfate salt pyrolysis reactions require higher temperatures which increases the risk of shattering. A disadvantage is that it generates significant quantities of hydrogen chloride gas which needs to be captured as well.

SO_{3} may also be prepared by dehydrating sulfuric acid with phosphorus pentoxide.

== Applications ==
Sulfur trioxide is a reagent in sulfonation reactions. Dimethyl sulfate is produced commercially by the reaction of dimethyl ether with sulfur trioxide:

CH_{3}OCH_{3} + SO_{3} → (CH_{3})_{2}SO_{4}

Sulfate esters are used as detergents, dyes, and pharmaceuticals. Sulfur trioxide is generated in situ from sulfuric acid or is used as a solution in the acid.

B_{2}O_{3} stabilized sulfur trioxide was traded by Baker & Adamson under the tradename "Sulfan" in the 20th century.

== Safety ==
Along with being an oxidizing agent, sulfur trioxide is highly corrosive. It reacts violently with water to produce highly corrosive sulfuric acid.

== See also ==
- Hypervalent molecule
- Sulfur trioxide pyridine complex

== Sources ==
- NIST Standard Reference Database
- ChemSub Online
