= Mining in the United Kingdom =

Overview of the mining industry in the UK

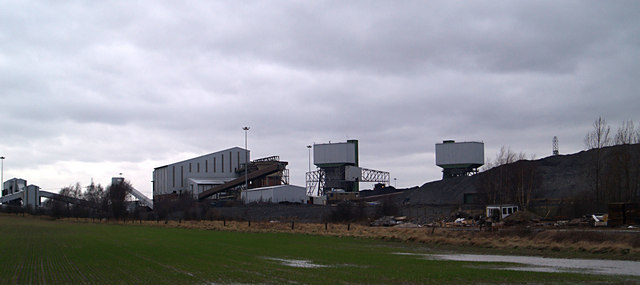
Kellingley Colliery on the border of West and North Yorkshire

Mining in the United Kingdom produces a wide variety of fossil fuels, metals, and industrial minerals due to its complex geology. In 2013, there were over 2,000 active mines, quarries, and offshore drilling sites on the continental land mass of the United Kingdom producing £34bn of minerals and employing 36,000 people.

== Brief history ==
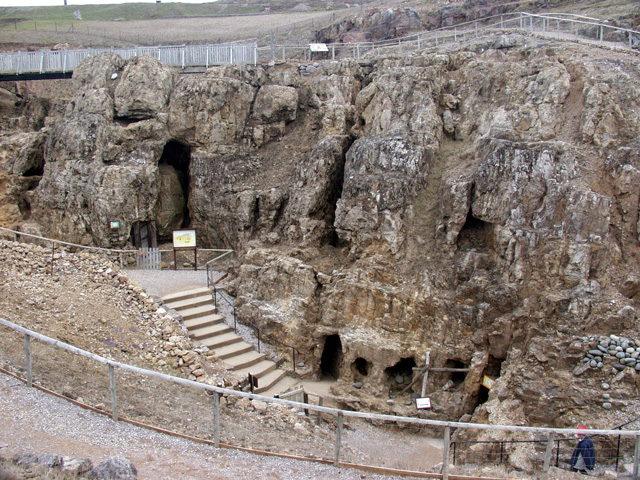
The entrance to the Bronze Age Copper Mine complex on the Great Orme

The United Kingdom has a rich history of mining. Mining of non-ferrous minerals, particularly of copper and tin, has been ongoing since the Bronze Age. For example, copper was mined in Wales during approximately 2200–850 BC including the Great Orme. Metalworking debris found beneath the ramparts at Beeston Castle in Cheshire is evidence of bronze production during the Bronze Age.

Later, lead and copper attracted the Romans to Britain. The Romans introduced iron tools and used local slaves to mine galena, an important lead ore mineral, from which they refined lead, tin and silver. These metals were used locally and also transported by ship throughout the Roman Empire. Galena was mined from deep mines located in Scotland and Wales.

The widespread availability of coal and iron was a significant factor in Europe's Industrial Revolution of the late 18th and early 19th centuries. Although less coal and iron ore are mined in the United Kingdom today, they were once mined in large quantities and utilized for steel and energy production. With large quantities of important minerals available and easily accessible, the country's economy grew rapidly.

In the 20th century, the mineral industry decreased production of coal and metals due to foreign competition. However, the extraction of aggregates and crude oil has increased.

== Minerals produced in the United Kingdom 2013–2019 ==
This data is from the British Geological Survey. Values are in thousands of tonnes

Mineral	2013	2014	2015	2016	2017	2018	2019
Coal	40,089	3,685	2,784	22	20	24	99
Oil (onshore)	1,003	1,014	962	966	836	845	832
Gas (oil equivalent, onshore)	10	38	183	179	179	236	366
Sand and gravel (land)	43,379	46,832	51,053	51,231	50,143	52,065	48,700
Clay and shale	6,464	6,806	4,552	4,694	5,544	4,606	4,529
Natural gypsum	700	1,100	1,800	1,600	1,300	1,400	1,600
Slate	885	868	760	780	820	820	160
Potash	540	576	594	432	216	210	-
Silica sand	3,961	3,984	3,822	4,251	5,051	4,863	4,443
Kaolin (china clay)	1,110	1,090	1,014	940	970	996	715
Ball clay	740	733	740	743	850	867	738
Barytes	30	44	50	56	55	55	50
Peat (1000 metres cubed or 1000m3)	1,254	795					
Gold (kg)	42			6			50
Silver (kg)	82			14			130

== Fossil fuels ==
The United Kingdom still has large reserves of available fossil fuels. Natural gas, oil, and coal are all produced in the United Kingdom. Coal is mined from many areas in the United Kingdom from both deep mines and surface mines. In addition to the coal being mined on land, large reserves of oil and natural gas are being tapped in the North Sea.

=== Natural gas ===
As of 2008 the United Kingdom was the tenth largest producer of natural gas in the world. Natural gas reserves are concentrated in three areas:

1. associated fields in the United Kingdom Continental Shelf
2. non-associated fields in the Southern Gas Basin, adjacent to the Dutch sector of the North Sea
3. non-associated fields in the Irish Sea.

=== Oil ===
The United Kingdom has an estimated 780 million tonnes of proved and probable oil reserves; most of these oil reserves are located on the United Kingdom Continental Shelf in the North Sea off the eastern coast of the United Kingdom. There are also sizable reserves in the North Sea north of the Shetland Islands, with smaller fields in the North Atlantic. Located in Dorset, the Wytch Farm field is the largest onshore oilfield in Europe with estimated recoverable reserves of 480 million barrels of crude oil.

=== Coal ===
In 2013, 13 million tonnes of coal were produced in the United Kingdom, employing 4,000 workers across 30 locations. In the United Kingdom coal is mined from 3 deep mines and 26 surface mines. The majority of coal produced in England comes from underground mines; in Scotland, most coal is mined from open-pit mines.

UK Coal was the United Kingdom's largest coal mining company, producing approximately 8.7 million tonnes of coal annually from deep mines and surface mines, and possessed estimated reserves in excess of 200 million tonnes of coal. The firm was the successor of British Coal, which was privatised in 1997. Total proved coal reserves in the United Kingdom are estimated at 220 million tonnes, although possible reserves could exceed 1 billion tonnes. UK coal production peaked in 1913 at 287 million tonnes, and has been falling ever since, chiefly due to cleaner energy generation and the loss of heavy industry.

== Metals ==
Metal production in the United Kingdom has decreased over the past century. Although the United Kingdom has a large variety of important metal ores, little metal is currently being mined due to the effects of globalization: it is cheaper to extract in other countries. For example, although large reserves of iron and copper ores exist in the United Kingdom, these ores are now largely imported – copper ore from Chile and North America, and iron ore from China, Brazil and Australia yield higher grades of metals at lower costs.

The metalliferous sector of the mining industry was worth £5 million in 2012, making up a very small part of the sector. It consists mainly of the Galantas Gold Corporation's gold mine in Cavanacaw, Northern Ireland. Currently an open pit mine, permission was granted for it to extend 400 metres underground. Lead and silver are still being mined as a by-product of this mine.

In 2014, the Australian company Wolf Minerals started to re-open Drakelands Mine (previously Hermerdon Mine) in Devon. It is the fourth-largest reserve of tungsten in the world and also expects to produce 1,000 tonnes of tin annually. Wolf Minerals ceased trading operations on 10 October 2018, as the mine never achieved extraction or financial targets. Despite such losses, the site is still thought to have potential as the site retains large ore deposits and valuable infrastructure.

== Industrial minerals ==
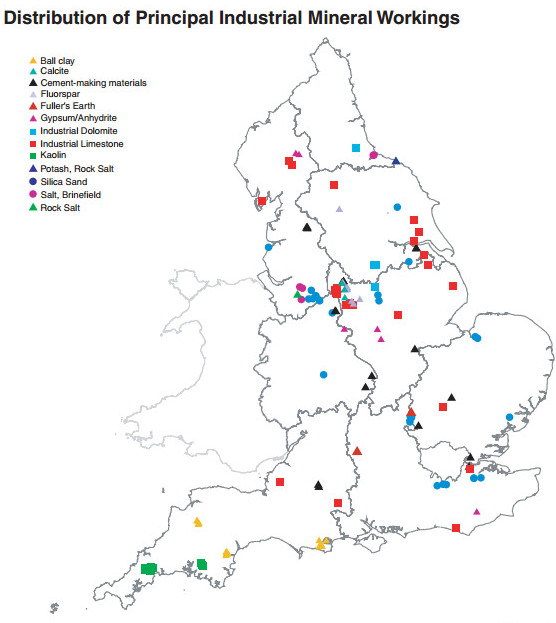
Distribution of Principal Industrial Mineral Workings

Many types of industrial minerals are found in the United Kingdom, especially England. However, the location of individual industrial minerals and their quality fundamentally reflects geology and many are highly restricted in their occurrence. This causes many to coincide with environmentally sensitive areas. Examples include fluorspar and potash, which are essentially confined to National Parks. Carboniferous limestones and the Cretaceous Chalk are the two main limestone resources which are used for cement and industry in England. These rocks also give rise to highly attractive scenery and consequently cause controversies when utilised.

The most common minerals extracted are sand and gravel, used in construction and road building. 51% (167 million tonnes) of all the minerals produced in the United Kingdom in 2011 were aggregates. With 80 quarries, Tarmac is the United Kingdom's largest producer of crushed rock, sand, and gravel.

The industrial minerals sector in England generally consists of a small number of large businesses, with production of each mineral being dominated by few companies. Many firms form part of major international groups. However, there are also a number of smaller producers, chiefly industrial carbonates, silica sand and fluorspar, with a single site. The industrial minerals sector accounts for a relatively small proportion of Gross Value Added in the UK economy (an estimated £788 million). However, it is important to consider where the GVA is created: of the 69 main producing sites in the UK industrial minerals sector, 54 (78%) are located in either remote rural or accessible rural locations. Employment figures for the industrial mineral sector are under 15,000.

The markets for industrial minerals range from localised industries to international trade. Movement of the industrial minerals to market takes place by road, rail and sea, the latter to serve export markets, although some rock salt and agricultural dolomite is transported along its coast. Of the total marketable output of industrial minerals of 40 million tonnes (excl. aggregates) it is estimated that over 25% is transferred by rail or ship, a much higher proportion than for aggregates.

There are many slate mines in the United Kingdom producing slate for building and architectural purposes, of which the largest is the Delabole Slate Mine on the north coast of Cornwall. The United Kingdom also has an abundance of specialized minerals such as china clay, used in fine china and porcelain; and Fuller's earth, an absorbent mineral used for spill containment and cleaning supplies. However, production of Fuller's earth ceased in 2005 in the country.

The UK is a leading world producer and exporter of china clay and ball clay. Both minerals have a very limited occurrence and it is important that adequate reserves are maintained for long term use. The extraction of china clay results in a significant amount of waste — some 9 tonnes are produced for each tonne of clay.

In June 2015, the National Parks Authority voted in favour of allowing Sirius Minerals plc to construct the world's largest potash mine at Woodsmith on the North York Moors. It aims to create 1,000 jobs in an area which lost its previous mining industry. To avoid damaging the sensitive surroundings, the polyhalite is to be carried 36 km (22 mi) underground from the mine to the Tees. Nearby Boulby Mine, currently the world's only polyhalite producer, recorded its one million tonne target in 2018 and has plans to increase production to three million tonnes per annum by 2025.
