= Woodsmith Mine Tunnel =

Tunnel in North Yorkshire, England

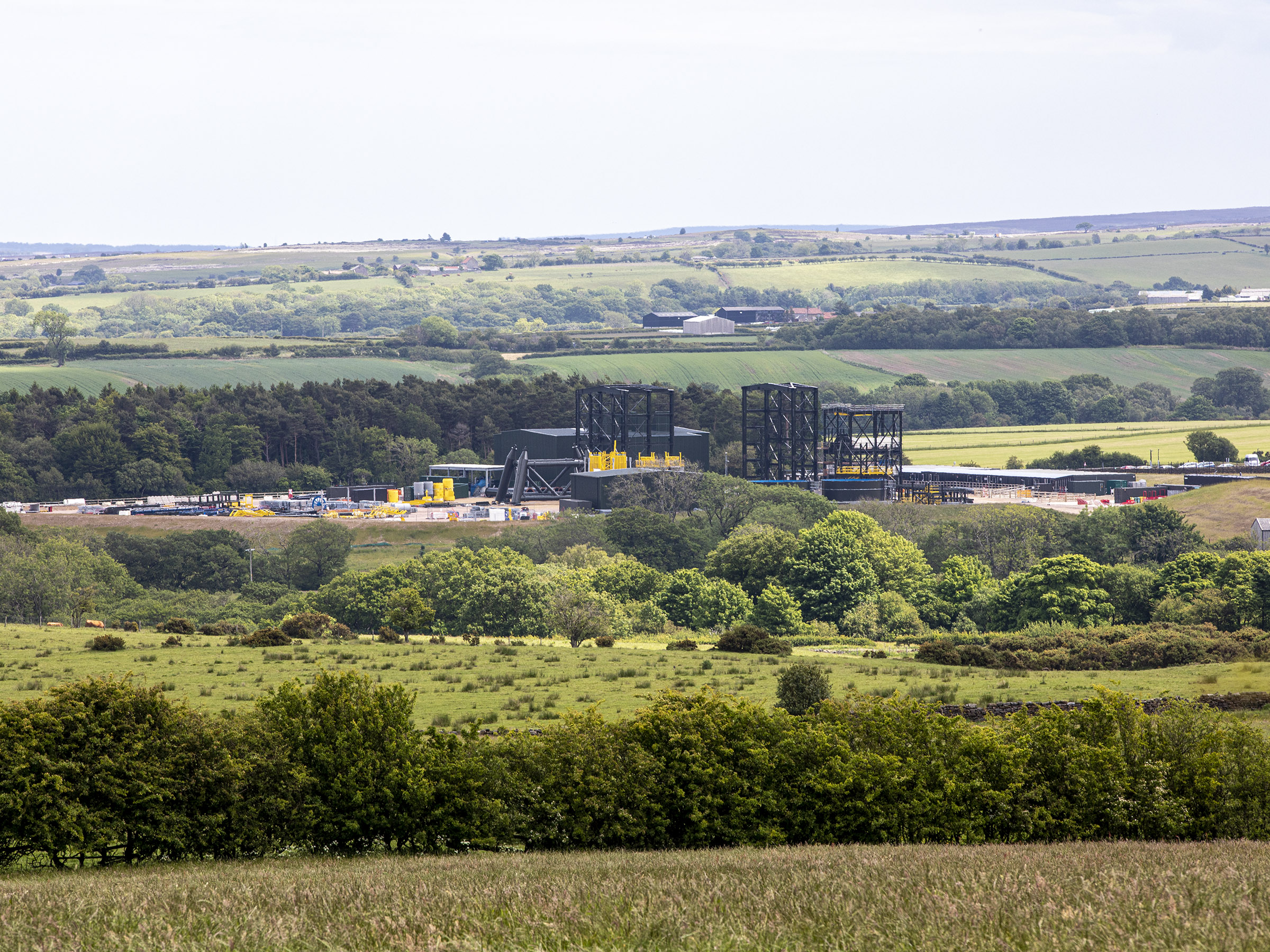
- Lockwood Beck site
- Interactive map of Woodsmith Mine Tunnel

Overview
- Official name: Mineral Transport System (MTS)
- Location: North Yorkshire
- Coordinates: 54.4942°N 0.9002°W
- Status: Under construction
- Crosses: River Esk; North York Moors; A169; A171; A173; A174
- Start: Woodsmith Mine (Sneatonthorpe) (54.4350°N 0.6216°W)
- End: Wilton (54.59645°N 1.10203°W)

Operation
- Work began: April 2019
- Constructed: 2019–
- Opens: 2030
- Owner: Anglo American PLC
- Traffic: Polyhalite
- Character: Mineral transport

Technical
- Design engineer: Strabag
- Length: 23 miles (37 km)
- No. of tracks: 1 (Maintenance train)
- Operating speed: 13 miles per hour (21 km/h)
- Max elevation: 390 feet (120 m)
- Min elevation: 1,180 feet (360 m)
- Tunnel clearance: 20 feet (6 m)
- Width: 20 feet (6 m)

The Woodsmith Mine Tunnel (also known as a Mineral Transport System [MTS]) is a 23-mile (37 km) long tunnel that will stretch between Woodsmith Mine at Sneatonthorpe near Whitby in North Yorkshire and the Wilton International complex on Teesside, England. The tunnel has been in development since 2016, but cutting of the tunnel bore did not start until April 2019, with an original projected completion date of 2021, now projected to 2030. By December 2025 tunnelling had advanced 19 miles (30 km), 81% complete.

When finished, the tunnel will be the longest tunnel in the United Kingdom and will also house the longest conveyor in the UK. (Note: Whilst the Channel Tunnel is underground for 35 miles (56 km), it is not wholly within the United Kingdom. Additionally, the twin-bore Crossrail tunnels stretch for 13 miles (21 km) across London, and are regularly listed as being 26 miles (42 km), when this is in fact the total amount of tunnel mileage across the two tunnels.) The estimated cost of the tunnel in November 2018 was £1.1 billion.

== Background ==
York Potash Ltd (Note: YPL became part of Sirius Minerals in 2011. In 2020, Sirius was sold to Anglo American.) put forward the idea of mining potash and polyhalite on the moors above Whitby in 2010. Originally, three options for moving the mineral out were considered; a pipeline, a tunnel or a railway. Whilst the intended end location is Wilton (for delivery to the Redcar Bulk Terminal [RBT]), the developers also considered the Ports of Hull and of Immingham to the south. However the geology south through the Yorkshire Wolds was prohibitive for tunnelling as the chalk bedrock carries aquifers that are important for the region and would also need extra access/ventilation shafts, create more overburden and be of a significant extra cost than a shorter tunnel to Teesside. A tunnel to Hull would stretch for 60 miles (97 km) and need an extra 62% of tunnelling effort, time and expense.

Transporting the product out via a railway line involved crossing the River Esk at Larpool Viaduct, and then along the Esk Valley Line via two reversals in Whitby to gain the route towards Middlesbrough.

A pipeline would have involved turning the potash and polyhalite into a slurry which would have required a more labour and technically enhanced process at both ends of the transport system. A pipeline would also be above ground and cause a lot of environmental damage.

Both the pipeline and rail options were dropped in favour of a tunnel with conveyors in it during the planning stages, and through various submissions, the accepted plan was approved in June 2015. The company, now Sirius Minerals, agreed to pay £130 million to the North York Moors National Park Authority to "protect and enhance the environment". This would be over the whole life of the project.

To avoid damaging aquifers across the route, the tunnel is designed to stay deep within the Redcar Mudstone Formation. The Redcar Mudstone Formation is less permeable to water and the route also avoids any former ironstone workings in the Redcar and Cleveland area.

The cost of the tunnel was estimated at £1.1 billion in November 2018, and when complete, the tunnel will be the longest that is wholly within the United Kingdom. The conveyor will be robust enough to transport between 10 and 20 million tonnes of polyhalite when the mine is in full production with the raw mineral being transported to Teesside for granulation and onward shipping.

== Construction ==
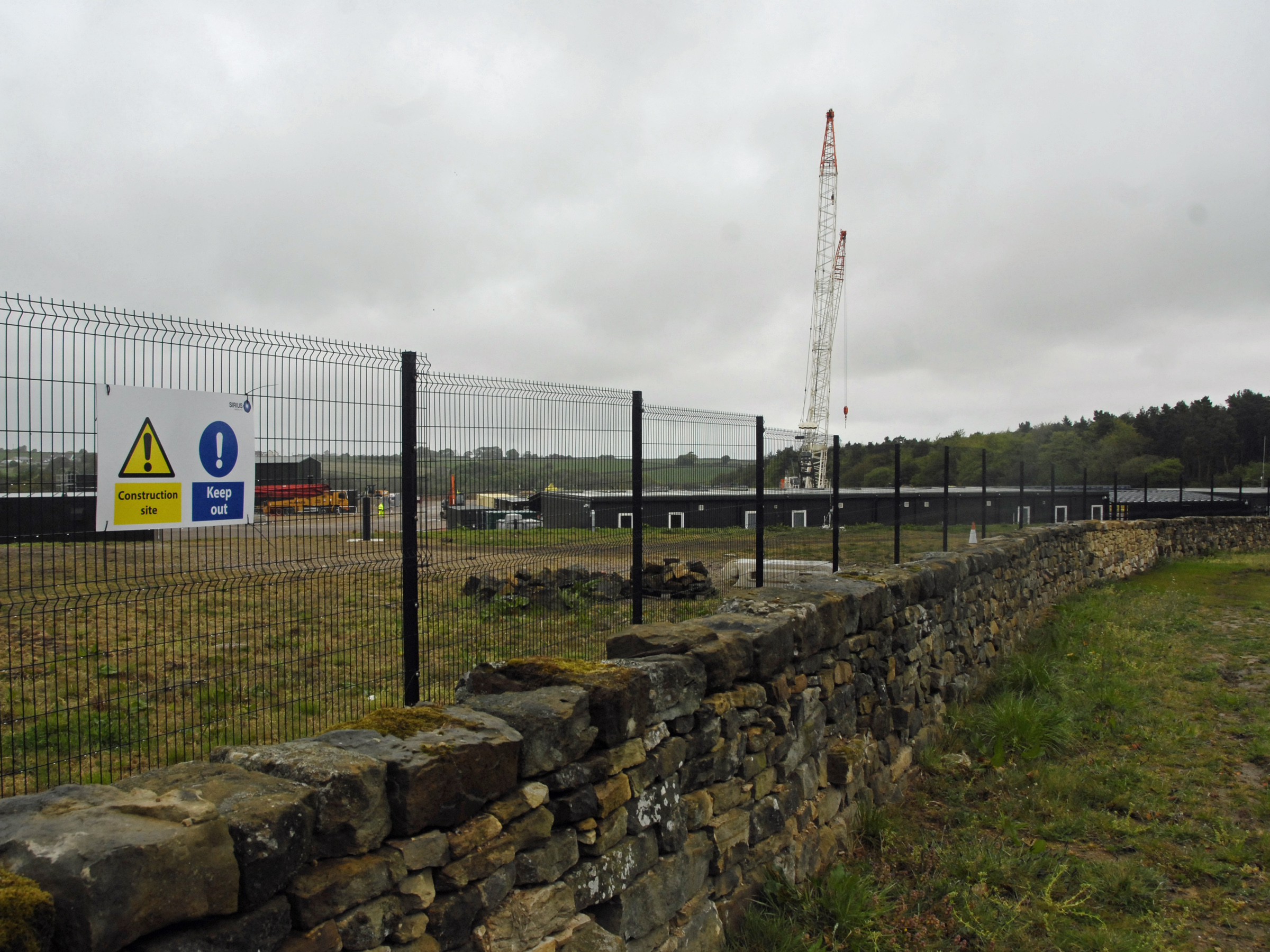
Above ground works at the Lockwood Beck site for the Woodsmith Mine tunnel

In July 2016, the UK Government awarded Sirius Minerals a Development Consent Order for the harbour facilities on Teesside. At that time, a different developer was shortlisted for the work on the tunnel which was also envisaged as needing five Tunnel Boring Machines (TBMs). This was later reduced to three TBMs.

Whilst preparatory work was started in 2016, a ceremony to "break ground" at the Wilton site was held in June 2018 with Jake Berry, the MP for the Northern Powerhouse project. In February 2019, the first of three TBMs was delivered to the Wilton site via Teesport. The first TBM, named Stella Rose after a naming competition with local schoolchildren, started boring in early April 2019. (Note: Stella Rose was so named after Stella meaning star in Latin (and Sirius being a bright star) and Rose after the nearby Roseberry Topping.) A spokesperson for Sirius Minerals commented on the tunnel stating that "we’re actually tunnelling in a rock that is relatively easy to cut, from a tunnelling point of view. It’s also relatively stable, and we’re not going through any cross measures; we’re not going from one geological horizon to another, which is where tunnels normally have more issues." By September 2019, progress had extended to 1 mile (1.6 km) of complete tunnelling with rails, connections and concrete interiors.

The tunnelling contract was split into three sections; Drive 1 was from Wilton to Lockwood Beck, Drive 2 was from Lockwood Beck southwards and Drive 3 was from Woodsmith Mine to Lockwood Beck northwards. Initially, an Austrian company, Strabag, were awarded the first tunnelling contract for the 8.1-mile (13 km) section from Wilton to Lockwood Beck. This would involve 490 feet (150 m) of cut and cover, 2,600 feet (800 m) of conventional tunnelling and 7.4 miles (11.9 km) of using a TBM in a south easterly direction. In November 2018, it was revealed that Strabag had been awarded the contract for the other two sections (nominally 7.5 miles (12 km) per section on average), and so would be the sole contracting company for the tunnel project. The TBMs will process through the route tunnelling at the front of the machine, whilst the middle and rear sections add concrete lining to the tunnel walls.

The first TBM, Stella Rose, weighs 1,800 tonnes (2,000 tons) and is 738 feet (225 m) long. The concrete segments are 4 feet 11 inches (1.5 m) in length and a special concreting plant has been built to supply the TBMs as they progress through the tunnel, lining the route with over 150,000 concrete segments.

Three ventilation shafts will be constructed: at Lady Cross Plantation, near Egton, at Lockwood Beck, and at Tocketts Lythe. Lady Cross Plantation is within the North York Moors National Park whilst the other two sites are outside the park and are located within Redcar and Cleveland. The access and ventilation shafts are planned to be 30 feet (9 m) in diameter.

Location	Coords	Distance (Note: From Woodsmith Mine site)	Depth	Notes
Woodsmith Mine	54.4350°N 0.6216°W	0	4,921 feet (1,500 m) (Note: Conveyor into tunnel is estimated to be about 1,181 feet (360 m) in depth)	
Lady Cross Plantation	54.4590°N 0.7433°W	5 miles (8 km)	1,181 feet (360 m)	Site would host a crossover for the railway and conveyors
Lockwood Beck	54.5182°N 0.9599°W	15 miles (24 km)	886 feet (270 m)	Site would host a crossover for the railway and conveyors
Tocketts Lythe	54.5478°N 1.0278°W	18 miles (29.5 km)	394 feet (120 m)	
Wilton	54.5977°N 1.1051°W	23 miles (36.5 km)	Ground level at Wilton	

The shaft at Tocketts Lythe will be smaller than the others as it is not envisaged to have a conveyor transfer. Lockwood Beck and Lady Cross plantation will be larger caverns to accommodate the crossover in conveyors and for the passing of maintenance trains. Lockwood Beck would also have needed a larger diameter shaft as it was intended be a setting off site for one of the TBMs, however the actual tunnel drive has been carried out with a single TBM from the Wilton end.

By the end of July 2020, the length of tunnel that had been dug out had reached 4.5 miles (7.2 km). Concrete segments to line the tunnel were produced in a special factory inside the Wilton International Complex, however, at least 3,000 segments needed to be imported due to the tunnel boring machine making greater progress than anticipated for. By early December 2020, 7 miles (11 km) had been tunnelled, and by June 2021, 8.7 miles (14 km) had been tunnelled, and most of the shafts had been dug out. As of February 2023 over 60% of the tunnel had been bored, and by December 2023, over 16 miles (25.8 km) had been tunnelled, which included the world record for the longest section tunnelled by a single TBM. The tunnel reached 81% complete by December 2025.

== Route ==
The tunnel will run in a north westerly direction from the Woodsmith Mine site, passing under the River Esk, the Esk Valley railway line, the A169 and then up across the Esk Valley to its first ventilation/access Point at Lady Cross Plantation. It then crosses moorland and runs alongside the A171 road for some distance crossing under it just south of Lockwood Beck reservoir where the second access point is. It then turns in a more north/north westerly direction through Tocketts Wood and under first the A173 road and then the A174 until it arrives at the Materials Handling Facility (MHF) at Wilton. After granulation, the finished product will be taken on another conveyor (this time above ground) to the export site at Redcar Bulk Terminal.

The company claim that the entire route does not travel under any housing, but it does come close to some barns.

== Details ==
Proposed cross-section of tunnel for Woodsmith Mine MTS (Mineral Transport System) This is representational only and is not to scale

- Length - 23 miles (37 km)
- Overall diameter - 20 feet (6 m)
- Internal diameter - 16 feet (4.9 m)
- Minimum depth - 390 feet (120 m)
- Average depth - 820 feet (250 m)
- Maximum depth - 1,180 feet (360 m)
- Width of conveyor belt - 47 inches (1,200 mm)
- Speed of conveyor - 13 miles per hour (21 km/h) (Note: This is a 2017 report, a factsheet released by Sirius Minerals states that the conveyor will move at a speed of 23 feet per second (7 m/s), which equates to 16 miles per hour (25 km/h))
- Gauge of maintenance railway - 2 feet 11.44 inches (900 mm)

The original plans detailed a tunnel with an internal diameter that was 14 feet (4.4 m) with a tunnel lining of 9.8 inches (250 mm). This was increased to a diameter of 16 feet (4.9 m) with a tunnel lining of 14 inches (350 mm). The overall diameter of the tunnel will be 20 feet (6 m). This also increased the cost of the whole project (including sinking the mineshafts) from £3.6 billion to £4.2 billion. The increase in diameter has also led to a slower progress rate than before; the TBMs tunnelling would be reduced from covering 66 feet (20 m) to 56 feet (17 m) per day. The average depth of the tunnel will be 820 feet (250 m) as it makes its way north eastwards towards Wilton.

The 47-inch (1,200 mm) wide conveyor will transport the mineral at the rate of 13 miles per hour (21 km/h) with a changeover between conveyors at the Lockwood Access Site. The Mineral Transport System (MTS) will consist of the longest underground conveyor in the world. The tunnel will also include an access railway for maintenance crews, an 11 kilovolt power system for the conveyor, fibre optic cables, a pumping main and a 66 kilovolt feeder cable to supply the mine site from Wilton. This is needed as there are no National Grid power sources near to the mine site.

Planning documents assume the gauge of the railway to be 2 feet 11.44 inches (900 mm), which was later confirmed to be the accurate gauge, and the caverns where the crossovers are located will also be furnished with sidings. A train maintenance depot will be sited at the Wilton end of the tunnel. In November 2021, two of the maintenance trains crashed causing damage to the tunnel concrete segments.

== See also ==
- List of longest tunnels
- List of tunnels by location
