= UK Dark Matter Collaboration =

1987–2007 particle physics experiment

Coordinates: 54.5534°N 0.8245°W

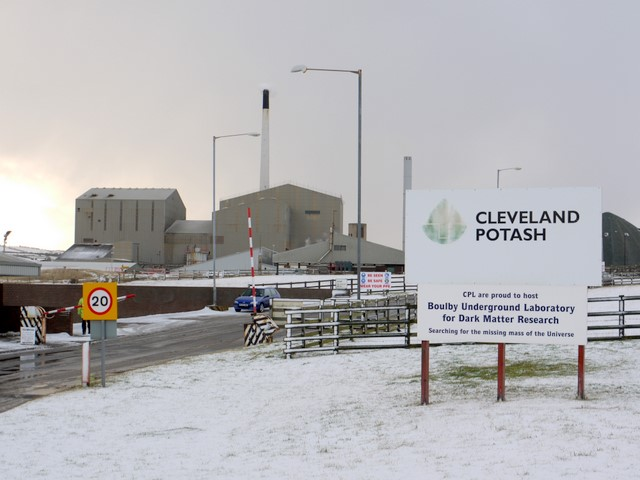
Entrance to Boulby Mine, with UKDMC sign

The UK Dark Matter Collaboration (UKDMC) (1987–2007) was an experiment to search for weakly interacting massive particles (WIMPs). The consortium consisted of astrophysicists and particle physicists from the United Kingdom, who conducted experiments with the ultimate goal of detecting rare scattering events which would occur if galactic dark matter consists largely of a new heavy neutral particle. Detectors were set up 1,100 m (3,600 ft) underground in a halite seam at the Boulby Mine in North Yorkshire.

== Background ==
WIMPs are considered prime candidates for dark matter, which accounts for approximately nine-tenths of the mass of certain galaxies, such as the Milky Way. WIMPs are predicted by several supersymmetric theories of particle physics. The particle detectors used for this experiment are placed 1100 metres below the surface of Yorkshire's Boulby mine.

== History ==
UKDMC began in 1987, with principal participants from several notable institutions, including the Imperial College of Science, Technology and Medicine, the CCLRC's Rutherford Appleton Laboratory, and the University of Sheffield. Funding for the programme was provided by the Particle Physics and Astronomy Research Council (PPARC), as well as Cleveland Potash Ltd. which operates the mine where the experiments were conducted. The underground laboratory was officially opened on 18 April 2003, and the experiment ran until 2007 when collaborating institutions and scientists moved on to the related projects ZEPLIN-III and DRIFT-II.

== Experiments ==
UKDMC operated multiple dark matter detectors and developed techniques for WIMP searches in crystals and xenon.

In 1996 they published limits that were obtained using room temperature crystals. NAIAD was an array of NaI(Tl) crystals that ran 2001–2003, collecting 44.9 kg×years of exposure, setting spin-independent and spin-dependent limits on WIMPs. Then the ZEPLIN series of searches were done.
