= ZEPLIN-III =

2006–2011 dark matter experiment in England

Coordinates: 54.5534°N 0.8245°W

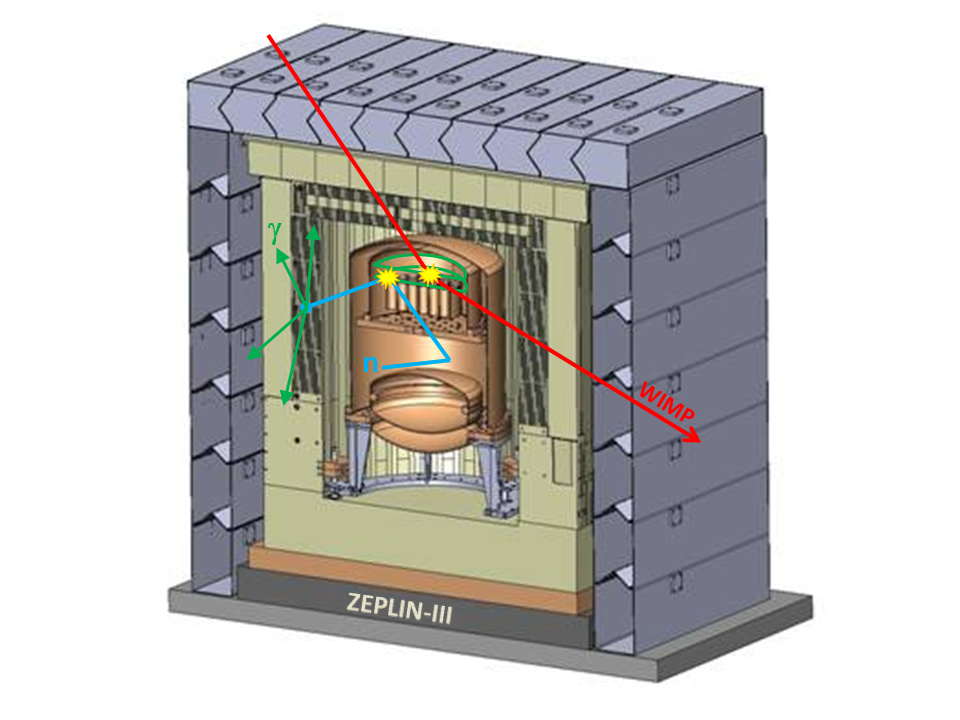
ZEPLIN-III experiment: the WIMP detector, built mainly out of copper, included two chambers within a cryostat vessel: the upper one contained 12 kg of active liquid xenon; an array of 31 photomultipliers operated immersed in the liquid to detect prompt scintillation as well as delayed electroluminescence from a thin gas layer above the liquid. The lower chamber contained liquid nitrogen to provide cooling. The detector was surrounded by Gd-loaded polypropylene to moderate and capture neutrons, a potential source of background. The gamma-rays from neutron capture were detected by 52 modules of plastic scintillator placed around the moderator. The shielding was completed by a 20-cm thick lead castle.

The ZEPLIN-III dark matter experiment attempted to detect galactic WIMPs using a 12 kg liquid xenon target. It operated from 2006 to 2011 at the Boulby Underground Laboratory in Loftus, North Yorkshire. This was the last in a series of xenon-based experiments in the ZEPLIN programme pursued originally by the UK Dark Matter Collaboration (UKDMC). The ZEPLIN-III project was led by Imperial College London and also included the Rutherford Appleton Laboratory and the University of Edinburgh in the UK, as well as LIP-Coimbra in Portugal and ITEP-Moscow in Russia. It ruled out cross-sections for elastic scattering of WIMPs off nucleons above 3.9 × 10^{−8} pb (3.9 × 10^{−44} cm^{2}) from the two science runs conducted at Boulby (83 days in 2008 and 319 days in 2010/11).

Direct dark matter search experiments look for extremely rare and very weak collisions expected to occur between the cold dark matter particles that are believed to permeate our galaxy and the nuclei of atoms in the active medium of a radiation detector. These hypothetical elementary particles could be Weakly Interacting Massive Particles, or WIMPs, weighing as little as a few protons or as much as several heavy nuclei. Their nature is not yet known, but no sensible candidates remain within the Standard Model of particle physics to explain the dark matter problem.

== Detection technology ==
Condensed noble gases, most notably liquid xenon and liquid argon, are excellent radiation detection media. They can produce two signatures for each particle interaction: a fast flash of light (scintillation) and the local release of charge (ionisation). In two-phase xenon – so called since it involves liquid and gas phases in equilibrium – the scintillation light produced by an interaction in the liquid is detected directly with photomultiplier tubes; the ionisation electrons released at the interaction site are drifted up to the liquid surface under an external electric field, and subsequently emitted into a thin layer of xenon vapour. Once in the gas, they generate a second, larger pulse of light (electroluminescence or proportional scintillation), which is detected by the same array of photomultipliers. These systems are also known as xenon 'emission detectors'.

This configuration is that of a time projection chamber (TPC); it allows three-dimensional reconstruction of the interaction site, since the depth coordinate (z) can be measured very accurately from the time separation between the two light pulses. The horizontal coordinates can be reconstructed from the hit pattern in the photomultiplier array(s). Critically for WIMP searches, the ratio between the two response channels (scintillation and ionisation) allows the rejection of the predominant backgrounds for WIMP searches: gamma and beta radiation from trace radioactivity in detector materials and the immediate surroundings. WIMP candidate events produce lower ionisation/scintillation ratios than the more prevalent background interactions.

The ZEPLIN programme pioneered the use of two-phase technology for WIMP searches. The technique itself, however, was first developed for radiation detection using argon in the early 1970s. Lebedenko, one of its pioneers at the Moscow Engineering Physics Institute, was involved in building ZEPLIN-III in the UK from 2001. Developed alongside it, but on a faster timescale, ZEPLIN-II was the first such WIMP detector to operate in the world (2005). This technology was also adopted very successfully by the XENON programme. Two-phase argon has also been used for dark matter searches by the WARP collaboration and ArDM. LUX is developing similar systems that have set improved limits.

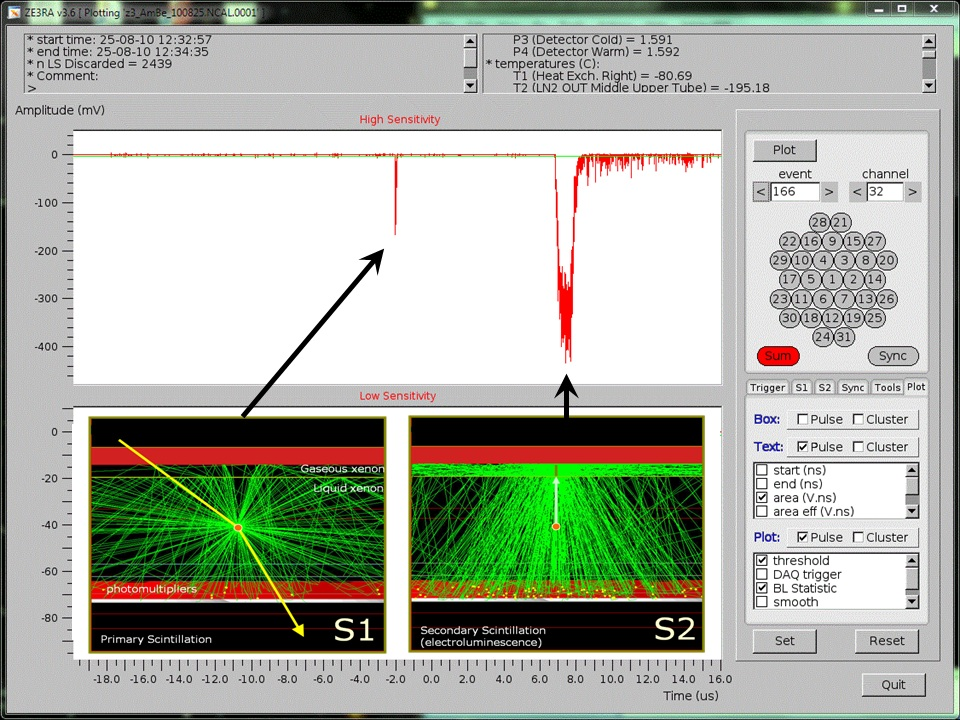
Signal from ZEPLIN-III two-phase xenon detector. The fast scintillation pulse (S1) is generated promptly by scintillation in the liquid; a larger, delayed pulse (S2) is obtained once the ionisation drifted from the interaction site is emitted into the thin gas phase above the liquid. The insets below the signal traces show Monte Carlo simulation of the optical signals.

== History ==
The ZEPLIN (ZonEd Proportional scintillation in LIquid Noble gases) series of experiments was a progressive programme pursued by the UK Dark Matter Collaboration using liquid xenon. It evolved alongside the DRIFT programme which promoted the use of gas-filled TPCs to recover directional information on WIMP scattering. In the late 1980s the UKDMC had explored the potential of different materials and techniques, including cryogenic LiF, CaF_{2}, silicon and germanium, from which a programme emerged at Boulby based on room-temperature NaI(Tl) scintillators. The subsequent move to a new target material, liquid xenon, was motivated by the realisation that noble liquid targets are inherently more scalable and could achieve lower energy thresholds and better background discrimination. In particular, external layers of the bulk target, affected more by external backgrounds, can be sacrificed during data analysis if the position of the interactions in known; this leaves an inner fiducial volume with potentially very low background rates. This self-shielding effect (alluded to by the 'zoned' term in the contrived ZEPLIN acronym) explains the faster gain in sensitivity of these targets compared to technologies based on a modular approach adopted with crystal detectors, where each module brings its own background.

ZEPLIN-I, a 3 kg liquid xenon target, operated at Boulby from the late 1990s. It used pulse shape discrimination for background rejection, exploiting a small but helpful difference between the timing properties of the scintillation light caused by WIMPs and background interactions. This was followed by two-phase systems ZEPLIN-II and ZEPLIN-III, which were designed and built in parallel at RAL/UCLA and Imperial College, respectively.

ZEPLIN-II was the first two-phase system deployed to search for dark matter in the world; it consisted of a 30 kg liquid xenon target topped by a 3 mm layer of gas in a so-called three-electrode configuration: separate electric fields were applied to the bulk of the liquid (WIMP target) and to the gas region above it by using an extra electrode underneath the liquid surface (in addition to an anode grid, located above the gas, and a cathode, at the bottom of the chamber). In ZEPLIN-II an array of 7 photomultipliers viewed the chamber from above in the gas phase.

ZEPLIN-III was proposed in the late 1990s, based partly on a similar concept developed at ITEP, and built by Prof. Tim Sumner and his team at Imperial College. It was deployed underground at Boulby in late 2006, where it operated until 2011. It was a two-electrode chamber, where electron emission into the gas was achieved by a strong (4 kV/cm) field in the liquid bulk rather than by an additional electrode. The photomultiplier array contained 31 photon detectors viewing the WIMP target from below, immersed in the cold liquid xenon.

ZEPLIN–II and –III were purposely designed in different ways, so that the technologies employed in each sub-system could be appraised and selected for the final experiment proposed by the UKDMC: a tonne-scale xenon target (ZEPLIN-MAX) capable of probing most of the parameter space favored by theory at that point (1 × 10^{−10} pb), although this latter system was never built in the UK for lack of funding.

== Results ==
Although the ZEPLIN-III liquid xenon target was built on the same scale as that of its ZEPLIN predecessors, it achieved significant improvements in WIMP sensitivity due to the higher discrimination factor achieved and to a lower overall background. In 2011 it published exclusion limits on the spin-independent WIMP-nucleon elastic scattering cross-section above 3.9 × 10^{−8} pb for a 50 GeV WIMP mass. Although not as stringent as results from XENON100, this was achieved with a 10 times smaller fiducial mass and demonstrated the best background discrimination ever achieved in these detectors. The WIMP-neutron spin-dependent cross-section was excluded above 8.0 × 10^{−3} pb. It also ruled out an inelastic WIMP scattering model which attempted to reconcile a positive claim from DAMA with the absence of signal in other experiments.
