= Boulby Mine =

Mineral mine in North Yorkshire, England

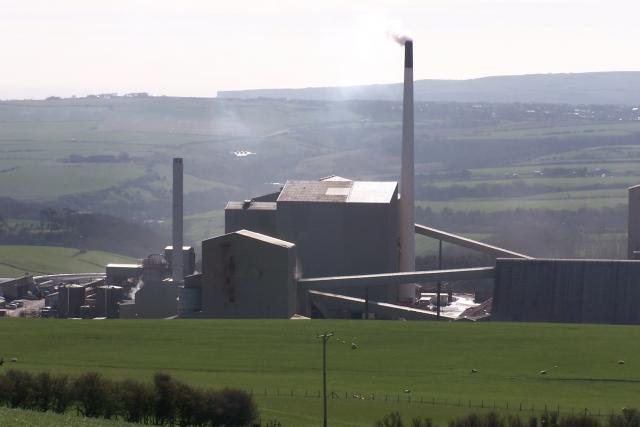
- Surface workings at Boulby Mine

- Location within the ceremonial county of North Yorkshire
- Location: Loftus, Saltburn-by-the-Sea, North Yorkshire, England; 54.5534°N 0.8245°W
- Products: Polyhalite; Rock salt PotashPluS
- Production: Polyhalite 1,009,000 tonnes (1,112,000 tons)
- Financial year: 2023
- Type: Underground
- Greatest depth: 4,600 feet (1,400 m)
- Opened: 1968 shaft sinking 1973 first shaft production 1976 full production
- Company: Israel Chemicals
- Website: Official website
- Acquired: 2002

The Boulby Mine is an underground mining operation with surface facilities located just south-east of the village of Boulby, on the north-east coast of the North York Moors, 2.7 miles (4.3 km) east of Loftus, North Yorkshire. It is operated by Cleveland Potash Limited, a subsidiary of Israel Chemicals Ltd., ICL, which acquired the project from Anglo American plc in April 2002.

In early 2016, polyhalite mining commenced. Polyhalite is a natural multi-nutrient fertiliser providing a source of potassium, calcium, magnesium, and sulphur. It is marketed as Polysulphate by ICL and is sold in three forms: granular, mini-granular and standard.

As well as producing Polysulphate, a granulated blend of potash and Polysulphate is sold as PotashPluS – part of ICL's wider FertiliserPluS product spectrum.

Boulby originally produced half of the United Kingdom's output of potash, an agricultural fertiliser. The mined ore consists of 35–45% sylvite ("potash", specifically potassium chloride) and 45–55% halite (rock salt, or sodium chloride). The rock salt is extracted as a by-product and used across the region as a de-icing agent on roads in winter conditions.

Other minerals are produced as waste (gangue) to the main effort, but may be sought after by mineral collectors, such as boracite, which occurs just above the beds of potash.

== History ==
In 1939, potash was discovered in the area at Aislaby when prospectors were drilling to look for oil. The reserves were investigated in the 1950s but appeared too deep to exploit economically. Solution mining was considered from 1962, but not pursued.

The first shaft was begun in 1968 and Imperial Chemical Industries (ICI) began construction on the mine in 1969, with potash being produced from one shaft in 1973. Full production of the mine commenced in 1976. The mine was the source of all UK-produced potash – around 55 percent of the total UK market. The ore horizon occurs between 1.2 and 1.5 km (0.75 and 0.93 mi) below ground with an average seam thickness of 7 m (23 ft). The mine did not achieve profitability until 1984.

ICI formed Cleveland Potash Limited jointly with Anglo American, and later sold it to them, which in turn divested it to Israel Chemicals Ltd in 2002.

In April 2011, the mine began the world's first commercial production of polyhalite, a rare mineral that has been found in large quantities in a seam out to sea from the mine, with total resources estimated at over a billion tonnes lying more than 0.93 miles (1.5 km) offshore. The mineral has commercial potential as an inorganic fertiliser.

In April 2014, Cleveland Potash was awarded a £4.9 million government grant to support the mining of polyhalite at the Boulby site and parent company Israel Chemicals Ltd has pledged to invest £300 million in the area before 2018.

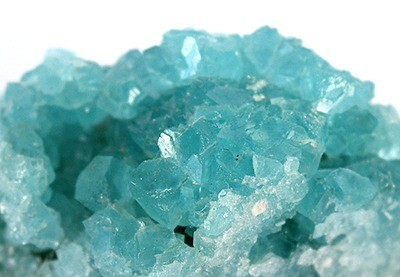
Green-blue boracite crystals from the Boulby Mine. Size: 4.0 × 2.4 × 2.0 cm

Plans include extending the mine to the east and upgrading facilities to increase production capacity. Environmental groups have raised concerns that the development could have an intrusive effect on the local area.

The mine had 1,001 employees in 2013 and can produce up to one million tonnes of potash each year. At 1,400 metres (4,600 ft) deep, it is the second deepest mine of any kind in Europe, and has a network of underground roads extending under the North Sea, totalling 1,000 kilometres (620 mi) in length. Due to the mine's depth it takes workers seven minutes travelling in a lift to reach the bottom of the mine.

Cleveland Potash Limited had a reported turnover of £194 million in 2013, up from £162 million the year before. However, despite the increased turnover, the company suffered a total pre-tax loss of £194 million. This was the result of a huge £200 million impairment charge arising from a significant fall in potash prices. In the 2017–18 financial year, the company made £92 million, down from £205 million from the previous financial year. During the same period they also incurred losses of £162 million due to an investment in ICL Iberia a sister company. Taking into account redundancies, impairment of assets and disposal of unrequired assets, the loss was adjusted to £38 million.

By the end of 2018, the company had 470 employees after a round of job cuts related to the switch from mining potash to polyhalite.

In 2023, the mine produced 1,009,000 tonnes (1,112,000 tons) of polyhalite, an increase on the 2022 production of 953,000 tonnes (1,051,000 tons).

== Transport ==
Much of the output from the mine is transported by rail, as the site is located east of Loftus along the route of the former WRMU (Whitby Redcar and Middlesbrough Union Railway), which was closed on 5 May 1958. The line remains open from Saltburn to Boulby for goods traffic. Teesport handles most of the bulk cargo export from the mine, via a specific potash and rock salt terminal.

== Underground laboratory ==
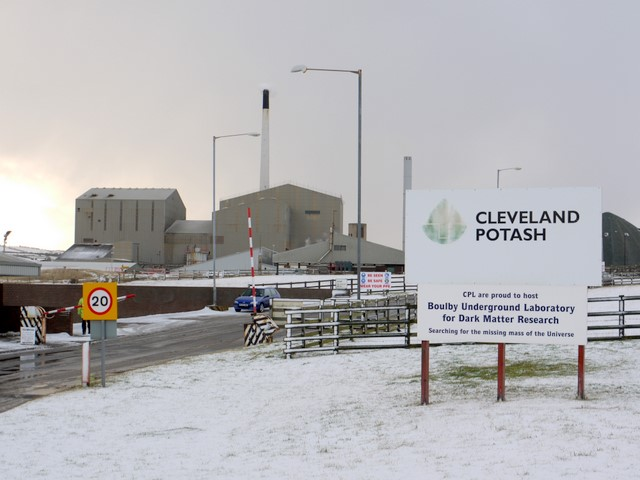
Entrance to the mine, with signage for the laboratory

Because of its depth, Boulby Mine is the site of the Boulby Underground Laboratory 3,600 feet (1,100 m) below the surface (2800 metre water equivalent). Part of the laboratory is called Palmer Lab (subterranean) and the laboratory's surface facilities are sometimes called the John Barton surface facility.

Work being carried out at the underground laboratory includes the UK Centre for Astrobiology study of extremophile organisms that can survive in a salt-rich environment. The site is also used for testing NASA Mars rovers.

In October 2017, the European Space Agency (ESA) sent astronaut Matthias Maurer as part of the fifth Mine Analogue Research sortie. It is thought that the brines present in the mine may be able to support extremophiles, and be like similar sites in caves on other planets.

Extant testing and recording programmes at the laboratory include:

- BUGS or BUGs (Boulby Underground Germanium Suite; also used to be called Boulby-Ge): Ultra-low background material screening of germanium for development of dark matter experiments
- UltraLO-1800 equipment: For study of radioactivity of the surface layers of materials (surface screening) with aim to aid in development of dark matter experiments
- SELLR (Subsurface Experiment of Life in Low Radiation): an experiment studying the effect of low-radiation environment to biological systems
- Deep Carbon, MuScan, Muon-Tides (3 experiments): Muon Tomography
- DRIFT-II (Directional Recoil Identification From Tracks): dark matter experiment. One of the experiments detectors, the DRIFT-IIb, is located at Boulby. A low pressure negative ion time projection chamber (NITPC) designed to detect weakly interacting massive particles (WIMPs, a prime dark matter candidate), a second detector (DRIFT-IIc) is located on the surface at Occidental College, Los Angeles, California, USA.
- BISAL (Boulby International Subsurface Astrobiology Lab): Geomicrobiology / Astrobiology studies
- MINAR (MINe Analogue Research): Space exploration technology development

There are also concurrent geological and geoscience projects ongoing.

Previous, now completed experiments include:

- ZEPLIN: dark matter experiment(s). The final ZEPLIN experiment, ZEPLIN-III finished in 2011.
- DRIFT-I: dark matter experiment
- DM-Ice: dark matter experiment
- ERSaB: Environmental gamma spectroscopy
- SKY, SKY ZERO (multiple experiments in the same SKY-experiment series): study if ionisation by cosmic rays induced aerosol nucleation & growth
- UK Dark Matter Collaboration: dark matter experiment
- NAIAD: dark matter experiment

== Health and safety ==
Since the year 2000, there have been several incidents at the mine. Cleveland Potash Limited has been served with 11 notices for breaches of health and safety procedures by the Health and Safety Executive since 2012. They include not taking appropriate measures to protect workers from the risks of explosion, falling ground and inadvertent entry into the mine shaft. Other incidents include;

- 2001 – an electrician suffered severe burns to his face during routine maintenance work.
- 2003 – a lorry driver was trapped under a vehicle for over an hour whilst working underground.
- 2007 – 24-year-old miner Darren Compton was killed by falling rock. He had been operating equipment supporting a sidewall in a recently mined roadway.
- 2012 – a 50-year-old man suffered chest injuries when a hose burst and forced him against a skip.
- April 2014 – there was a collapse at the mine caused by a falling boulder.
- June 2014 – an employment tribunal revealed that the Boulby mine would have been unable to cope in an emergency. A former rescue team coordinator, Steve Angus, was fired after failing to ensure enough safety officers were trained to respond. He was also accused of failing to maintain the required standard of breathing apparatus.
- 13 April 2016 – Seven workers were hospitalised for smoke inhalation when polystyrene blocks caught fire 3,600 feet (1,100 m) under the sea and 5 miles (8 km) from land.
- 17 June 2016 – a miner, 55-year-old John Anderson, was killed in a "gas blow-out" while working in the mine.

== See also ==
- Winsford – home of Britain's largest rock salt mine
- Woodsmith Mine – a new polyhalite mine under construction just south of Whitby
- Polysulphate – new inorganic fertilizer

== Sources ==
- British Geological Survey (2011). Mineral Profiles: Potash (PDF) (Report). Keyworth, Nottinghamshire: British Geological Survey.
