= Redcar Bulk Terminal =

Deep sea East Coast port in Redcar and Cleveland, Northern England

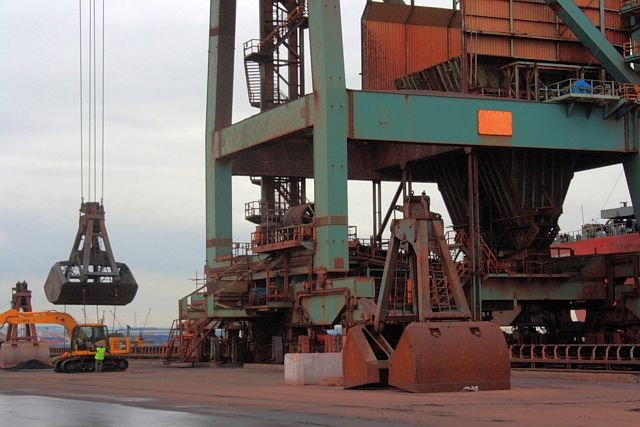
- Bulk Ore Terminal, Redcar
- Interactive map of Redcar Bulk Terminal
- Location in North Yorkshire

Location
- Country: England
- Location: Redcar
- Coordinates: 54°37′28.2″N 1°09′09.7″W
- UN/LOCODE: GB RER

Details
- Opened: 1973 (rebuilt)
- Owned by: SSI UK in liquidation
- Land area: 320 acres (130 ha)
- Draft depth: 17 metres (56 ft)
- Employees: 89 (2019)
- Rail mounted gantry cranes: 2

Statistics
- Annual cargo tonnage: 3,000,000 tonnes (3,300,000 tons)
- Passenger traffic: None
- Website; Official website

Redcar Bulk Terminal (RBT), also known as Redcar Ore Terminal, is a privately run dock at the mouth of the Tees Estuary in North Yorkshire, England. The port is used for the transhipment of coal and coke (both inward and outward flows) and for many years was the import dock for iron ore destined for Redcar Steelworks under British Steel Corporation, British Steel plc, Corus, Tata Steel Europe and Sahaviriya Steel Industries (SSI UK).

The port is not part of the Teesport estate run by PD Ports but is instead owned by SSI UK (in liquidation). It is one of only four UK ports capable of handling Capesize vessels.

== History ==
Located in the borough of Redcar and Cleveland in the ceremonial county of North Yorkshire, the bulk terminal is on the south bank of the River Tees. It is the deepest part of the Teesport area and the deepest port (56 feet (17 m)) in eastern England. The port can handle Panamax and Capesize vessels, with Redcar being only one of four that can take the Capesize vessels in the United Kingdom.

The site at Redcar had been used as a dock since the 1850s, and had also been investigated by the Shell oil company as a possible site for their operations. Still, despite an optimistic assessment by a hydraulics engineering company, Shell did not build on the site, with their operations being located further upstream. Sir W Halcrow chose the site, and the new terminal was announced in 1969 when it was also considered as a point of import for iron ore for the Scunthorpe Steelworks, but British Steel Corporation (BSC) opened a second iron ore dock at Immingham to supply the Lincolnshire side of its operations. Whilst primarily an import terminal for Teesside, the terminal began running trains to Consett Steelworks in 1974 for BSC instead of those trains originating in Tyneside.

Between 1969 and 1972, an area covering over 645,835 square feet (60,000 m^{2}) was excavated with depths up to 148 feet (45 m). The company created the bulk import terminal to supply the adjacent Redcar Steelworks, which had been opened in 1917 by Dorman Long and became part of British Steel Corporation in 1967. £15 million was spent locating the port on the edge of the 1,500-acre (610 ha) Redcar steel estate which could accommodate vessels of between 150,000 tonnes (170,000 tons) and 200,000 tonnes (220,000 tons) whereas before that, the maximum deadweight (DWT) that could be offloaded at the site was 30,000 tonnes (33,000 tons). An enlarged Redcar port with a 1,048-foot (319 m) quay was opened by the British Steel Corporation (BSC) in 1973 after it had developed the dock area and had the River Tees deepened.

The first vessel to dock there was the "Owari Maru" on 6 September 1973, a 106,000-tonne (117,000-ton) ship carrying iron ore for the Redcar steelworks.

BSC was privatised into British Steel in 1988, and when British Steel merged with Koninklijke Hoogovens in 1999, the new venture, named Corus, used the facility for the importation of iron ore and coal for the Redcar steelworks. Both Tata and latterly, SSSI (the subsequent owners of the steelworks) used the dock to import raw materials. An average of 8,000,000 tonnes (8,800,000 tons) of iron ore per annum was imported through the dock in the 2000–2009 period. In 2009, the steelworks were closed, but Tata retained control of the dock. When the steelworks site was handed over to SSI in 2011, Tata retained a joint stake in the dock to allow them the flexibility to import coal and iron ore if necessary.

Tata Steel's 50% stake in the venture was later sold to British Steel Limited in 2017, but in February 2020, this was acquired by SSI, therefore returning the terminal to unified ownership under the Official Receiver (administering SSI UK since its 2015 liquidation). However, the berth itself is owned by PD Ports.

The port lost a huge tonnage of its business when the adjacent SSI steel plant was mothballed in 2015. Since then, it has handled between 2,000,000 tonnes (2,200,000 tons) and 3,000,000 tonnes (3,300,000 tons) of trade per year, though the complex can handle 12,000,000 tonnes (13,000,000 tons). The terminal can unload from a train and load onto another train simultaneously. It also has over 8 miles (13 km) of sidings with over 70% of its business arriving or leaving by rail.

In 2019, RBT covered an area of 320 acres (130 ha) and had a connection to the railway lines on South Teesside. The terminal has previously dispatched trainloads of coal for power stations via many freight operating companies. Imported coal has been moved to power stations (Fiddlers Ferry in 2016, for example) and forwarded to Redcar from opencast sites in Scotland for export. Due to a downturn in ESI coal imports, trainloads of coal have dropped from 50 per week in 2013 to 15 per week in 2019. The terminal has also been used to import Ground Granulated Blast Furnace Slag (GGBS) to Scunthorpe and as a forwarding point for unused iron ore since the adjacent steelworks closed in 2009 and 2015.

== Key products ==
The letter after the product indicates whether it is imported (I) or exported (E).

- Coal (E future) (I)
- Coke (E) (I)
- GGBS (I)
- Iron ore (1972-2015) (I)
- Petroleum coke (Petcoke) (I)
- Polyhalite (future) (E)
- Scrap metal (E)

Redcar is preferred for exporting metallurgical coal (for coking) from the Woodhouse Colliery site in West Cumbria. Up to six trains daily would run between Whitehaven and Redcar, delivering the coal.

In July 2018, Sirius Minerals, the operators of Woodsmith Mine, signed an agreement to export up to 10,000,000 tonnes (11,000,000 tons) of polyhalite per year from Redcar. The mineral would arrive at the Bran Sands site via a 23-mile (37 km) underground conveyor belt from the Woodsmith Mine site. RBT would then store and export the mineral via its quayside.
