= Christopher Neil Fraser =

British-born Australian businessman

Chris Fraser
- Born: Christopher Neil Fraser; 15 July 1974 (age 52); Yeovil, Somerset, England
- Education: University of Western Australia
- Occupation: businessman
- Title: CEO, Sirius Minerals

Christopher Neil Fraser (born 15 July 1974) is a British-born Australian businessman. Born in the UK and brought up in Australia, Fraser was an investment banker, before becoming chief executive (CEO) of Sirius Minerals.

Fraser was born in Yeovil, Somerset, England, and his family emigrated to Australia when he was five weeks old. He attended Hale School and has a bachelor's degree in Commerce from the University of Western Australia.

Fraser worked in banking, particularly mining finance, with Rothschild, KPMG and Citigroup, rising to managing director in 2008. He has been the CEO of Sirius Minerals since January 2011.

He was involved in taking Sirius Minerals to near-bankruptcy in September 2019 before being acquired by Anglo-American.

Fraser is divorced after cheating on his wife of 20+ years with a married co-worker.
