= Wolf Minerals =

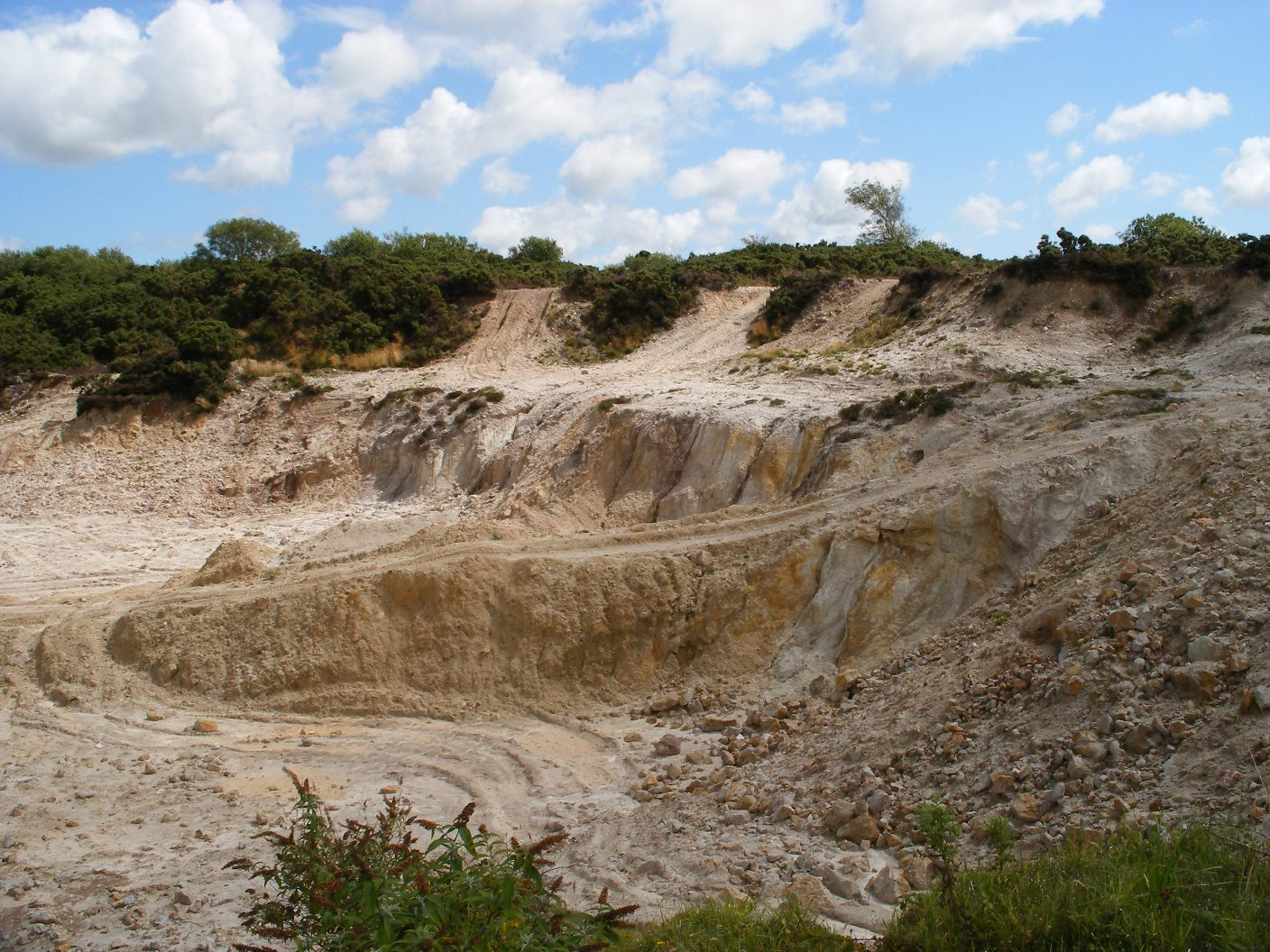
- The old main pit at Drakelands Mine
- Type: Public
- Traded as: AIM: WLFE ASX: WLF
- Industry: Metals and Mining
- Founded: 2007
- Defunct: 2018
- Fate: Bankruptcy
- Headquarters: Perth, Australia
- Products: Tungsten, Tin
- Website: wolfminerals.com.au

Wolf Minerals Limited was an ASX (WLF) and AIM (WLFE) listed specialty metals company focused on developing the Drakelands Mine tungsten and tin project, in Devon in the UK.

The company was listed on the ASX in February 2007. Later that year, the company acquired the Hemerdon project which was later renamed Drakelands Mine. In 2011, Wolf Minerals completed a Definitive Feasibility Study which confirmed the Hemerdon project's robust economics. With global tungsten demand at that time forecast to grow by more than 50% between 2010 and 2015, Wolf was well placed to capitalise on tungsten's status as one of the European Union's 14 ‘critical’ metals.

The project was developed as a low-cost, large-scale open-pit tungsten and tin mining operation, and was to become the world's next major new tungsten mine. All required permits for the project were in place and production commenced in 2015.

The Hemerdon deposit contains one of the largest tungsten and tin resources in the world and is rated by the British Geological Survey as the world's fourth-largest tungsten deposit. A tin concentrate was also to be produced, which to generate valuable additional revenue. The project was expected to create about 200 direct jobs and inject hundreds of millions of pounds into the Plymouth, Devon and UK economies over the decade.

Wolf Minerals was focused on developing a major tungsten and tin mining operation in the UK. It was listed on the Australian Stock Exchange after its IPO in 2007. It was listed on the London Stock Exchange's Alternative Investment Market in November 2011.

The company developed the Drakelands Mine in Devon, United Kingdom, which is one of the oldest mines in the UK.

== Company history ==
Wolf Minerals was incorporated on 20 September 2006 as a metals exploration and development company. It commenced trading on the ASX on 15 February 2007 after raising $3 million in an IPO. The Company was the best performing IPO on the ASX for 2007. On 5 December 2007 Wolf signed an option and lease agreement for the mineral rights and the rights to mine the Hemerdon tungsten and tin project near Plymouth, in Devon, in the southwest of UK.

In May 2011, Wolf released a Definitive Feasibility Study (DFS), which confirmed the project's economics and development potential as a major, new global source of tungsten supply. All required permits to develop the project were in place and major contracts to build and operate the mine were awarded.

The project ran into difficulty and failed to live up to its expectation right from the beginning. A poorly designed feasibility study underestimated the friability of the ore. After years of struggling to achieve the expected tungsten and tin recovery, the company went into liquidation. In November 2018, it was announced that Pala Investments may provide funds for Wolf Minerals' Hemerdon Project after Wolf Minerals went into liquidation. The company went bankrupt in 2018.

== The Hemerdon Project ==
The Tungsten and Tin Project was Wolf Minerals' core asset. It is located near Plymouth in the County of Devon in the southwest of the UK.

At the time, Wolf identified the Hemerdon project as a potentially major new source of global tungsten supply. It acquired the project in December 2007 and has conducted extensive exploration programs and established a large JORC Resource inventory and completed a successful Definitive Feasibility Study, in 2011. The DFS identified Hemerdon as a highly economic potential producer of low-cost tungsten and was based on a two-stage open pit with an initial 10-year life, and a 3Mtpa concentrator with associated infrastructure. The open-pit dimensions are 800m in length x 450m in width x 230m in depth. Wolf awarded all major contracts for the project; the Engineering-Procurement-Construction (EPC) contract was awarded the GR Engineering Services Ltd (ASX: GNG) and the Mining Services contract (with the exception of Drill & Blast) was awarded to CA Blackwell (Contracts) Ltd. All permits required to develop and operate the mine were in place. Production commenced in 2015.

The mineralisation is characterised by sheeted greisen veining and stockworks containing wolframite and cassiterite. The vein system is hosted within a dyke-like granite body. The mineralisation starts from the surface and is contained within the steeply dipping granite body flanked by metamorphosed sediments.

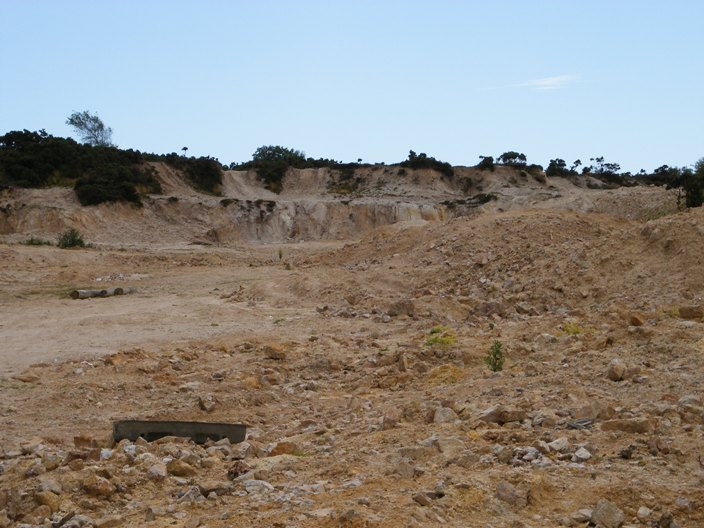
Another view of the Main Opencast

== Board and management ==
The Management and Board of Wolf had extensive technical and corporate experience in the minerals sector. Their collective skills and expertise was a key driver in the initial success of the Company since its listing in 2007. However, the Hemerdon project failed to live to its expectations and the company went into liquidation in 2018
