= Hemerdon Mine =

Tungsten and tin mine in Devon, England

- The main open cast quarry

- Location in the county of Devon
- Location: Hemerdon, near Plympton, United Kingdom; 50°24′36″N 4°00′36″W
- Products: Tungsten, and Tin
- Type: Open-cast
- Discovered: 1867
- Active: 1918–9, 1941–4, 2015–8, 2026-
- Company: Tungsten West plc
- Website: tungstenwest.com
- Acquired: 2019

Hemerdon Mine, also known as Hemerdon Ball Mine, Hemerdon Bal Mine and (briefly) previously as Drakelands Mine (Note: Tungsten West, the present owner, calls it Hemerdon Mine. Hemerdon Ball is also spelled Hemerdon Bal (with one 'l').) is a tungsten and tin mine. It is located 11 km (7 miles) northeast of Plymouth, near Plympton, in Devon, England. It lies to the north of the villages of Sparkwell and Hemerdon, and adjacent to the large china clay pits near Lee Moor. The mine had been out of operation since 1944, except for the brief operation of a trial mine in the 1980s. Work started to re-open it in 2014, but it ceased activities in 2018. It hosts the fourth largest tungsten deposit in the world.

A new company, Tungsten West plc acquired the site in 2019. A ground up review led to the recognition that the ore is not wolframite, but is in fact a related ore, ferberite, and changes were needed to improve extraction efficiencies. In addition, a subsidiary will enhance the mine with aggregate sales as a by-product of mining.

Processing plant c.2020

The operation has re-entered production as of 2026, with its strategic importance to critical mineral supply security cited as a major factor in achieving £71 million funding from the National Wealth Fund. The mine was designated as a strategic project under the EU's critical mineral strategy in 2025. Tungsten prices have increased over 8x since 2024, with shortages linked to the wars in Iran and Ukraine and the Chinese export restrictions. The USA has now banned exports of tungsten scrap as a national defence measure. Over 80% of global production is controlled by North Korea, China and Russia.

== Geology ==
The Hemerdon deposit is centred upon a sub vertical, NNE-SSW striking, 100+ m wide Early Permian granite dyke hosted by Devonian metasedimentary and metavolcanic rocks. Mineralisation is overwhelmingly associated with moderately to steeply NW-dipping greisen-bordered quartz-ferberite± cassiterite sheeted veins. The resource size and dyke host are, to date, unique in SW England. The Hemerdon Ball granite is an outlying cupola intrusion surrounded by Devonian slates, known regionally as killas. Fractures in the granite and killas have been penetrated by mineralising fluids containing metallic ores in the area around the mine. Two types of vein are discernible with three different orientations. Quartz and quartz-feldspar veins form a stockwork with minor mineralisation, whilst greisen bordered veins are found in a sheeted vein system with ferberite and minor cassiterite mineralisation.

The mineralisation begins at surface and extends to depths of at least 400 metres (1,300 ft). The vein system is hosted in a dyke like granite body, extending from the Hemerdon Ball towards the Crownhill Down granite. It is flanked by killas, formed by contact metamorphism, which also contains veins although wolframite and cassiterite is found as a lower percentage of the rock bulk. Kaolinisation occurs to depths of up to 50 metres (160 ft) in the granitic body.

The locality is renowned for its high quality scorodite specimens, which are among the best in Europe. Pharmacosiderite, cassiterite, ferberite and wolframite of specimen quality have also been recovered from the mine. Scorodite and Pharmacosiderite are secondary arsenate minerals, that form in the upper oxidation zones of ore bodies. They are formed from alteration of arsenopyrite, and are found in the weathered zone of the deposit. At depths beneath the existing pit it is likely they will become scarce.

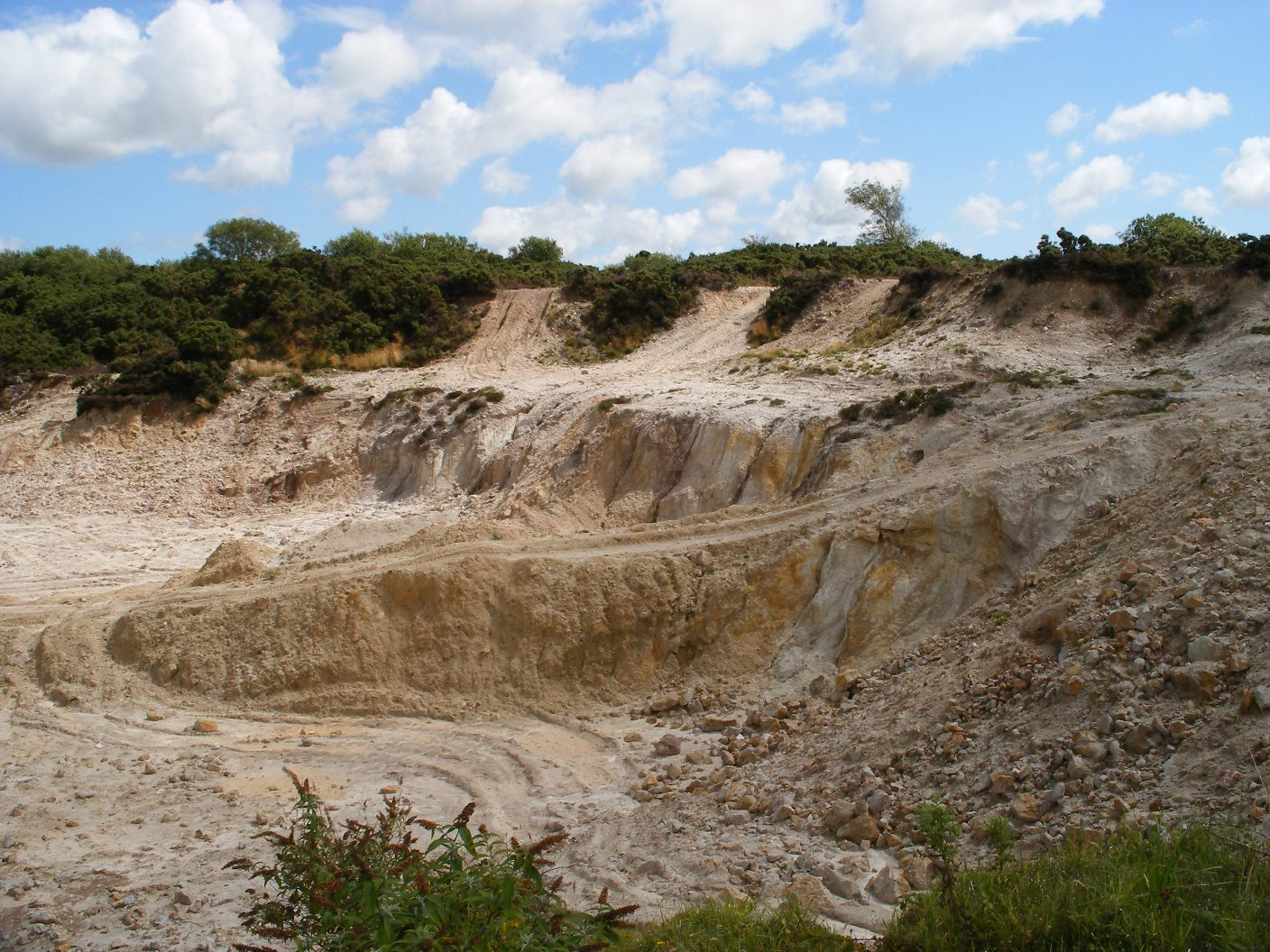
The main openpit c.2007

== History ==
=== 1867–1959 ===
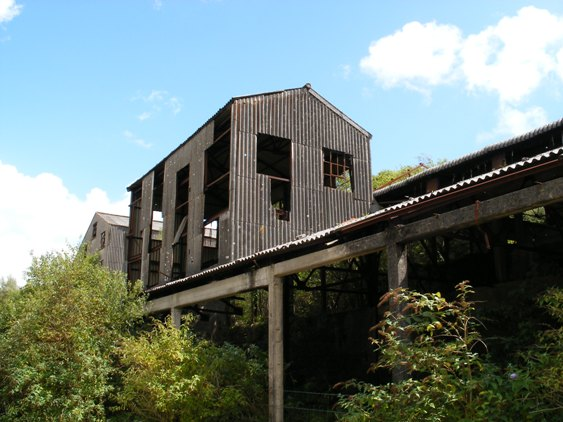
Historic process plant buildings c.2007

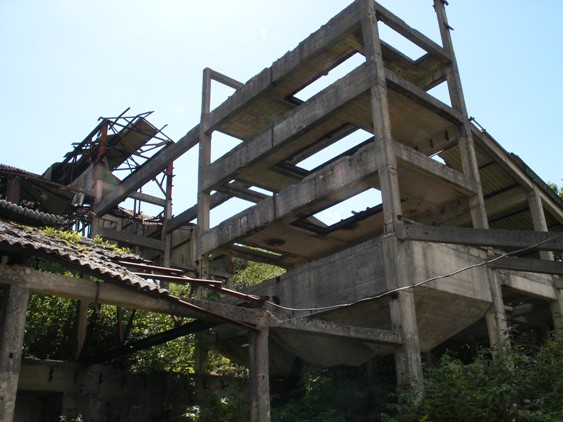
World War II mill structures

The Hemerdon tungsten-tin deposit was discovered in 1867. In 1916, due to war associated tungsten shortages, an exploration and development programme was initiated, which outlined a tin-tungsten stockwork suitable for open-cast extraction. In 1917, Hemerdon Mines Ltd decided to construct a 140,000-tonne per year mill, and shortly afterwards open-cast ore mining operations began. The mine was operated in 1918–1919, during which time it processed 16,000 tonnes of ore. When the British government stopped accepting tungsten ores under the war pricing scheme the mine was forced to suspend mining operations.

Several attempts were made to establish a higher and stable price for tungsten from the government, including an application supported by Winston Churchill for recognition of wolfram mining as a key industry. However, after further price decreases, milling operations were suspended and the mill components were sold off. In 1934 increased tungsten prices resulted in renewed prospecting of the deposit, along with metallurgical test work. In 1939 further shortages of tungsten due to WW2 led to Hemerdon Wolfram Ltd constructing a 90,000-tonne per year mill with 55% wolfram recovery, which began operation in 1941.

The Ministry of Supply carried out extensive evaluation of tungsten deposits in the UK, and it was concluded by 1942 that Hemerdon offered the most potential for producing tungsten on a large scale. The government took over the mine from Hemerdon Wolfram Ltd. A resource of 2.5 million tonnes of 0.14% tungsten trioxide in addition to tin was outlined, and a new plant was hastily constructed.

The new plant took over operation from the old plant in 1943, and theoretically should have been able to treat over 1 million tonnes per year; however labour shortages and mechanical faults resulted in a much lower production. Ore output from a mixture of underground and open-cast mining methods was documented as over 200,000 tonnes, with a resulting 180 tonnes of tin/tungsten concentrate during the period of government operation. Operations ceased in June 1944 due to access to overseas supplies being restored.

The plant was kept in place after the war, and the government was rumoured to have planned restarting production during the tungsten shortages associated with the Korean War. However, nothing came of this and following the Westwood Report in 1956, the government decided to seek a private partner to move the mine's development forwards. After further decreases in the tungsten price, resulting in the closure of the Castle-an-Dinas Mine tungsten mine in Cornwall, the government sold off all the plant in 1959.

=== 1960–2006 ===
However, in the mid-1960s work on the prospect was recommenced by British Tungsten Ltd, owned by Canadian entrepreneur W. A. Richardson. In 1969 a planning application for open-cast working of tin, tungsten and china clay was submitted, but it was withdrawn before a decision could be made. Further work commencing in 1970 by British Tungsten Ltd increased the resource to 5.6 million tonnes of ore.

The leases were transferred to Hemerdon Mining and Smelting Ltd in 1976. They initiated a drilling programme shortly before they entered a joint venture to develop the project with international mining firm AMAX in 1977. An extensive exploration programme costing in excess of $10 million was completed between 1978 and 1980. By the end of 1978, deeper drilling enlarged the resource size to 20 million tonnes of ore. In 1979 this was expanded to 45 million tonnes. At the end of the exploration programme in 1980, over 14,000 metres (46,000 ft) of diamond drilling had been undertaken, outlining a resource of 0.17% tungsten trioxide and 0.025% tin over 49.6 million tonnes.

Bulk sampling of the deposit using an underground drift for ore, and a pilot HMS and Gravity plant for processing, was undertaken in 1980. On average recoveries of around 65% were made, although in excess of 70% was achieved. The final revision of the mining feasibility study concluded in 1982 that a within a global resource of 73 million tonnes of ore, at grades of 0.143% tungsten trioxide and 0.026% tin, there was an in pit reserve of 38 million tonnes, at grades of 0.183% tungsten trioxide and 0.029% tin.

The venture was joined by Billiton Minerals Ltd, providing further finance and expertise, and forming a consortium that planned to commence production in 1986. The initial planning application was made in 1981, but a public enquiry and 'calling in' of the application by the Secretary of State resulted in an initial refusal of the application in 1984. This resulted in Billiton Minerals Ltd pulling out of the consortium. Hemerdon Mining and Smelting Ltd also sold their 50% stake in the project to AMAX. After making a revised application, permission was finally obtained in 1986. By then a collapse in the prices of both tin and tungsten had damaged the economic feasibility of making an investment in opening the mine. Its tungsten assets were passed on to a newly formed holding company, Canada Tungsten Ltd, in 1986.

Canada Tungsten implemented the planning permission that was obtained in 1986, and kept the project in its portfolio of prospects for many years. Before AMAX was sold to Phelps Dodge, it gradually transferred Canada Tungsten into the ownership of Aur Resources. In 1997, a new company, North American Tungsten plc, purchased all the tungsten assets from Aur Resources, and was listed with the aim of reopening the Cantung mine, and developing the Hemerdon and Mactung prospects.

However, during a review of peripheral assets in 1999, it decided that with the depressed prices of tungsten, the Hemerdon prospect was not central to its future. With upkeep costs of in excess of C$150,000 per annum, almost a third of the company's annual costs, attempts were made with the mineral rights holders to reduce fees. The negotiations were unsuccessful and therefore during 2000, two of the three mineral rights were surrendered. To further reduce costs, it disposed the remaining assets of the Hemerdon prospect in 2003.

The concrete roads constructed around the Second World War mills up to the open-cast area at the top of the hill were used by the Plymouth Motor Club and Plymouth Kart Club for speed hill climbs until approximately 1972.

=== 2007–2018 ===
Sustained tungsten metal price rises resulted in a five-fold increase in the price of ammonium paratungstate (an intermediate product of tungsten), from around US$60 per STU in 2003, to in excess of US$240 per STU from 2006. This has resulted in increased tungsten mining exploration and development activities globally since 2005.

In June 2007, ASX-listed specialty metal exploration and development company, Wolf Minerals, suspended trading of shares pending the acquisition of mineral leases. On 5 December 2007, trading recommenced following the public announcement of acquiring the mineral leases for the Hemerdon Mine project. The mineral leases were made for a period of 40 years, with the Hemerdon Mineral Trust and the Olver Trust. An agreement with Imerys to purchase remaining mineral rights and freehold land was also made. Following agreements with local landowners to acquire surface rights, Wolf Minerals renamed the project the Drakelands Mine to "recognise the local community".

SRK Consulting were commissioned to produce a JORC-compliant resource using previous drilling data. This was released in March 2008. Subsequently, it has been updated twice by SRK Consulting to incorporate new drilling data and revised geological modelling. The resource of over 300,000 tonnes of tungsten metal makes Drakelands the fourth largest tungsten deposit in the world. In 2009, funding for a DFS (definitive feasibility study) was achieved with the support Resource Capital Funds and Traxys, completed in May 2011. Mining operations commenced in 2014, with first ore into the plant June 2015 and first concentrate production scheduled for September 2015. The project has planning permission dating back to 1986, which is valid until 2021. If production levels were achieved as anticipated, the mine would have been the largest tungsten concentrate producer in the world. A planning application was submitted to extend the pit slightly further to the southwest to further increase reserves.

Hemerdon Ball JORC Revised resource estimate completed by SRK Consulting in June 2010
Resource category	Ore tonnage (Mt)	Sn grade (%)	WO_{3} grade (%)	Contained Sn (tonnes)	Contained W (tonnes)
Measured	48.53	0.02	0.19	9700	72800
Indicated	22.39	0.02	0.18	4500	40300
Inferred	147.61	0.02	0.18	29500	206700
Total	218.53	0.02	0.18	43700	318800

Wolf Minerals ceased trading operations on 10 October 2018, as the mine never achieved extraction or financial targets. Despite such losses, the site is still thought to have potential as the site retains large ore deposits and valuable infrastructure.

=== 2019–2024 ===
Tungsten West plc, which floated on the London Stock Exchange's Alternative Investment Market on 21 October 2021, took over the mine. A review was conducted starting from the basics, of what is required to fix the problems that caused Wolf Minerals to fail. A better understanding of the mineralogy, with associated changes to the processing stream, and aggregate sales lead to the mine planning to re-open at scale in 2022, although as of February 2024 the mine had only began "interim operations" and is yet to receive regulatory permission from all authorities.

=== 2026 ===
On 25 August 2026 Chancellor John Healey announced an investment of up to £71m in the mine from the national wealth fund. The financing consists of a £36m equity investment alongside up to £35m of lending to help Tungsten West restart production.

== Processing ==
The Drakelands processing plant relies on a number of different processes to recover tin and tungsten and discard gangue minerals such as arsenopyrite and haematite. Broadly speaking, the process involves crushing and sizing, followed by gravity separation on fine material and dense media separation (DMS) on coarse material. The concentrates from these processes are then milled, followed by flotation and roasting, finishing with magnetic separation and further gravity separation to produce the final tungsten and tin concentrates respectively.

The processing plant was built by GR Engineering Services from Perth and consists of a primary/secondary crusher building near the mine and stockpile, feeding the main processing plant via conveyor, and a tertiary crusher building. Design recoveries of tin and tungsten are in the range of 58–66% depending on feed type (soft granite near-surface, hard granite towards depth), with grades of over 60% tungstate and tin as final products.

=== Crushing and sizing ===
Two Sandvik hybrid rolls crushers perform the primary and secondary crushing duties at gaps of approximately 60 and 40 mm respectively. These crushers were preferred over jaw crushers as they should cope better with the high clay content of the ore in the early years of operation. The secondary crusher product is conveyed into a Sepro scrubber where the material is washed to remove fines sticking to the coarser material. The majority of material from the scrubber reports to a double-deck screen, sizing at 9 and 4 mm. Oversize material from the scrubber and this screen (over 9 mm) is conveyed to two Sandvik cone crushers with a closed size setting of 12–15 mm, before returning onto the scrubber screen. Material between 9 and 4 mm in size reports to the DMS circuit. The undersize material from the scrubber screen (less than 4 mm) is pumped onto a second screen where it is sized at 0.5 mm. The oversize for this screen makes up further DMS feed, and the undersize from this screen (less than 0.5 mm) reports to a large holding tank that stores feed for the gravity circuit.

=== Gravity separation ===
Wolframite and cassiterite are heavy minerals, making them very suitable for recovery by gravity separation. The gravity separation process at the Drakelands processing plant starts two steps of desliming using Multotec deslime cyclones, designed to cut at 63 and 45 micron respectively. The underflow from these spirals goes to three banks of eleven 3-start MG6.3 Mineral Technologies spirals (99 spirals in total), producing a rougher concentrate that reports to the cleaner spirals, a middlings product that goes to a bank of 33 middlings spirals and tailings that go to the 25 m diameter thickener. The middlings spirals (also MG6.3) tailings go to the thickener, and the concentrate is sent to the cleaner spirals. The cleaner spirals (four MG6.3) tailings are recycled to the rougher spirals and the concentrate is sent to Holmans tables for further refining.

After dewatering using Multotec cyclones, two Holman's Wilfley shaking tables are used to produce a rougher table concentrate. This concentrate is sized at 90 μm using a Derrick screen and dewatered using cyclones followed by two further steps of cleaning/recleaning (also on Holman's Wilfley shaking tables) to produce the final coarse and fine gravity concentrate. The tailings and middling from the rougher table reports back to the rougher spiral feed, whilst cleaner table middlings/tailings are sent back to the rougher tables and re-cleaner table middlings and tailings are sent back to the cleaner tables.

=== Dense media separation ===
The −9 +0.5 mm fraction produced by the crushing/washing/sizing circuit is stored in a feed bin with approximately 4-5h capacity. A prep screen washes any remaining <0.5 mm material that inadvertently reported to the DMS feed into an effluent tank. The over-0.5 mm product reports into two mixing boxes where it is mixed with primary DMS dense medium, before being pumped up to the primary DMS cyclones. There are two identical DMS circuits consisting of three Multotec cyclones fed by VSD pump set at 180 kPa and a cut density close to 2.7 g/cm^{3}, so as to separate out the majority of silicates whilst not losing any particles containing heavy minerals. The floats and sinks from these cyclones report to drain/rinse screens where the respective products are separated from the medium. Primary DMS floats go to the tailings storage facility via conveyor and large storage tanks, whilst sinks are sent to the secondary DMS circuit for further refining.

The secondary DMS circuit further refines the primary DMS sinks, producing a final DMS concentrate (sinks). The cut point of this circuit is around 3.2 g/cm^{3}, allowing rejection of binary particles with excessive silicate content as well as any heavier gangue particles. The floats are sent to an Ersel ball mill operating in closed circuit with a double-deck sizing screen. The over-1.7 mm portion of the mill product returns to the mill for further grinding, the −1.7 +0.5 mm product makes up scavenger DMS feed, and the below-0.5 mm product is combined with DMS effluent cyclone underflow to make up additional feed to the fines storage tank. The scavenger DMS circuit is identical to the secondary DMS circuit but operates on a finer feed. Floats report to the mill for further grinding and sinks make up an additional stream of DMS concentrate.

The medium in the primary DMS circuit consists of a mixture of milled ferrosilicon and magnetite, with the exact mix regulated to maintain appropriate medium stability. The secondary and scavenger DMS correct mediums consist purely of atomised ferrosilicon. All correct mediums are kept at the correct density using a set of densifiers, supplemented by low intensity wet magnetic separators (LIMS) removing ferrosilicon from the dilute medium. The non-magnetic proportion of the LIMS feed reports to the same effluent tank that also contains the below-0.5 mm proportion of the feed removed by the prep screen. The DMS effluent is dewatered using a set of cyclones, with the underflow reporting to the fines storage tank feeding the gravity circuit.

=== Concentrate processing ===
The feed into the concentrate processing section is made up of fines concentrate (less than 0.5 mm) and DMS concentrate (−9 +0.5 mm), containing mainly of wolframite, cassiterite, iron oxides, and some silicates and arsenic minerals. The DMS concentrate is fed into a regrind ball mill which operates in closed circuit with a 450 micron Derrick sizing screen. The fines concentrate reports onto this Derrick screen directly to avoid over-grinding of the finer portion of this stream. The undersize of the regrind mill sizing screen is pumped via a dewatering cyclone into a conditioning tank. In this tank, several chemicals are added to enable sulphide flotation in three Outotec Denver flotation cells, targeting removal of arsenopyrite. The sulphide concentrate (floats) is pumped to the thickener for disposal, and the underflow (roaster feed) is dewatered using a filter belt. In the soft granite the arsenic occurs mainly as scorodite, which cannot be floated.

The roasting process involves drying using a Drytech pre-dryer that thoroughly dries the pre-concentrate before feeding into a reduction kiln. This kiln uses diesel as a reductant to generate carbon monoxide, which reacts with haematite and other iron oxides in the feed at approximately 700 °C, to create magnetite or maghemite whilst leaving other minerals largely unaffected. This process changes paramagnetic haematite into ferromagnetic maghemite/magnetite. Wolframite, like hematite, is paramagnetic and without this reduction step separation of haematite and wolframite would be impossible using magnetic separators.

The reduced ore from the kiln is cooled and fed onto a low intensity magnetic separator (LIMS) which is designed to remove the now highly magnetic iron oxides, which are sent to the tailings thickener. The non-magnetic product from the LIMS is sized at 150 μm on a dry Derrick screen before free-flowing to a multi-stage high gradient disc electromagnetic separator (VOG HIMS), with the goal of separating tungsten from non-magnetic minerals such as cassiterite and silicate. These HIMS produce six streams of varying quality tungsten concentrate grading up to over 60% tungstate.

Removal of wolframite and other paramagnetic minerals leaves a coarse and a fine non-magnetic stream rich in tin and silicates. Refining of this stream to remove silicates (mainly quartz and tourmaline) is done using Holmans Wilfley shaking tables. The tailings from this process are combined with the LIMS tailings before pumping to the tailings thickener. The concentrate is filtered on a belt filter before drying in a smaller dryer.

== See also ==
- Mining in Cornwall and Devon
- Dartmoor tin-mining
