= Directional Recoil Identification from Tracks =

Device for detecting dark matter particles

Coordinates: 54.5534°N 0.8245°W

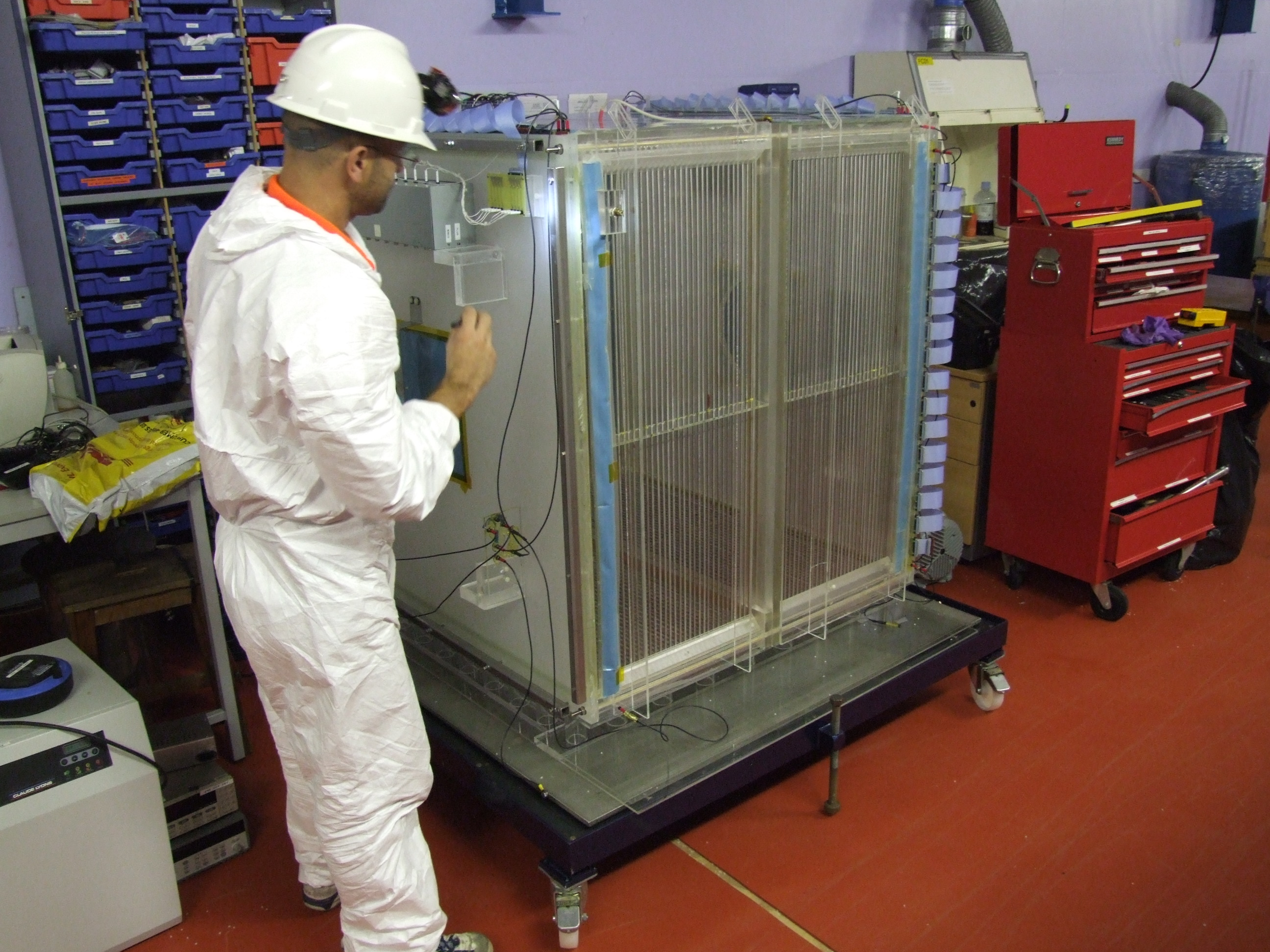
The DRIFT-IId Detector removed from the vacuum vessel for maintenance.

The Directional Recoil Identification from Tracks (DRIFT) detector is a low pressure negative ion time projection chamber (NITPC) designed to detect weakly interacting massive particles (WIMPs) - a prime dark matter candidate.

There are currently two DRIFT detectors in operation. DRIFT-IId, which is located 1100m underground in the Boulby Underground Laboratory at the Boulby Mine in North Yorkshire, England, and DRIFT-IIe, which is located on the surface at Occidental College in Los Angeles.

The DRIFT collaboration ultimately aims to develop and operate an underground array of DRIFT detectors for observing and reconstructing WIMP-induced nuclear recoil tracks with enough precision to provide a signature of the dark matter halo.

== WIMP detection ==
There are numerous experiments worldwide attempting to detect the energy deposition that is expected to occur when a WIMP directly collides with an atom of ordinary matter. Ultra sensitive experiments are required to detect the low energy and extremely rare interaction that is predicted to occur between a WIMP and the nucleus of an atom in a target material. The DRIFT detectors vary from the majority of WIMP detectors in their use of a low pressure gas as a target material. The low pressure gas means that an interaction within the detector causes an ionisation track of measurable length compared to the point like interactions seen in detectors with solid or liquid target materials. Such ionisation tracks can be reconstructed in three dimensions to determine not only the type of particle that caused it, but from which direction the particle came. This directional sensitivity has the potential to prove the existence of WIMPs by their distinct directional signature.

== Detection technology ==
Negative ion track formation in the DRIFT detector.

The DRIFT detector's target material is a 1 m^{3} cubical drift chamber filled with a low pressure mixture of carbon disulfide (CS_{2}) and carbon tetrafluoride (CF_{4}) gases (30 and 10 torrs (4.0 and 1.3 kPa), respectively). It is predicted that WIMPs will occasionally collide with the nucleus of a sulfur or carbon atom in the carbon disulfide gas causing the nucleus to recoil. An energetic recoiling nucleus will ionise gas particles creating a path of free electrons. These free electrons readily attach to the electronegative CS_{2} molecules creating a track of CS −
2 ions. The gas volume is divided in half by a cathode at −34 kV, which produces a static electric field that causes these negative ions to drift, whilst maintaining the track structure, to the MWPC planes at two ends of the detector. Addition of 1 torr (130 Pa) of oxygen to the gas mixture has been the key to full fiducialisation of sensitive volume of the DRIFT detector.

== Results ==
DRIFT-IId published Spin-dependent limits in 2012.
