= Sirius Minerals =

Sirius Minerals plc
- Type: Public
- Traded as: LSE: SXX
- Industry: Fertilizers; Minerals
- Founded: 2003
- Key people: Russell Scrimshaw (chairman); Chris Fraser (CEO)
- Products: Potash; Polyhalite; POLY4
- Revenue: £nil (2018)
- Operating income: £(24.2) million (2018)
- Net income: £(12.5) million (2018)
- Website: siriusminerals.com

Proposed mine, mineral transport system and Teesside plant

Project area of interest

Sirius Minerals plc was a fertilizer development company based in the United Kingdom. It was listed on the London Stock Exchange until it was acquired by Anglo American in March 2020.

== History ==
Founded in 2003, the company initially focused on exploring the potential for potash mining in North Dakota. However, after abandoning attempts at overseas exploration in February 2012 and following approval from the North York Moors National Park Authority in June 2015, the then AIM-listed company stated that it would seek financing in order to begin construction at the Woodsmith Mine in North Yorkshire. It was admitted to the main market in April 2017.

In September 2019, the Woodsmith Mine project was in doubt when the company shelved a £400 million junk bond sale, citing a lack of government support and Brexit uncertainty. In November 2019, the company announced that it was in talks with potential investors to raise $600 million needed to fund the first phase of the development.

In January 2020, Anglo American confirmed it was considering making a bid to buy Sirius, making a 5.5p per share offer to buy the project for £400m. In salvaging the financially troubled project, Anglo American envisages spending around £230m to keep construction going through to at least 2022. Sirius advised shareholders that if the offer was rejected then the company could face administration within weeks. Subject to approval by at least 75% of Sirius shareholders, the deal was expected to become effective by 31 March 2020. The sale was approved by shareholders on 4 March 2020.

== Operations ==
The Company’s stated focus was the development of its North Yorkshire polyhalite project which aimed to exploit the world’s largest deposit of polyhalite, a type of potash. The company planned to create a mine three miles south of Whitby and an underground conveyor system to transport the mineral from the mine site to a materials handling facility at Teesside, 36 km (22 mi) away. The area of interest is located on the Yorkshire coast, mostly within the North York Moors National Park. The mineral seam lies 1,500 metres (4,900 ft) below the surface, covering an area of approximately 796 km^{2} (307 mi^{2}), around 271 km^{2} (105 mi^{2}) onshore and 535 km^{2} (207 mi^{2}) offshore.
