= Woodsmith Mine =

Polyhalite mine in North Yorkshire, England

Coordinates: 54.431882°N 0.625037°W

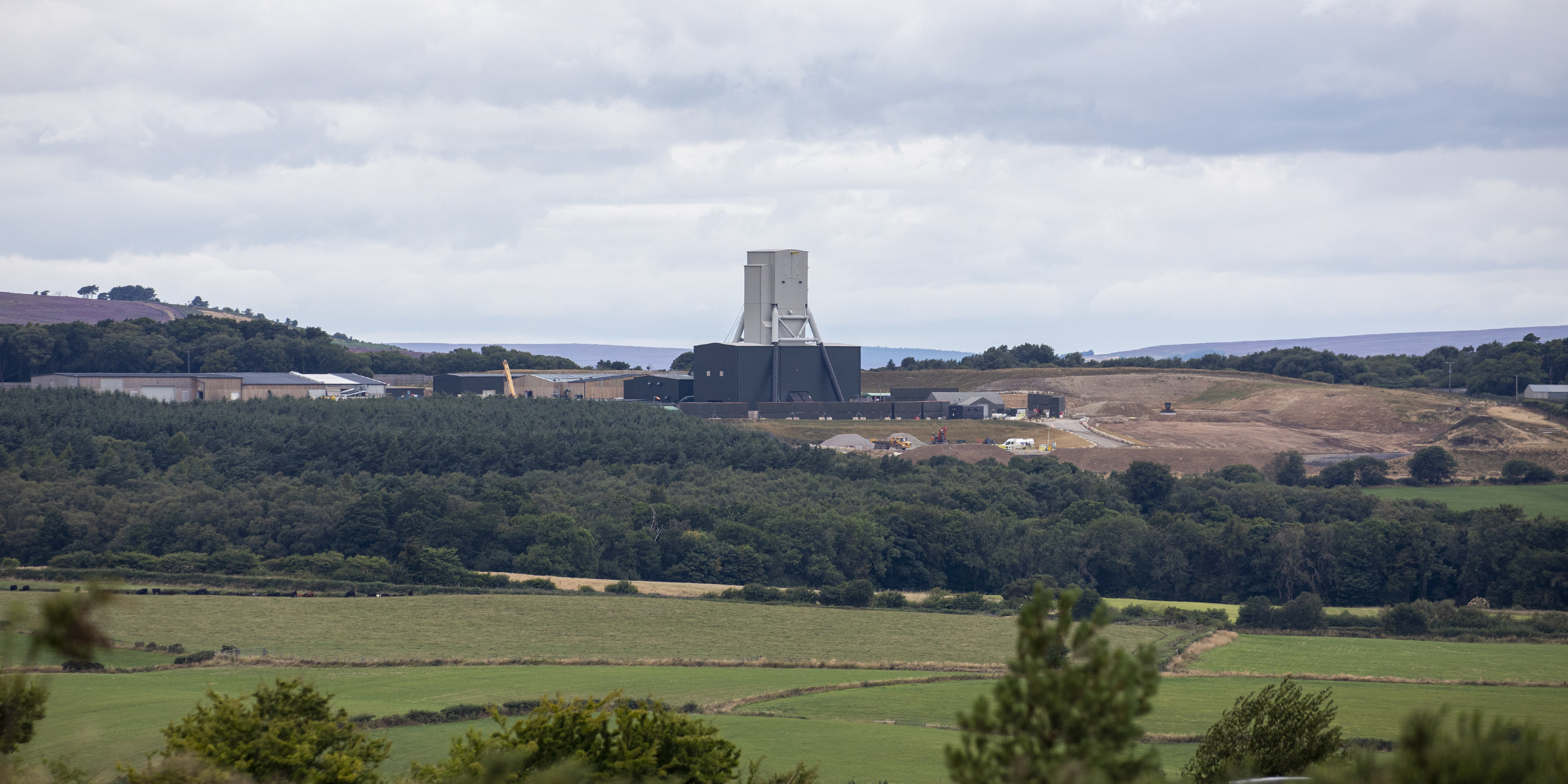
- Woodsmith Mine complex from Fylingdales Moor

- Location within North Yorkshire
- Location: Sneatonthorpe, North Yorkshire, England
- Products: Potash; Polyhalite
- Production: 20 million tonnes per annum
- Type: Underground
- Greatest depth: 1,500 m (4,900 ft)
- Opened: 2017
- Company: Anglo American
- Website: Official website
- Acquired: 2020

Woodsmith Mine is a deep planned potash and polyhalite mine located near the hamlet of Sneatonthorpe, Whitby in North Yorkshire, England. The venture was started by York Potash Ltd, which became a subsidiary of Sirius Minerals plc whose primary focus was the development of the polyhalite project. The project will mine the world's largest known deposit of polyhalite – a naturally occurring mineral. Because the project would require mining to be undertaken in the North York Moors National Park, many objections were raised to the mine and the proposed underground conveyor that would be installed to transport the raw material offsite to a plant on Teesside 37 km (23 mi) away.

The mine is expected to have a life of 100 years and has been labelled the biggest mining project in Britain for decades; its twin shafts will be the deepest commercial mineshafts in Britain. The project is expected to generate over £100 billion for the UK economy over a period of 50 years.

Once it is functioning it will be the deepest mine in Europe and have the longest tunnel in Great Britain.

== History ==
=== Potash in North Yorkshire ===
Deposits of potash in North Yorkshire have been well known about since the 1930s when boreholes drilled for gas and oil also discovered the mineral. At least three submissions to mine the mineral were submitted in 1971 and a further one in 1978. Such was the belief of the venture in the Whitby area, that even after the railway line between Whitby and Scarborough had closed, a small section between Prospect Hill at Whitby and Hawsker was left in-situ for a commercial potash venture near to the village of Stainsacre.

=== Sirius Minerals ===
The initial proposal was forwarded from York Potash to the North York Moors National Park Authority in 2011. This enabled the Authority to allow test drilling at various sites along the coast between Whitby and Scarborough. The company decided to develop a site next to Doves Nest farm near to the hamlet of Sneatonthorpe. The geological survey pointed to a resource that is the world's largest and highest grade polyhalite deposit.

Sirius withdrew its initial planning application in 2013 to re-examine key elements, particularly the project's environmental impact. Plans were resubmitted in 2014 with notable changes including an underground system of conveyor belts to transport the dry mineral, instead of a slurry pipeline, and other mitigation efforts. Originally, the transport methods for delivering the product from the mine were conveyor, pipeline and by rail on the Esk Valley line.

The decision from members of the North York Moors National Park Authority to resolve to grant planning permission for the mine and mineral transport system, was made at a public meeting on 30 June 2015. When complete, the Project would be among the largest mining projects ever built in the United Kingdom.

Sirius intended to have the mine and associated tunnel operational by 2021, with preferred bidder status on construction being announced in June 2016.

Schematic of Woodsmith Mine operations

The project requires the company to construct two 1,500 m (4,900 ft) shafts to reach the 70 m (230 ft) mineral seam which includes a mineable area of around 25,200 ha (62,000 acres). The twin shafts have been labelled as the deepest commercial mineshafts in Britain, and the mine will also be the deepest in Europe. (Note: Pyhäsalmi Mine in Finland is said to be the deepest at 1,444 m (4,738 ft); Woodsmith will exceed that depth by 556 m (1,824 ft).)

To minimise the amount of visible infrastructure within the North York Moors National Park, a protected area, the polyhalite ore will be transported 37 km (23 mi) at an average depth of 250 m (820 ft) in a tunnel to the company's processing plant at Teesside. The tunnel will consist of two conveyors: the first will be 24 km (15 mi) long and the second will be 13 km (8.1 mi). There will be an interchange point between the two conveyors at Lockwood Beck, near Guisborough.

After granulation and drying, the finished product— marketed as POLY4—will be exported from the nearby harbour facilities. The mine will produce 20 million tonnes a year of polyhalite, potash and POLY4 and is expected to be in production for 100 years. Woodsmith Mine has been projected as contributing over £100 billion for the UK economy over a period of 50 years.

In August 2017, the 1,500 m (4,900 ft) deep tunnels were being constructed on the site. The Times said that the project was the "biggest mining project Britain has seen in decades".

Orders for the mineral have already been agreed with third-party distributors in America and South-East Asia to receive 1,500,000 t (1,700,000 tons) and 750,000 t (830,000 tons) respectively each year. In September 2018, Sirius Minerals revealed that had signed a seven-year deal with a Brazilian fertiliser distributor to export 2,500,000 t (2,800,000 tons) per year to South America. All mineral supplies will be delivered from a new harbour area on Teesside. The company acquired a site adjacent to the defunct Redcar Steelworks site in December 2017, which will serve as the northern portal of the conveyor. The site will be known as Bran Sands with initial building taking place in 2019. However, the site was assessed as not have satisfactory loading facilities for shipping, so in May 2018, Sirius signed an agreement with the South Tees Site Company, to option the site which lies 4 km (2.5 mi) from the Bran Sands site, but offers better access to the River Tees.

In November 2018, Sirius agreed a multi-million pound contract to use the site next to the Redcar Bulk Terminal instead. Engineers will install a storage area and ship loading facilities to allow the product to be exported from the original site.

=== Anglo American ===
In September 2019 the project was in doubt when Sirius shelved a £400 million junk bond sale, citing a lack of government support and Brexit uncertainty. In November 2019 the company announced that it was in talks with potential investors to raise $600 million needed to fund the first phase of the development.

In January 2020 Anglo American plc confirmed it was considering making a bid to buy Sirius Minerals, and then made a 5.5p per share offer to buy the project for £400 million. In salvaging the financially troubled project, Anglo American envisaged spending around £230 million to keep construction going through to at least 2022. Sirius advised shareholders that if the offer was rejected the company could face entering administration within weeks. Subject to approval by at least 75% of Sirius shareholders, the deal was expected to become effective by 31 March 2020. The sale was approved by shareholders on 4 March 2020.

In December 2020, Anglo American stated their intent to spend a further $200 million on top of the already allocated $300 million to enable ground and tunneling works to "gather pace [in 2021]". They also announced further jobs that they will recruit for so that by spring 2020, the total number of personnel on site would be 1,400.

=== Objections ===
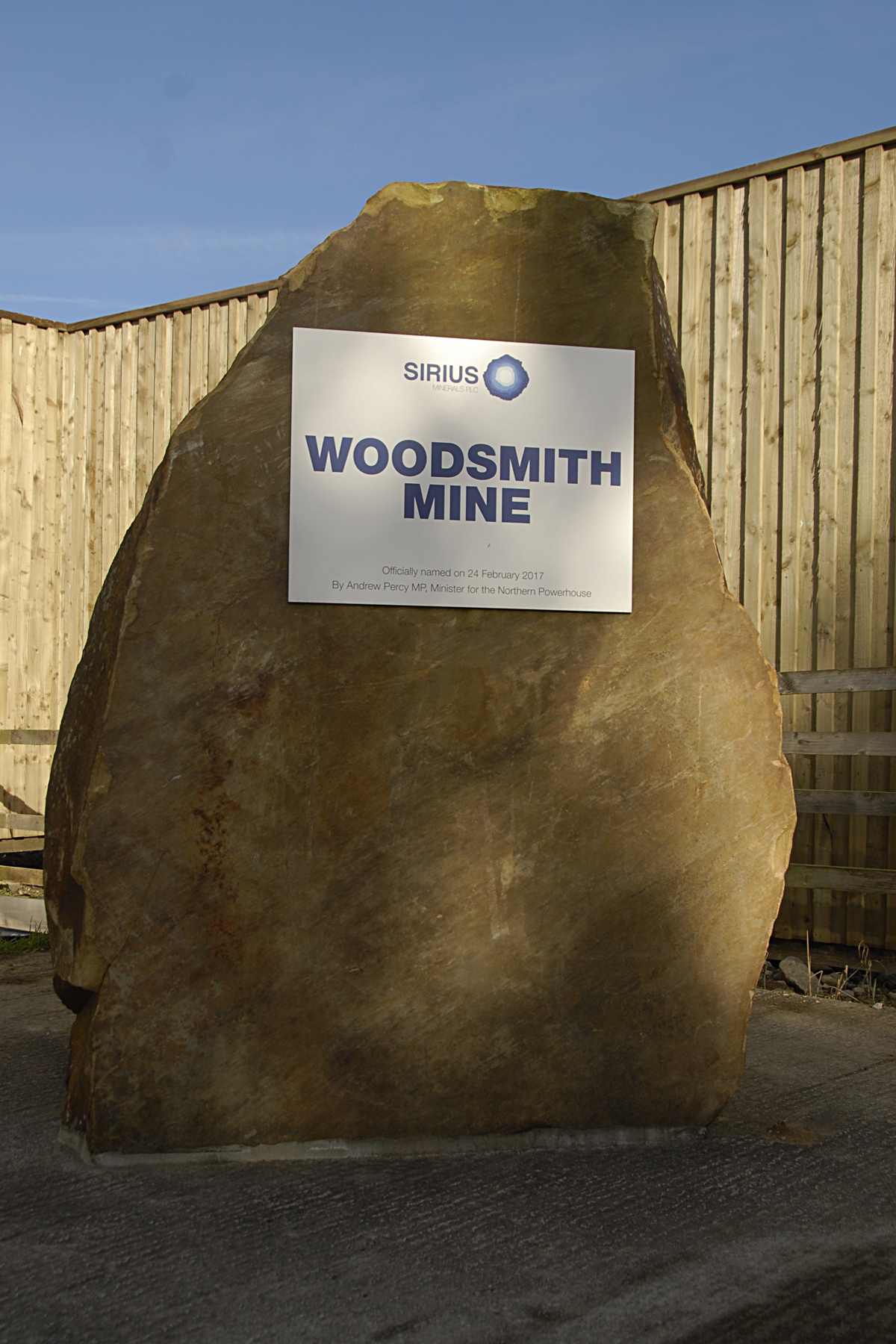
Woodsmith Mine cairn with official opening date

Many groups and campaigners objected to the project. An open letter signed by 29 different groups, including the Caravan Club, the RSPB and the Campaign for National Parks, was sent to the national park authority, whose own internal report stated that the economic benefits of the mine did not outweigh the environmental damage it would cause. Initially, the Ministry of Defence lodged an objection to the mine as its use of dynamite blasting had the potential to cause damage to the sensitive equipment at RAF Fylingdales which is only 6.4 km (4 mi) south west of the mine head. This objection was withdrawn when the company agreed to the MoD's conditions and monitoring of the mine's workings.

However, some local people supported the venture. The farmer who works the land that will be adjacent to the minesite wrote to the NPA in support of the project stating

Please approve the application and stop the deteriorating living standards of the Whitby people. Stop the young moving out and plan to keep families together.

Another local man stated that there was nothing in the area other than pot washing or working in the local fish and chip restaurant.

=== Naming and ground works ===
In February 2017, the project was given the name Woodsmith Mine in an unveiling by Andrew Percy MP, the Northern Powerhouse Minister. The name of the mine is a portmanteau of the surnames of Peter Woods and Dr Frederick Smith, who were two of the original geologists on the project. The mine head is situated on Doves Nest farm, a former beef farming site.

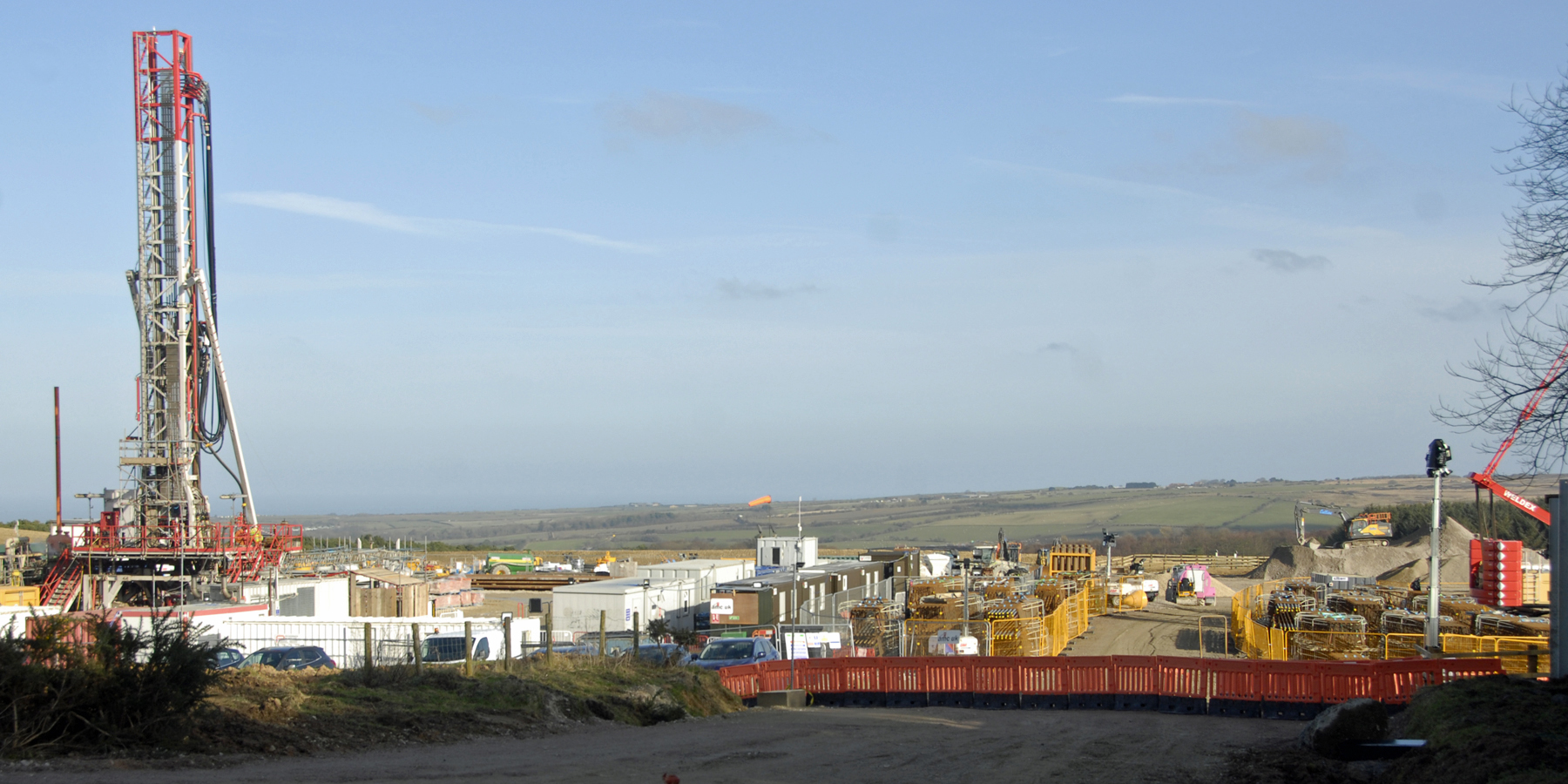
Digging works at Woodsmith Mine

Ground works on the mine and initial building were due to start in April 2017 whilst preparatory work on the access roads (including building new filter lanes on the A171 road) was undertaken in February and March 2017. In May 2017, Sirius minerals confirmed that construction work had officially started at the site with production of minerals starting in late 2021. By 2023, the construction works were not complete and the owners issued a revised date of 2027 for the beginning of mineral extraction, together with an increased investment in the construction budget aiming to improve the long-term yield of the seam. In 2024 the projected completion date was extended to 2030.

== Mineral transport tunnel ==
In June 2018, work was started on the 37 km (23 mi) tunnel that would convey the polyhalite from the mine site to Teesside. The tunnel was originally due to be 4.3 m (14 ft) in diameter, but after the initial groundworks and with an enhanced understanding of the geological strata, this was changed to 4.9 m (16 ft) in diameter with the increased lining thickness too. This meant the company needed £3.6 billion of stage 2 funding as opposed to the estimated £3 billion it had projected for the tunnelling and mineshaft phase. Sirius issued a warning about the financial situation so that "everybody is clear of the significance of the stage-two funding for us to continue."

The first tunnel boring machine (TBM) arrived at Teesport in February 2019. The TBMs will number three with one working from Teesside southwards towards Whitby, whilst the other two will work from the mine site northwards towards Teesside. Each TBM weighs 1,800 t (2,000 tons) and will progress between 17 m (56 ft) and 20 m (66 ft) per day. The TBMs at the mine site will start off underground at a depth of around 360 m (1,180 ft) with the whole tunnel being at an average depth of 250 m (820 ft).

Tunnelling started from Teesside on 12 April 2019 and when completed, the tunnel will be the longest wholly within Great Britain. (Note: The Channel Tunnel is 50.45 km (31.35 mi) long, but only one end of the tunnel is in Britain.) By December 2025 30 km (19 mi) - 81% of the total length - had been dug.
