= Polyhalite =

Sedimentary mineral

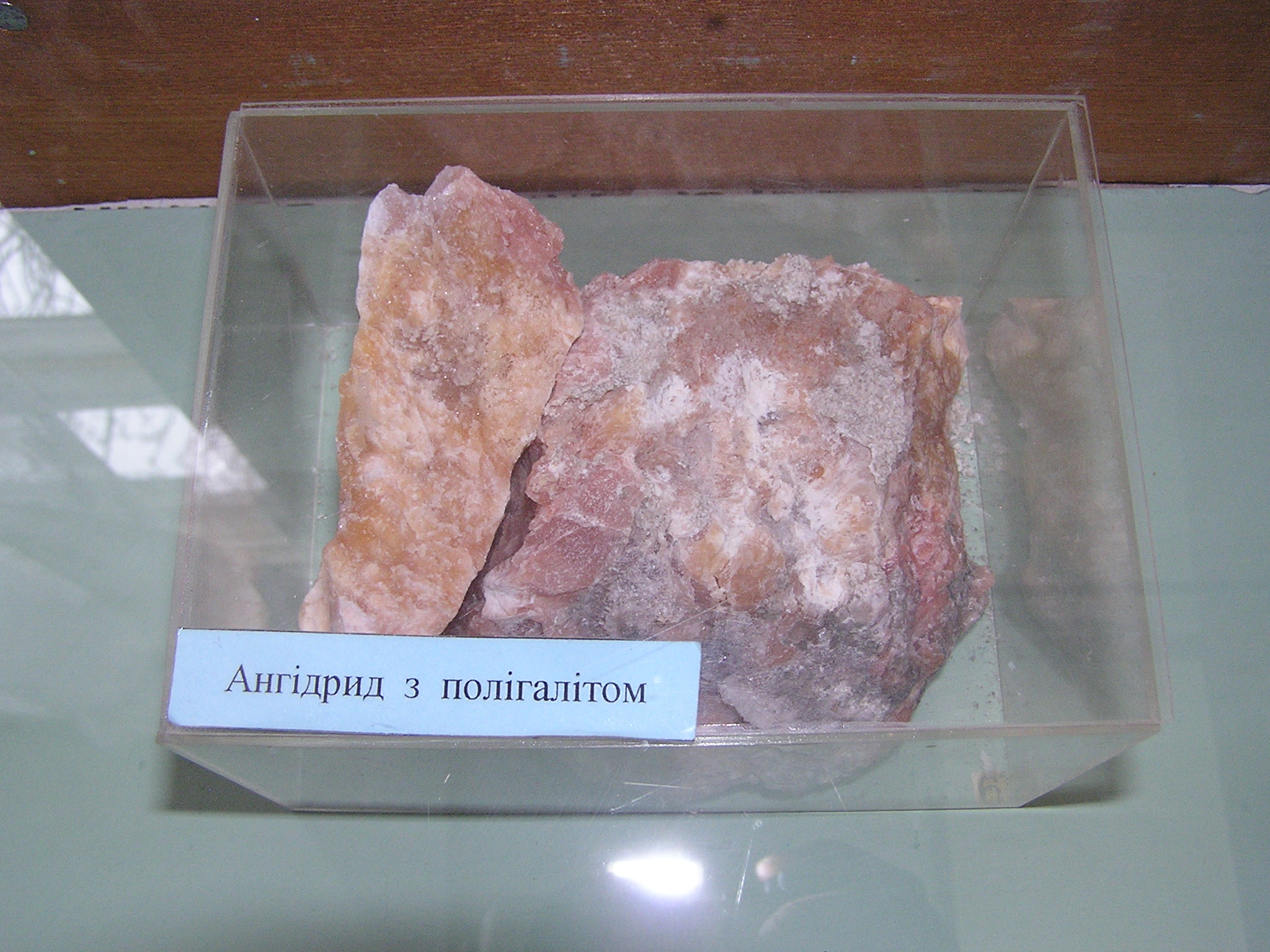
- Museum specimen of polyhalite and anhydrite

General
- Category: Sulfate mineral
- Formula: K_{2}Ca_{2}Mg(SO_{4})_{4}·2H_{2}O
- IMA symbol: Plhl
- Strunz classification: 7.CC.65
- Crystal system: Triclinic
- Crystal class: Pinacoidal (1̅) (same H-M symbol)
- Space group: F1̅
- Unit cell: a = 6.95 Å, b = 8.88 Å, c = 6.95 Å; α = 104.06°, β = 113.94°, γ = 101.15°; Z = 4

Identification
- Color: Colorless, white, gray; often salmon-pink to brick-red from included iron oxide
- Crystal habit: Typically fibrous, foliated, massive; rarely as tabular crystals; pseudo-orthorhombic
- Twinning: Characteristically polysynthetic on {010}, {100}
- Cleavage: Perfect on {101̅}; parting on {010}
- Fracture: Conchoidal
- Tenacity: Brittle
- Mohs scale hardness: 3.5
- Luster: Vitreous to resinous
- Streak: White
- Diaphaneity: Transparent
- Specific gravity: 2.78
- Optical properties: Biaxial (−)
- Refractive index: n_{α} = 1.546 – 1.548 n_{β} = 1.558 – 1.562 n_{γ} = 1.567
- Birefringence: δ = 0.021
- 2V angle: Measured: 60° to 62°
- Solubility: Soluble in water, with precipitation of gypsum and perhaps syngenite

Polyhalite is an evaporite mineral, a hydrated sulfate of potassium, calcium and magnesium with formula: K_{2}Ca_{2}Mg(SO_{4})_{4}·2H_{2}O. Polyhalite crystallizes in the triclinic system, although crystals are very rare. The normal habit is massive to fibrous. It is typically colorless, white to gray, although it may be brick red due to iron oxide inclusions. It has a Mohs hardness of 3.5 and a specific gravity of 2.8. It is used as a valuable fertilizer.

Polyhalite was first described in 1818 for specimens from its type locality in Salzburg, Austria. It occurs in sedimentary marine evaporites and is a major potassium ore mineral in the Carlsbad deposits of New Mexico. It is also present as a 2–3% contaminant of Himalayan salt. The only deposit currently being mined lies under North Yorkshire, UK, extending under the adjacent North Sea.

== Name ==
The name comes from the German Polyhalit, which comes from the Ancient Greek words πολύς (polys) and ἅλς (hals), which mean "many" and "salt", and the German ending -it (which comes from the Latin ending -ites, which originally also came from Greek), which is used like the English ending -ite to form the names of certain chemical compounds.

Despite the similarity in names between polyhalite and halite (the naturally occurring form of table salt), their only connection is that both are evaporite minerals. The use of the Greek words for many and salt in polyhalite is due to polyhalite consisting of several metals that can form salts in the more general sense of the word salt used in chemistry.

== Extraction ==
The only polyhalite mined in the world comes from a layer of rock over 1,000 m (3,300 ft) below North Yorkshire and extending off the North Sea coast in the UK, deposited 260 million years ago.

In 2010, the first mining operations of this polyhalite mineral layer commenced at Boulby Mine, and the mine is in 2023 the only producer of polyhalite, marketed by ICL Group Ltd. as Polysulphate. In 2016, Sirius Minerals announced plans for the Woodsmith Mine in the area. In March 2020, the Woodsmith project was taken over by Anglo American plc and construction of two 1,500 m (4,900 ft) shafts to reach the 70 m (230 ft) mineral seam was underway in 2015. These will reach a mineable area of around 25,200 ha (62,000 acres) and Woodsmith Mine will be the deepest in Europe. The Woodsmith project was originally slated to begin production in 2027; development has since been slowed, and Anglo American now expects to ramp up construction from 2027, with a new first production date yet to be announced.

== Composition and use ==
Polyhalite is used as a fertilizer since it contains four important nutrients and is low in chloride:

- 48% SO_{3} as sulfate
- 14% K_{2}O as from sulfate of potash
- 6% MgO as from magnesium sulfate
- 17% CaO as from calcium sulfate

Polyhalite has a variety of other uses, including:

Soil amendment: Polyhalite can help to improve the drainage and fertility of soil. It can also help to reduce the acidity of soil.

Water treatment additive: Polyhalite can help to remove impurities from water, such as sulfates and chlorides. It can also help to soften water and make it less corrosive.

Animal feed additive: Polyhalite can be added to animal feed to improve the nutritional value of the feed.

Industrial applications: Polyhale can be used in a variety of industrial applications, such as making glass, soap, and paper.

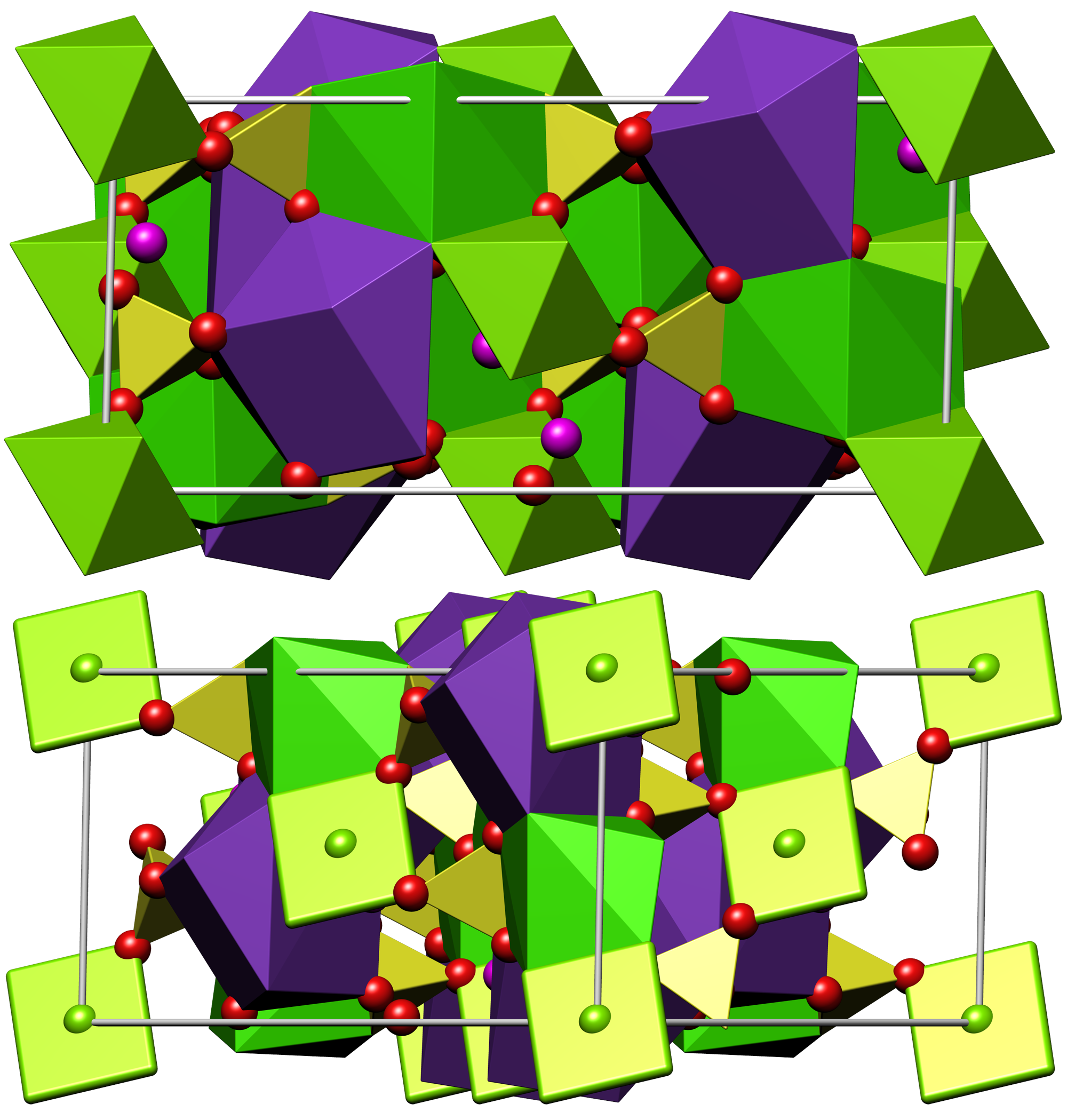
Crystal structure of polyhalite
