= Euchlorine =

Sulfate mineral

Euchlorine, Euclorina, Euchlorin, Euchlorite
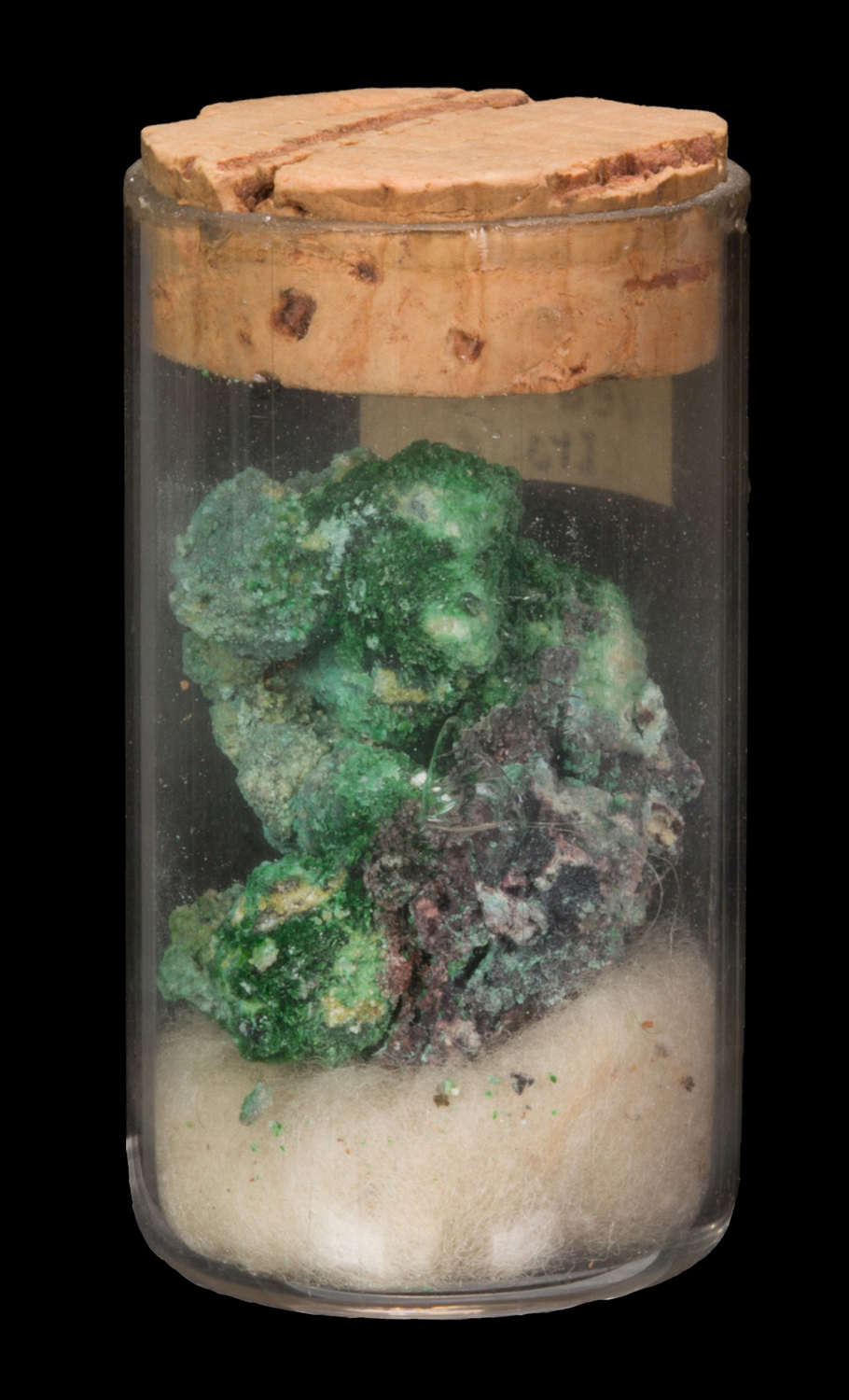

General
- Category: Sulfate mineral
- Formula: KNaCu_{3}(SO_{4})_{3}O
- IMA symbol: Ecr
- Strunz classification: 7.BC.30
- Dana classification: 30.3.1.1
- Crystal system: Monoclinic
- Space group: C2/c
- Unit cell: a = 18.41(5) Å, b = 9.43(3) Å, c = 14.21(5) Å, β = 113.7(3)°; Z = 8

Identification
- Color: Emerald-green, dark green
- Crystal habit: Single crystals, tabular, incrustation
- Streak: Pistachio green
- Density: 3.28 (measured), 3.28 (calculated)
- Optical properties: Biaxial (+), moderate relief, emerald green color (transmitted light)
- Refractive index: n_{α} = 1.580, n_{β} = 1.605, n_{γ} = 1.644
- Birefringence: δ = 0.064
- Pleochroism: X: Pale grass-green, Y: Grass-green, Z: Bright yellow-green
- 2V angle: Moderately large (measured)
- Dispersion: r < v
- Solubility: Partially soluble in water

Euchlorine (KNaCu_{3}(SO_{4})_{3}O) is a rare emerald-green sulfate mineral found naturally occurring as a sublimate in fumaroles around volcanic eruptions. It was first discovered in fumaroles of the 1868 eruption at Mount Vesuvius in Campania, Italy by Arcangelo Scacchi. The name 'euchlorine' comes from the Greek word εΰχλωρος meaning "pale green" in reference to the mineral's color, other reported spellings include euclorina, euchlorin, and euchlorite.

The ideal formula of euchlorine is KNaCu_{3}(SO_{4})_{3}O though calcium (Ca) and magnesium (Mg) occasionally substitute into the crystal lattice. Euchlorine is structurally related to puninite (Na_{2}Cu_{3}(SO_{4})_{3}O) and fedotovite (K_{2}Cu_{3}(SO_{4})_{3}O), all of which are included in the euchlorine group of minerals.

One of the distinguishing physical properties helpful for identifying euchlorine in hand sample is its streak, which is a pistachio-green color. If trying to find euchlorine in the field, wear protective clothing as the volcanic fumaroles around which it occurs can be very hot (approximately 300 to 650 °C, 580 to 1200 °F) and can cause severe steam burns if not adequately protected.

== Geologic occurrence ==
Mount Vesuvius, Naples, Italy is the type locality of euchlorine. It occurred as a sublimate in fumaroles (hot vents of steam and other volcanic gases) that formed during the 1868 volcanic eruption, it has also been found in fumaroles during eruptions at the same location in 1892 and 1893. Mineral associations at this site include dolerophanite, eriochalcite, chalcocyanite, melanothallite, anglesite, atacamite, cryptochalcite, palmierite, barite, and natrochalcite.

Euchlorine has also been found at Izalco Volcano in El Salvador. In 1987 euchlorine was one of the minerals found in association with Mcbirneyite when it was first discovered in fumaroles at the summit of Izalco Volcano. Other mineral associations at this location include stoiberite, fingerite, ziesite, and thenardite.

In Russia, euchlorine has been found in association with multiple new minerals discovered in the 2000s and 2010s.

At fumarole deposits in the North Breach from the Tolbachik Volcano eruption of the Great Fissure on the Kamchatka Peninsula euchlorine (as euchlorite) was found associated with newly discovered mineral avdoninite and reported around 2005–2007. In 2012 the discovery of a new fumarolic mineral cupromolybdite found in the New Tolbachik Scoria Cones in association with euchlorine at Tolbachik Volcano was published. Not long after, in early 2013, yaroshevskite was reported newly discovered from scoria cones of the Great Fissure Eruption at Tolbachik Volcano in association with euchlorine. Two new minerals were reported discovered in 2014 from two different fumaroles at Tolbachik Volcano in association with euchlorine. The first mineral was wulffite and the second was parawulffite, both from the area of the Northern Breakthrough during the Great Fissure Eruption. Work conducted on fumarole deposits from the same eruption found euchlorine being associated with a newly discovered mineral called itelmenite and was reported in 2015 and published in mid to late 2018.

In addition to the minerals discovered, euchlorine was found associated with minerals including:

- Avdoninite – Paratacamite, atacamite, belloite, and langbeinite (Yadovitaya Fumarole, Second Cinder Cone, North Breach, Great Fissure Tolbachik Eruption, Tolbachik Volcano, Kamchatka, Russia)
- Cupromolybdite – Piypite, fedotovite, vergasovaite, hematite, magnetite, aphthitalite, langbeinite, palmierite, As-bearing orthoclase, lammerite, klyuchevskite, alumoklyuchevskite, lyonsite, pseudolyonsite, averievite, rutile, and native gold (New Tolbachik Scoria Cones, Tolbachik Volcano, Kamkatchka, Russia)
- Yaroshevskite – Fedotovite, hematite, tenorite, lyonsite, melanothallite, atlasovite, kamchatkite, secondary avdoninite, belloite, chalcanthite (Yadovitaya fumarole, Second Scoria Cone, Northern Breakthrough, Great Tolbachik Fissure Eruption, Tolbachik Volcano, Kamkatchka, Russia)
- Wulffite – Aphthitalite, tenorite, hematite, lammerite, johillerite, fluoborite (Arsenatnaya Fumarole, Second Scoria Cone, Northern Breakthrough, Great Tolbachik Fissure Eruption, Tolbachik Volcano, Kamkatchka, Russia)
- Parawulffite – Fedotovite, hematite, langbeinite, steklite (Yadovitaya Fumarole, Second Scoria Cone, Northern Breakthrough, Great Tolbachik Fissure Eruption, Tolbachik Volcano, Kamkatchka, Russia)
- Itelmenite – Anhydrite, saranchinaite, hermannjahnite, thenardite (as thénardite), aphthitalite, and hematite (Naboko Scoria Cone, Tolbachik Volcano Fissure Eruption, Tolbachik Volcano, Kamkatchka, Russia)

Marcel Mine in Radlin, Poland has also discovered what may be euchlorine in the 2010s.

== See also ==
- List of minerals recognized by the International Mineralogical Association (E)
- List of minerals

== Bibliography ==
- Palache, P.; Berman H.; Frondel, C. (1960). "Dana's System of Mineralogy, Volume II: Halides, Nitrates, Borates, Carbonates, Sulfates, Phosphates, Arsenates, Tungstates, Molybdates, Etc. (Seventh Edition)" John Wiley and Sons, Inc., New York, pp. 571.
