= Aleutite =

Mineral

General
- Category: vanadate and arsenate
- Formula: [Cu_{5}O_{2}](AsO_{4})(VO_{4}) · (Cu_{0.5}□_{0.5})Cl
- IMA symbol: Aeu
- Strunz classification: 4/K.01-10
- Crystal system: Monoclinic
- Crystal class: 2/m - Prismatic
- Space group: C2/m
- Unit cell: a = 18.090(2) Å, b = 6.2248(6) Å; c = 8.2465(9) Å; β= 90.597(2)°; Z = 4

Identification
- Formula mass: 287.26
- Color: Dark red
- Cleavage: none observed
- Fracture: Irregular/Uneven
- Tenacity: Brittle
- Luster: Adamantine
- Streak: Reddish black
- Diaphaneity: Transparent
- Density: 4.887 g/cm^{3}

Aleutite is both a vanadate and arsenate mineral but it can also be considered as a natural salt-inclusion phase. It was first discovered at Second scoria cone of the Great Fissure Tolbachik eruption in the summer of 2015 in Kamchatka, Russia. Aleutite is a fumarolic mineral found with many other newly discovered minerals at this location. It gained the name from the Aleuts, the ethnic group who are the original inhabitants living on the Commander Islands, Aleutsky District, Kamchatka Krai. This mineral is very brittle and has a dark red color. Aleutite is a new structure type, the structure was refined as a 2-component twin, the twin ratio equals (0.955:0.045).

== Occurrence ==
Aleutite occurs as a product of fumarolic activity. It was found in the summer of 2015 in Yadovitaya fumarole at the Second Scoria Cone of the Northern Breakthrough of the Great Fissure Tolbachik Eruption in Kamchatka, Russia. The Second Scoria Cone is located approximately 18 km SSW of the active shield volcano Ploskiy Tolbachik. The temperature of gases at the sampling location was about 300 °C. Aleutite could be deposited directly from the gas phase as a volcanic sublimate. All the recovered samples were immediately packed and isolated to avoid any contact with atmosphere. Aleutite is very rare and closely associates with anhydrite. Other associated minerals are euchlorine, kamchatkite, langbeinite, lyonsite, pseudolyonsite, tenorite, hematite.

== Physical properties ==
Aleutite occurs as individual crystals in the masses of polycrystalline anhydrite. Aleutite is dark red, with reddish black streak, and has an adamantine luster. It is brittle with no visible cleavage observed. Parting was not observed, and its fracture is uneven. The density could not be measured due to lack of sufficient material. The calculated specific gravity is 4.887 g/cm^{3}.

== Optical properties ==
The measured optical properties of Aleutite were found through reflected light. The mineral had high values of refractive indices which is typical of arsenates and vanadates. Reflectance measurements were made using a SiC standard in air which ranged from 400–700 nm. Aleutite is grey with yellowish tint in reflected light, it is non-pleochroic with abundant brown-red internal reflections and a weak bireflectance.

== Chemical properties ==
Aleutite is both a vanadate and arsenate that may can compared to averievite which has had a formula of Cu_{6}(VO_{4})_{2}O_{2}Cl_{2}. It may also be comparable with piypite with a formula of K_{2}Cu_{2}O(SO_{4})_{2}. The empirical formula of Aleutite cab be calculated on the basis of (As+V+Mo+Fe3+) = 2 apfu is Cu_{5.40}Zn_{0.05}Ca_{0.01}As_{1.09}V_{0.84}Mo_{0.04}Fe_{0.03}K_{0.05}Pb_{0.02}Rb_{0.01}Cs_{0.01}O_{9.97}Cl_{1.07} or (Cu_{4.94}Zn_{0.05}Ca_{0.01})_{Σ5.00}O_{2.11}[(As_{2.11}V_{0.42}Mo_{0.02}Fe_{0.02})_{Σ1.00}O_{Σ3.93}]_{2} ∙ (Cu_{0.46}K_{0.05}Pb_{0.02}Rb_{0.01}Cs_{0.01})_{Σ0.55}Cl_{1.07}. Taking into account structural data, the simplified formula is [Cu_{5}O_{2}](AsO_{4})(VO_{4})·(Cu_{0.5}□_{0.5})Cl. Aleutite is soluble in hot H_{2}O.

== Chemical composition ==
Constituent	wt%	Range
MoO_{3}	0.83	0.62 – 1.02
As_{2}O_{5}	18.33	17.77 – 19.83
V_{2}O_{5}	11.13	10.56 – 11.85
Fe_{2}O_{3}	0.36	10.56 – 11.85
CuO	62.73	61.79 – 63.54
ZnO	0.60	0.39 – 0.77
PbO	0.75	0.59 – 0.98
CaO	0.10	0.00 – 0.22
K_{2}O	0.35	0.24 – 0.47
Cs_{2}O	0.16	0.05 – 0.31
Rb_{2}O	0.18	0.09 – 0.27
Cl	5.54	5.40 – 5.78
-Cl=O	1.25	
Total	99.81	100.02 – 101.83

== X-ray crystallography ==
Aleutite is in the monoclinic crystal system and has a space group of C2/m. Its unit cell dimensions are as follows: a = 18.0788(9) Å, b = 6.2270(5) Å, c = 8.2445(3) Å, β = 90.56(4)º, V = 928.09(7) Å^{3}, Z = 4. Aleutite has a point group of 2/m. The [Cu_{5}O_{2}]_{6+} band in aleutite can be considered part of a kagome network.

== See also ==
List of Minerals
