= Europium phosphate =

Europium phosphate may refer to:

- Europium(II) phosphate, Eu_{3}(PO_{4})_{2}
- Europium(III) phosphate, EuPO_{4}
- Europium pentaphosphate, EuP_{5}O_{14}
