= Blossite =

General
- Category: Vanadate mineral
- Formula: CuV_{2}O_{7}
- IMA symbol: Blo
- Strunz classification: 8.FA.05
- Dana classification: 38.5.6.1
- Crystal system: Orthorhombic
- Crystal class: Pyramidal (mm2) (same H-M symbol)
- Space group: Fdd2
- Unit cell: a = 20.676(6) Å, b = 8.392(3) Å, c = 6.446(2) Å; Z = 8

Identification
- Color: Black, white in reflected light, red-brown internal reflections
- Crystal habit: Anhedral crystals and intergrowths
- Luster: Metallic
- Streak: Red brown
- Diaphaneity: Opaque
- Specific gravity: 3.95 – 3.97 (measured on synthetic material) 4.05 (calculated)
- Optical properties: Biaxial
- Refractive index: 2.05
- Birefringence: Bireflectance: weak to moderate: cream-white shades

Blossite is an anhydrous copper vanadate mineral with the formula: Cu^{2+}V^{5+}_{2}O_{7}. Blossite was named for mineralogist F. Donald Bloss of Virginia Polytechnic Institute and State University.

== Natural and synthetic occurrence ==
Blossite was first described for an occurrence in the “Y” fumarole in the summit crater of Izalco Volcano, El Salvador. There it occurs with several high-temperature minerals including: stoiberite, fingerite, ziesite, and mcbirneyite. The natural analogues of these compounds crystallize in the CuO-V_{2}O_{5} binary system first studied by Brisi and Molinari (1958) and were first discovered as synthetic compounds. Blossite is the low temperature polymorph of ziesite, β-Cu_{2}V_{2}O_{7}. All of the blossite crystals identified to date are inter-grown with other fumarolic copper vanadates. The discovered location of these copper vanadates, in the outer sulfate zone of the fumarole, indicates a sublimation temperature between 100 °C and 200 °C.

== Physical properties ==
Blossite occurs as black anhedral crystals, with dimensions not exceeding 150 um. Crystals of blossite have only been isolated with other fumarolic copper vanadates or sulfates. Blossite demonstrates a red-brown streak, prevalent to the natural copper present, this red-brown coloring is also a prevalent in the internal reflections. No cleavage is observed in blossite, but the size of the natural mineral grains of polycrystalline prohibit the identification of cleavage. In ultraviolet radiation blossite does not fluoresce, it demonstrates a white color when blue-filtered white light in air is present, and is opaque to transmitted light. The density of natural occurring blossite is 4.051 g/cm^{3}.

== Composition ==
The chemical formula of blossite is, Cu_{2}^{2+}V_{2}^{5+}O_{7}. Robison et al. conducted quantitative analyses using an ETEC Autoscan microprobe operating at 20kv on a polished sample of blossite-fingerite intergrowth, the results of the oxide weight percentage. Chemical analysis V_{2}O_{5} 53.28%, CuO 46.49% :Total 99.77%; Ideal chemical formula:V_{2}O_{5} 53.34%, CuO 46.66%:Total 100%. Blossite is the only stable phase of the Cu_{2}V_{5}O_{7} compounds at ambient conditions. The structure A2B2X7, is mostly associated with B= P and V, the B2O7 groups orient and fluctuate size based on the electronic structure of the A cation. Blossite’s atomic structure is formed when three Cu-O bonds are broken during the phase change. The phase transition is of the non-nearest-neighbor reconstructive type, relative high activation energy is required for the phase change. Blossite is also formed when the fumarole temperatures are lower than inversion temperatures of 710 °C (1,310 °F).

== Crystal structure ==
Blossite is part of the copper vanadates class, the V^{5+} form a tetrahedral coordination surrounded by oxygen atoms. The VO_{4} tetrahedra is closely related to thortvetite-group compounds by the formation of [V_{2}O_{7}]^{4−}. The [V_{2}O_{7}] planes lie along [100], the divanadate units are staggered orienting the V-OB-V vector parallel to [120] in one plane and parallel to [120] in the adjacent plane. The independent copper cation in blossite forms as a polyhedral structure coordinated by five oxygen atoms forming an apically elongate square pyramid. The shared edges of CuO_{5} from chains that lay parallel to [011] and [011], this orientation is common in the three polymorphs of Cu_{2}V_{2}O_{7}. Blossite structure represented in a block form by Krivovichev et al. represents two series of slabs with both lying perpendicular in orientation.
