= Glauberite =

Monoclinic sodium calcium sulfate mineral

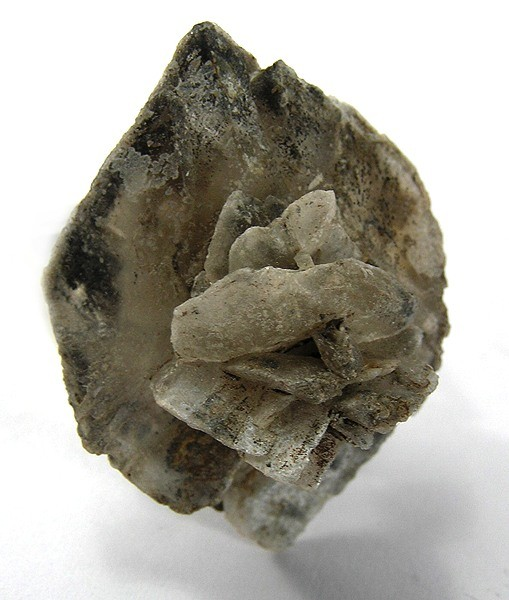
- Glauberite crystal group from the Bertram Siding Sulfate deposit, Imperial County, California

General
- Category: Sulfate minerals, anhydrous sulfate subgroup
- Formula: Na_{2}Ca(SO_{4})_{2}
- IMA symbol: Glb
- Strunz classification: 7.AD.25
- Crystal system: Monoclinic
- Crystal class: Prismatic (2/m) (same H-M symbol)
- Space group: C2/c
- Unit cell: a = 10.129, b = 8.306 c = 8.533 [Å]; β = 112.19°; Z = 4

Identification
- Color: Gray or pale yellow, colorless
- Crystal habit: Tabular prismatic crystals
- Cleavage: Perfect on {001}, imperfect on {110}
- Fracture: Conchoidal
- Tenacity: Brittle
- Mohs scale hardness: 2.5–3
- Luster: Vitreous to waxy, pearly on cleavages
- Streak: White
- Diaphaneity: Transparent to translucent
- Specific gravity: 2.75–2.85
- Optical properties: Biaxial (−)
- Refractive index: n_{α} = 1.507 – 1.515 n_{β} = 1.527 – 1.535 n_{γ} = 1.529 – 1.536
- Birefringence: δ = 0.022
- 2V angle: 24° to 34°
- Dispersion: strong r > v
- Solubility: HCl and H_{2}O (water) soluble
- Alters to: readily alters to gypsum
- Other characteristics: often a pseudomorph

Glauberite is a monoclinic sodium calcium sulfate mineral with the formula Na_{2}Ca(SO_{4})_{2}.

It was first described in 1808 for material from the El Castellar Mine, Villarrubia de Santiago, Toledo, Castile-La Mancha, Spain. It was named for the extracted Glauber's salts after the German alchemist Johann Rudolf Glauber (1604–1668).

Glauberite often forms in continental and marine evaporite deposits, but may also form from hydrothermal deposits, as mineral sublimates deposited near fumaroles, in amygdules in basalt, and in nitrate deposits in arid climates. It occurs associated with halite, polyhalite, anhydrite, gypsum, thenardite, mirabilite, sassolite and blodite.

Because of its solubility, glauberite is often dissolved away from the crystal matrix leaving a distinctly shaped hollow cast. Its mineral composition is readily altered into other minerals as pseudomorphs. Gypsum pseudomorphs are common due to increased humidity.

Glauberite, its cast impressions, and its pseudomorphed crystals are often easily recognizable due to its common crystal twinning, and crystal habit displayed by uniquely shaped flattened, often seeming rhombohedral, large individual 'floater crystals'.

The mineral is commercially mined for its sulfate contents.
