= Piypite =

Rare potassium, copper sulfate mineral

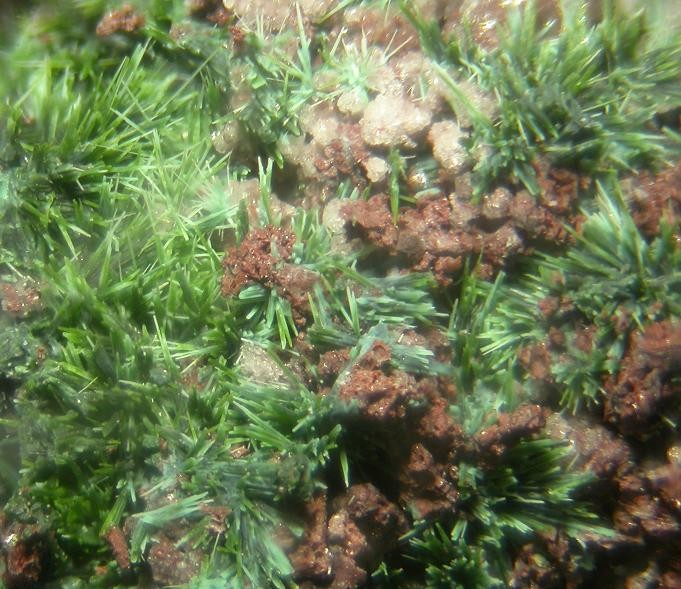
- Green acicular crystals of piypite

General
- Category: Sulfate mineral
- Formula: K_{2}Cu_{2}O(SO_{4})_{2}
- IMA symbol: Piy
- Strunz classification: 7.BC.40
- Crystal system: Tetragonal
- Crystal class: Pyramidal (4); H-M symbol: (4)
- Space group: I4
- Unit cell: a = 13.6 Å, c = 4.95 Å; Z = 2

Identification
- Color: Emerald-green, dark green, black
- Crystal habit: Acicular crystals elongated along [001], square cross section, commonly hollow; also as mosslike aggregates
- Cleavage: Perfect, parallel to elongation
- Tenacity: Brittle
- Mohs scale hardness: 2.5
- Luster: Vitreous to greasy
- Streak: Yellowish green
- Diaphaneity: Transparent to translucent
- Specific gravity: 3.0 - 3.1
- Optical properties: Uniaxial (+)
- Refractive index: n_{ω} = 1.583 n_{ε} = 1.695
- Birefringence: δ = 0.112
- Pleochroism: Distinct; O = pale green, yellowish green; E = deep green, pale yellowish green
- Solubility: Soluble in water, leaves residue

Piypite is a rare potassium, copper sulfate mineral with formula: K_{2}Cu_{2}O(SO_{4})_{2}. It crystallizes in the tetragonal system and occurs as needlelike crystals and masses. Individual crystals are square in cross-section and often hollow. It is emerald green to black in color with a vitreous to greasy luster.

It was first described in 1982 for an occurrence in the Main Fracture of the Tolbachik volcano, Kamchatka Oblast, Russia. It has also been reported from Mount Vesuvius, Italy, and in a slag deposit in the Bad Ems District in the Rhineland-Palatinate, Germany. Piypite occurs as a sublimate phase in a fumarole environment. Associated minerals include halite, sylvite, langbeinite, tenorite, hematite, tolbachite, dolerophanite, urusovite, aphthitalite, ponomarevite, cotunnite, chalcocyanite, sofiite, euchlorine, averievite, fedotovite, alarsite, alumoklyuchevskite, nabokoite and lammerite at the type locality in Kamchatka. On Vesuvius, it occurs with paratacamite.
