= Fingerite =

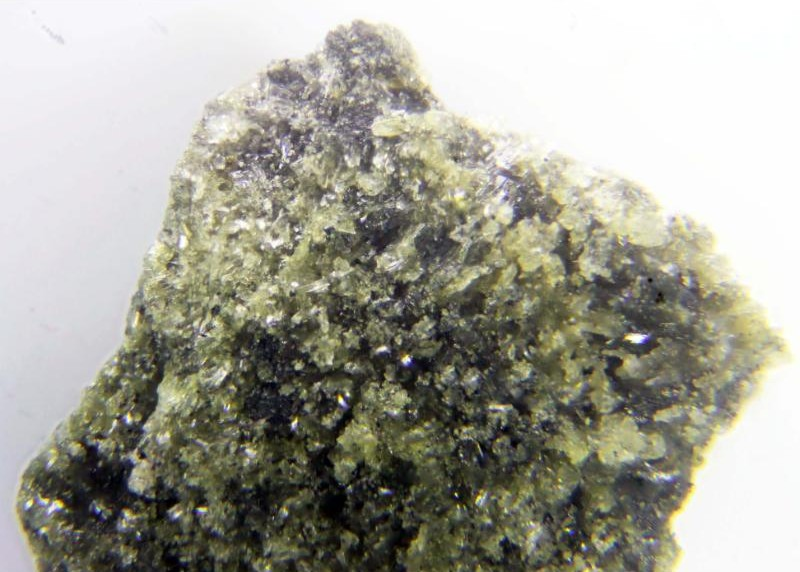
- Image of a Fingerite

General
- Category: Vanadate mineral
- Formula: β-Cu_{2}V_{2}O_{5}
- IMA symbol: Fgr
- Strunz classification: 8.BB.80
- Crystal system: Triclinic
- Crystal class: Pinacoidal (1̅); H-M symbol: (1̅)
- Space group: P1̅
- Unit cell: a = 8.16, b = 8.27 c = 8.04 [Å]; α = 107.14° β = 91.39°, γ = 106.44°; Z = 1

Identification
- Color: Black; medium gray in reflected light
- Crystal habit: Subhedral or anhedral; equant or platelike; up to 150 μm
- Cleavage: None
- Luster: Metallic
- Streak: Dark reddish brown
- Diaphaneity: Opaque
- Density: 4.78
- Optical properties: Biaxial
- Solubility: Dissolves in water

Fingerite is a copper vanadate mineral with formula: β-Cu_{2}V_{2}O_{5}. It was discovered as triclinic crystals occurring as volcanic sublimates around fumaroles in the crater of the Izalco Volcano, El Salvador.

Associated minerals include thenardite, euchlorine, stoiberite, shcherbinaite, ziesite, bannermanite, chalcocyanite and chalcanthite. The mineral also dissolves in water.

Fingerite is named for Dr. Larry W. Finger (1940–2024) of the Geophysical Laboratory, Carnegie Institution of Washington.
