= Los Volcanes National Park =

National park in El Salvador

Coordinates: 13.8272°N 89.6233°W

Santa Ana volcano (background, far right) with Izalco to the far left, Cerro Verde center and San Marcelino vents in the foreground.

Parque Nacional Los Volcanes, also known as Cerro Verde National Park, is a large national park in El Salvador.

The park includes three volcanoes: Cerro Verde, Izalco, and Santa Ana.
