= Itelmenite =

Rare sulfate mineral

General
- Category: Sulfate
- Formula: Na_{4}Mg_{3}Cu_{3}(SO_{4})_{8}
- IMA symbol: Itm
- Crystal system: Orthorhombic
- Crystal class: Dipyramidal (mmm); H-M symbol: (2/m 2/m 2/m)
- Space group: Pbca
- Unit cell: a = 9.57, b = 8.79 c = 28.72 [Å] (approximated)

Identification

Itelmenite is a rare sulfate mineral with the formula Na_{4}Mg_{3}Cu_{3}(SO_{4})_{8}. It is one of many fumarolic minerals discovered on the Tolbachik volcano.

== Relation to other minerals ==
Saranchinaite and dravertite are examples of other anhydrous complex copper-bearing sulfates, also coming from the Tolbachik volcano.
