= Mirabilite =

Decahydrated sodium sulfate mineral

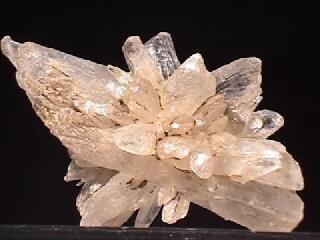

General
- Category: Sulfate minerals
- Formula: Na_{2}SO_{4}·10H_{2}O
- IMA symbol: Mrb
- Strunz classification: 7.CD.10
- Crystal system: Monoclinic
- Crystal class: Prismatic (2/m) (same H-M symbol)
- Space group: P2_{1}/c

Identification
- Formula mass: 322.9 g/mol
- Color: Colorless, white, yellowish-white, greenish-white
- Crystal habit: Granular or well-formed coarse crystals
- Twinning: Interpenetration twinning on {001}; also on {100}
- Cleavage: {100} perfect, {001} poor, {010} poor
- Fracture: Conchoidal
- Mohs scale hardness: 1.5–2
- Luster: Vitreous
- Streak: White
- Diaphaneity: Transparent to translucent to opaque
- Specific gravity: 1.49
- Optical properties: Biaxial (–), 2V=75.93°
- Refractive index: n_{α} = 1.396, n_{β} = 1.4103, n_{γ} = 1.419
- Birefringence: δ = 0.023
- Pleochroism: none
- Other characteristics: Not radioactive, non-fluorescent

Mirabilite, also known as Glauber's salt, is a hydrous sodium sulfate mineral with the chemical formula Na_{2}SO_{4}·10H_{2}O. It is a vitreous, colorless to white monoclinic mineral that forms as an evaporite from sodium sulfate-bearing brines. It is found around saline springs and along saline playa lakes. Associated minerals include gypsum, halite, thenardite, trona, glauberite, and epsomite.

Mirabilite is unstable and quickly dehydrates in dry air, the prismatic crystals turning into a white powder, thenardite (Na_{2}SO_{4}). In turn, thenardite can also absorb water and converts to mirabilite.

Mirabilite is used as a purgative and anti-inflammatory remedy in the Traditional Chinese medicine; in Mandarin, it is called máng xiāo 硭硝. The name 'mirabilite' is based on the phrase "Sal mirabilis" (Latin for "wonderful salt") used by Johann Rudolph Glauber when he inadvertently synthesized mirabilite.

Mirabilite is found in several areas within the Mammoth Cave System, where it appears to have been mined by Late Archaic and Early Woodland peoples, probably for use as a laxative.

Four mirabilite mounds were documented on the south shore of the Great Salt Lake, Utah, United States in January 2020. These developed where springs surfaced along the beach, which had been exposed due to lower lake elevations, and cold air helped preserve the salt precipitate. This was documented by the Utah Geological Survey as well as reported in the press.

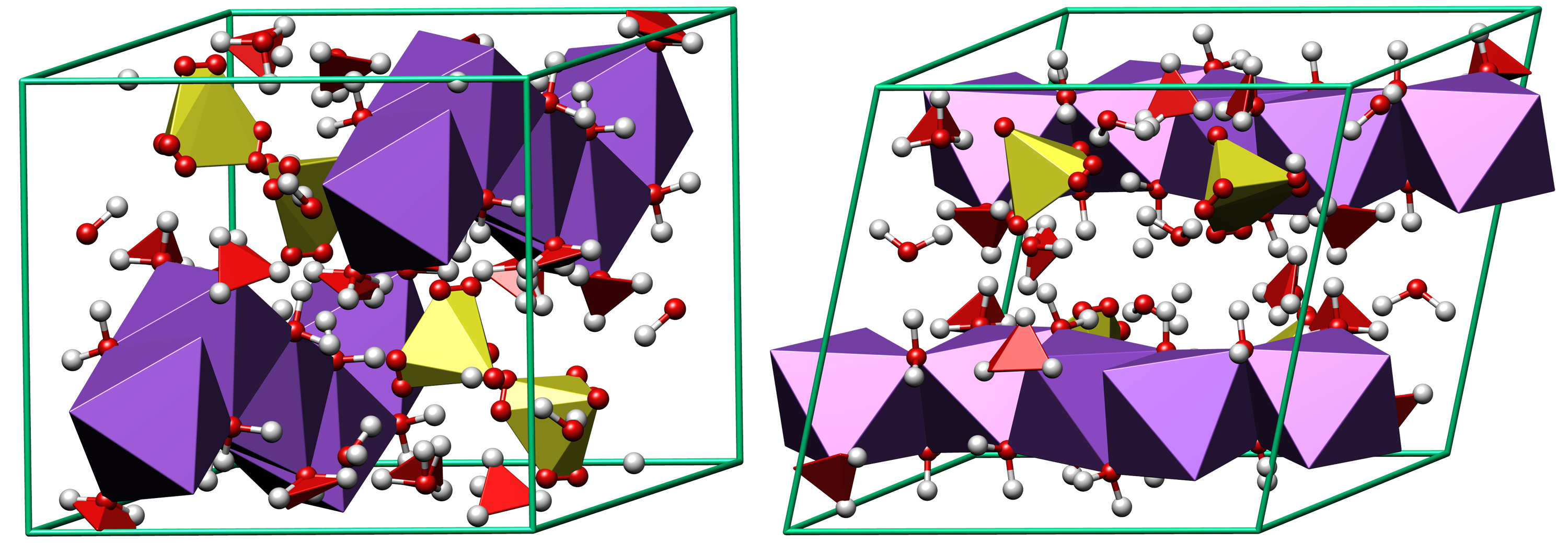
Crystal structure of mirabilite
