= Ziesite =

Mineral

General
- Category: Vanadate mineral
- Formula: β-Cu_{2}V_{2}O_{7}
- IMA symbol: Zie
- Strunz classification: 8.FA.10
- Crystal system: Monoclinic
- Crystal class: Prismatic (2/m) (same H-M symbol)
- Space group: A2/a
- Unit cell: a = 7.68 Å, b = 8 Å c = 10.09 Å; β = 110.27°; Z = 2

Identification
- Color: Black; reddish brown to dark reddish brown in transmitted light; white in reflected light
- Crystal habit: Anhedral crystals and incrustations
- Cleavage: None
- Luster: Metallic
- Streak: Red brown
- Diaphaneity: Opaque
- Specific gravity: 3.86
- Optical properties: Biaxial
- Refractive index: 2.055

Ziesite is a copper vanadate mineral with formula: β-Cu_{2}V_{2}O_{7}. It was discovered in 1980 as monoclinic crystals occurring as volcanic sublimates around fumaroles in the crater of the Izalco Volcano, El Salvador. It is named after Emanuel George Zies (1883–1981), an American geochemist who studied Izalco in the 1930s.

Closely related is blossite, also a copper vanadate with formula of α-Cu_{2}V_{2}O_{7}. It forms orthorhombic crystals. Blossite was also first described for specimens from the Izalco volcano.

Ziesite and blossite are polymorphs, different crystal structure for the same chemical composition and are quite similar in physical properties.

Associated minerals include stoiberite, shcherbinaite, bannermanite, fingerite, mcbirneyite, blossite, chalcocyanite and chalcanthite.
