= Europium(II) phosphate =

Names
- Other names Europium(II) orthophosphate

Identifiers
CAS Number	22206-18-4
3D model (JSmol)	Interactive image
ChemSpider	20138070
PubChem CID	20836114
- InChI: InChI=1S/3Eu.2H3O4P/c;;;2*1-5(2,3)4/h;;;2*(H3,1,2,3,4)/q3*+2;;/p-6 Key: FEHWILWCIYBTEH-UHFFFAOYSA-H
- SMILES: [O-]P(=O)([O-])[O-].[O-]P(=O)([O-])[O-].[Eu+2].[Eu+2].[Eu+2]

Properties
Chemical formula	Eu_{3}(PO_{4})_{2}
Molar mass	645.83 g/mol
Appearance	Grey solid

Structure
Crystal structure	Trigonal, palmierite type
Space group	R3̅m, No. 166
Lattice constant	a = 0.53931 nm, c = 1.9843 nm
Formula units (Z)	3
- Except where otherwise noted, data are given for materials in their standard state (at 25 °C [77 °F], 100 kPa). Infobox references

Europium(II) phosphate is an inorganic compound of europium and phosphate with the chemical formula Eu_{3}(PO_{4})_{2}. It contains europium exclusively in the +2 oxidation state and is one of several anhydrous europium phosphates known in the Eu–P–O system.

== Structure and properties ==
Europium(II) phosphate is a grey crystalline solid. It crystallizes in the trigonal crystal system with the palmierite structure and is isotypic with Sr_{3}(PO_{4})_{2}.

The space group is R3̅m (No. 166). Refined lattice parameters are a = 5.3931(2) Å and c = 19.843(1) Å, with three formula units per unit cell.

The structure contains isolated PO_{4} tetrahedra and two crystallographically distinct europium sites. Its structural relationship to Sr_{3}(PO_{4})_{2} reflects the similar ionic radii of Eu^{2+} and Sr^{2+}.

Europium(II) phosphate is stable in air up to about 100 °C. At higher temperatures, oxidation of Eu^{2+} leads to formation of more oxidized europium phosphate phases.

=== Magnetic properties ===
Eu_{3}(PO_{4})_{2} is strongly magnetic because Eu^{2+} has a 4f^{7} electronic configuration. Early measurements identified the compound as ferromagnetic.

Later magnetic susceptibility measurements found magnetic ordering below about 5 K. More recent work places the magnetic transition at approximately 5.9 K and describes it as a ferromagnetic-to-paramagnetic transition.

The 2023 study also reported a substantial low-temperature magnetocaloric effect, with a maximum magnetic entropy change of about 11.4 J kg^{−1} K^{−1} for a field change of 0–1 T near the magnetic ordering temperature.

== Preparation ==
Europium(II) phosphate can be prepared by reducing a mixture of europium(III) phosphate and europium(III) oxide in a stream of hydrogen at about 950 °C:

4 EuPO_{4} + Eu_{2}O_{3} + 3 H_{2} → 2 Eu_{3}(PO_{4})_{2} + 3 H_{2}O

Earlier preparations of divalent europium compounds also obtained Eu_{3}(PO_{4})_{2} under strongly reducing conditions.

A sol–gel route has also been used to prepare polycrystalline Eu_{3}(PO_{4})_{2} for magnetic and magnetocaloric measurements.
