= Alarsite =

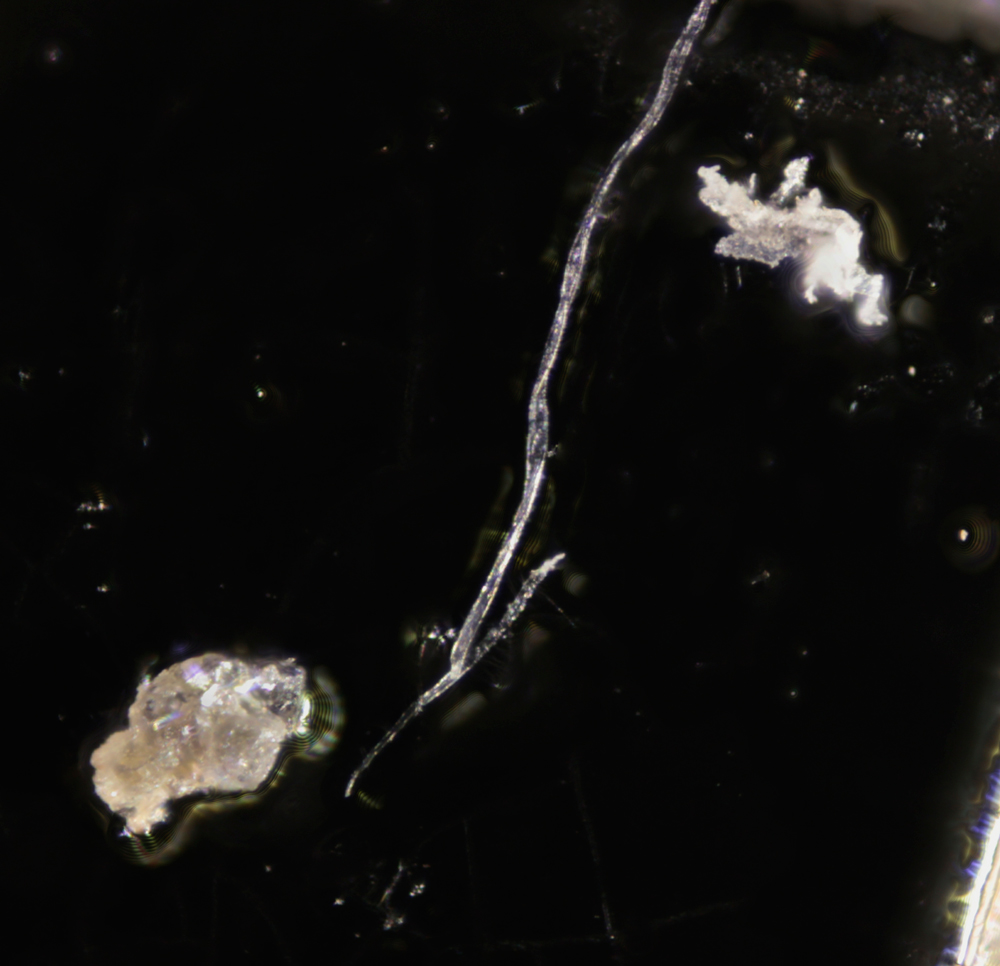
- Alarsite crystals found at Tolbachik

General
- Category: Minerals
- IMA symbol: Ars
- Crystal system: trigonal
- Crystal class: aluminium arsenate
- Space group: P3_{1}21 (no. 152) or P3_{2}21 (no. 154)

Identification
- Colour: colorless with pale yellow tints
- Mohs scale hardness: 5-5.5
- Luster: vitreous luster
- Specific gravity: 3.32.
- Refractive index: nω = 1.596 and nε = 1.608.

Alarsite (AlAsO_{4}) is an aluminium arsenate mineral with its name derived from its composition: aluminium and arsenate. It occurs as brittle subhedral grains which exhibit trigonal symmetry. It has a Mohs hardness of 5-5.5 and a specific gravity of 3.32. It is semitransparent, colorless with pale yellow tints and shows a vitreous luster. It is optically uniaxial (+) with refractive indices of n_{ω} = 1.596 and n_{ε} = 1.608.

It was reported from fumaroles in the Tolbachik volcano, Kamchatka, Far Eastern Region, Russia. It occurs in association with fedotovite, klyuchevskite, lammerite, nabokoite, atlasovite, langbeinite, hematite and tenorite.
