= Lyonsite =

General
- Category: Vanadate mineral
- Formula: Cu_{3}Fe^{+3}_{4}(VO_{4})_{6}
- IMA symbol: Lyo
- Strunz classification: 8.AB.40
- Crystal system: Orthorhombic
- Crystal class: Dipyramidal (mmm); H-M symbol: (2/m 2/m 2/m)
- Space group: Pmcn
- Unit cell: a = 10.29, b = 17.2 c = 4.91 [Å]; Z = 2

Identification
- Color: Black; creamy white in reflected light in polished section
- Crystal habit: As euhedral flattened lath shaped crystals
- Cleavage: Good on {001}
- Tenacity: Brittle
- Luster: Metallic
- Streak: Dark gray
- Diaphaneity: Opaque
- Specific gravity: 4.215 calculated

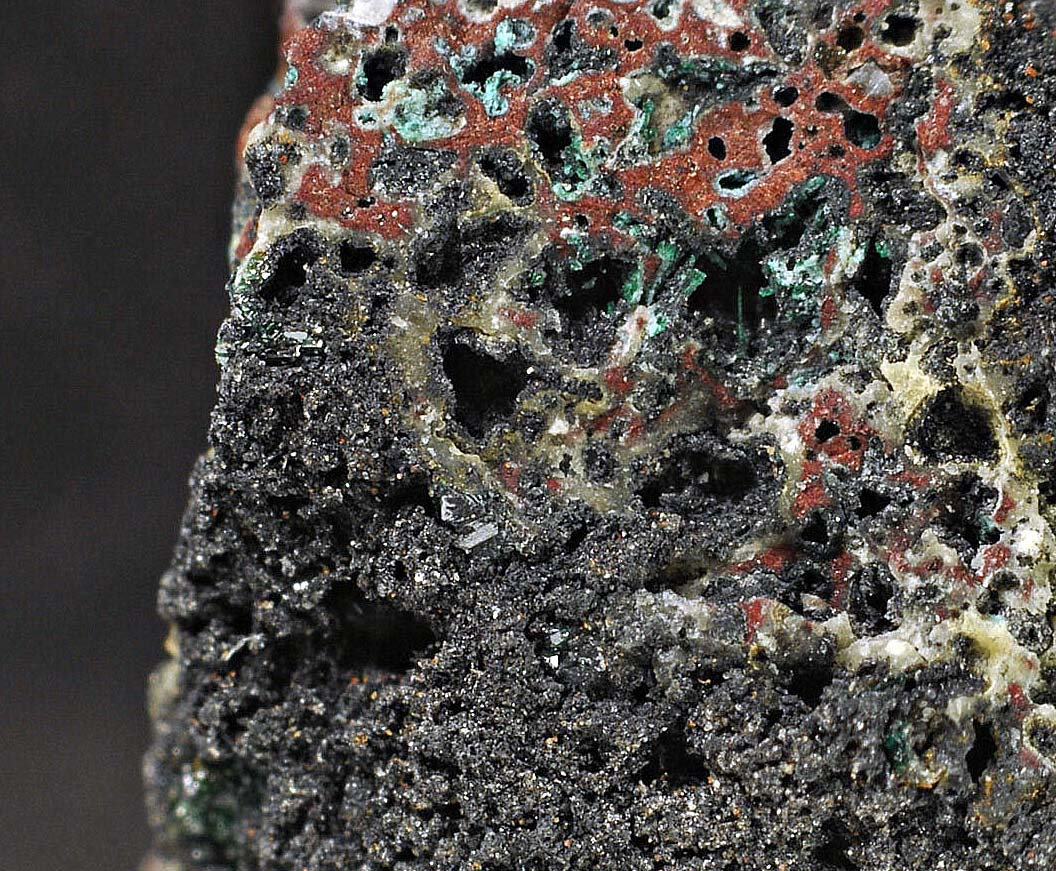
Rock containing lyonsite

Lyonsite (Cu_{3}Fe^{+3}_{4}(VO_{4})_{6}) is a rare black vanadate mineral that is opaque with a metallic lustre. It crystallizes in the orthorhombic crystal system. Lyonsite often occurs as small tabular typically well formed crystals. Lyonsite has a good cleavage and a dark gray streak.

Lyonsite occurs as a sublimate in volcanic fumaroles. It is often associated with howardevansite and thenardite. It was first described in 1987 for an occurrence on the Izalco volcano, El Salvador. It was named for mineralogist John Bartholomew Lyons (1916–1998) of Dartmouth College. It has also been reported from a mine dump in the Lichtenberg Absetzer Mine of Thuringia, Germany.
