= Europium(III) phosphate =

Identifiers
CAS Number	13537-10-5; hydrate: 14913-20-3; 15259-63-9 semihydrate; dihydrate: 34377-51-0; trihydrate: 49836-68-2
3D model (JSmol)	Interactive image; hydrate: Interactive image; dihydrate: Interactive image; trihydrate: Interactive image
ChemSpider	4896052
ECHA InfoCard	100.033.532
EC Number	236-901-2; hydrate: 693-463-9
PubChem CID	6365242; hydrate: 16217374
CompTox Dashboard (EPA)	DTXSID80928975; hydrate: DTXSID20584352
- InChI: InChI=1S/Eu.H3O4P/c;1-5(2,3)4/h;(H3,1,2,3,4)/p-3 Key: VTZYNNDLDPSINP-UHFFFAOYSA-K; hydrate: InChI=1S/Eu.H3O4P.H2O/c;1-5(2,3)4;/h;(H3,1,2,3,4);1H2/q+3;;/p-3 Key: BOCFVANIXFYKBV-UHFFFAOYSA-K
- SMILES: [O-]P(=O)I([O-])[O-].[Eu+3]; hydrate: [O-]P(=O)I([O-])[O-].[Eu+3].O; dihydrate: [O-]P(=O)I([O-])[O-].[Eu+3].O.O; trihydrate: [O-]P(=O)I([O-])[O-].[Eu+3].O.O.O

Properties
Chemical formula	EuO_{4}P
Molar mass	246.934 g·mol^{−1}
Appearance	colourless solid
Density	5.81 g·cm^{−3}
Melting point	2,200 °C (3,990 °F; 2,470 K)
Solubility in water	insoluble

Structure
Crystal structure	Monazite
Space group	P2_{1}/n (No. 14)
Lattice constant	a = 668.13(10), b = 686.18(9), c = 634.91(8) pm α = 90°, β = 103.96(1)°, γ = 90°

Thermochemistry
Heat capacity (C)	111.5 J/mol·K
- Except where otherwise noted, data are given for materials in their standard state (at 25 °C [77 °F], 100 kPa). Infobox references

Europium(III) phosphate is one of the phosphates of europium, with the chemical formula of EuPO_{4}. Other phosphates include europium(II) phosphate (Eu_{3}(PO_{4})_{2}) and europium(II,III) phosphate (Eu_{3}Eu(PO_{4})_{3}).

== Preparation ==
Europium phosphate can be produced by the sol-gel method of europium(III) oxide. First, europium(III) oxide was dissolved in an equimolar amount of nitric acid, and then an excess of 10% phosphoric acid was added. The process also requires the addition of ammonia to adjust the pH to 4 and form a gel, which is then washed with water and heated to 1200 °C for a day.

== Properties ==
Europium(III) phosphate is isotypic to CePO_{4} and crystallizes in the monazite structure type, in the space group P2_{1}/n (no. 14, position 2) with the lattice parameters a = 668.13(10), b = 686.18(9), c = 634.91(8) pm and β = 103.96(1)° with four formula units per unit cell. Its heat capacity is 111.5 J·K^{−1}·mol^{−1} at 298.15 K, and its bulk modulus is 159(2) GPa.
