= Petrovite =

General
- Category: Minerals
- Formula: Na_{10}CaCu_{2}(SO_{4})_{8}

Identification
- Color: Blue, green

Petrovite is a blue and green mineral, with the chemical formula of Na_{10}CaCu_{2}(SO_{4})_{8}. It contains atoms of oxygen (O), sodium (Na), sulphur (S), calcium (Ca) and copper (Cu) in a porous framework. It has potential as a cathode material in sodium-ion rechargeable batteries.

It was discovered in volcanic lava flows in the Kamchatka region of Russia's far east and first described in 2020.
