= Hermannjahnite =

Rare sulfate mineral

General
- Category: Sulfate
- Formula: CuZn(SO_{4})_{2}
- IMA symbol: Hjh
- Crystal system: Monoclinic
- Crystal class: Prismatic (2/m) (same H-M symbol)
- Space group: P2_{1}/n
- Unit cell: a = 4.81, b = 8.48, c = 6.76 [Å], β = 93.04° (approximated)

Identification

Hermannjahnite is a rare sulfate mineral with the relatively simple formula CuZn(SO_{4})_{2}. It is one of many fumarolic minerals discovered on the Tolbachik volcano.

== Relation to other minerals ==
Hermannjahnite is a zinc-analogue of dravertite – another mineral from prolific Tolbachik. Minerals somewhat chemically similar to hermannjahnite include ktenasite and christelite.
