= Izalco (volcano) =

Active stratovolcano in El Salvador

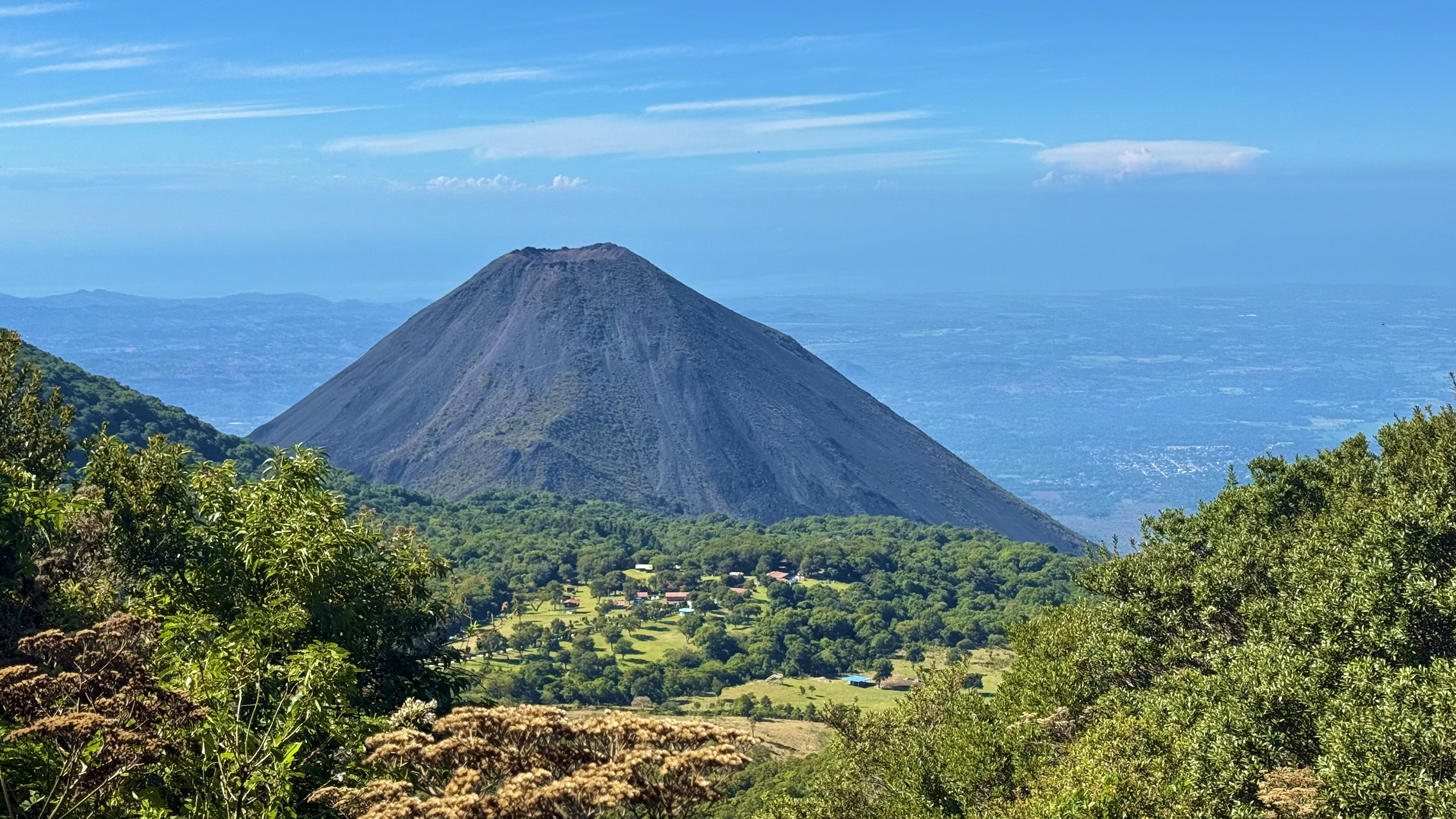
- Izalco Volcano as seen from Santa Ana Volcano (2025)

Highest point
- Elevation: 1,950 m (6,400 ft)
- Coordinates: 13°48′47″N 89°37′59″W

Geography
- Location within El Salvador
- Location: El Salvador
- Parent range: Cordillera de Apaneca
- Topo map: yes

Geology
- Mountain type: Stratovolcano
- Rock type(s): Andesite, Basaltic andesite
- Volcanic arc: Central America Volcanic Arc
- Last eruption: October to November 1966

Izalco is an active stratovolcano on the southern flank of the Santa Ana Volcano in western El Salvador. Formed in 1770, it erupted almost continuously until 1958, earning the nickname "Lighthouse of the Pacific". It experienced a flank eruption in 1966. An eruption in 1926 buried the village of Matazano, killing 56 people. The volcano is surrounded by fertile agricultural land historically used for growing coffee, cacao, and sugar cane.

== Geology and mineralogy ==
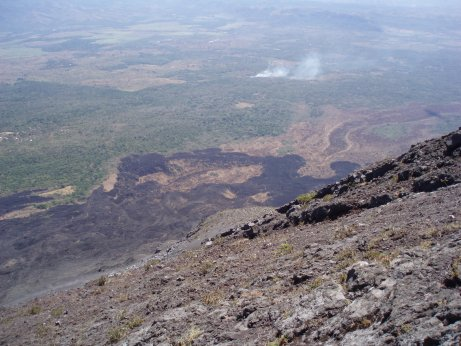
Lava flow of the 1966 flank eruption over the much older lava flow. This image looks towards the south from the slope of Izalco

The lava historically erupted from Izalco consists of vesicular vitrophyric olivine basalts. Izalco's formation was preceded by fumorolic activity in 1658, before Izalco was born in 1770. Today, Izalco experiences only fumarolic activity in the form of rainwater seeping into the volcano and contacting hot rocks, rather than steam emissions from underground gases. The fumarole deposits of the volcano are noted as sources for several rare minerals. It is the type locality for the copper vanadium minerals: bannermanite, blossite, fingerite, howardevansite, lyonsite, mcbirneyite, stoiberite and ziesite.

== Tourism ==
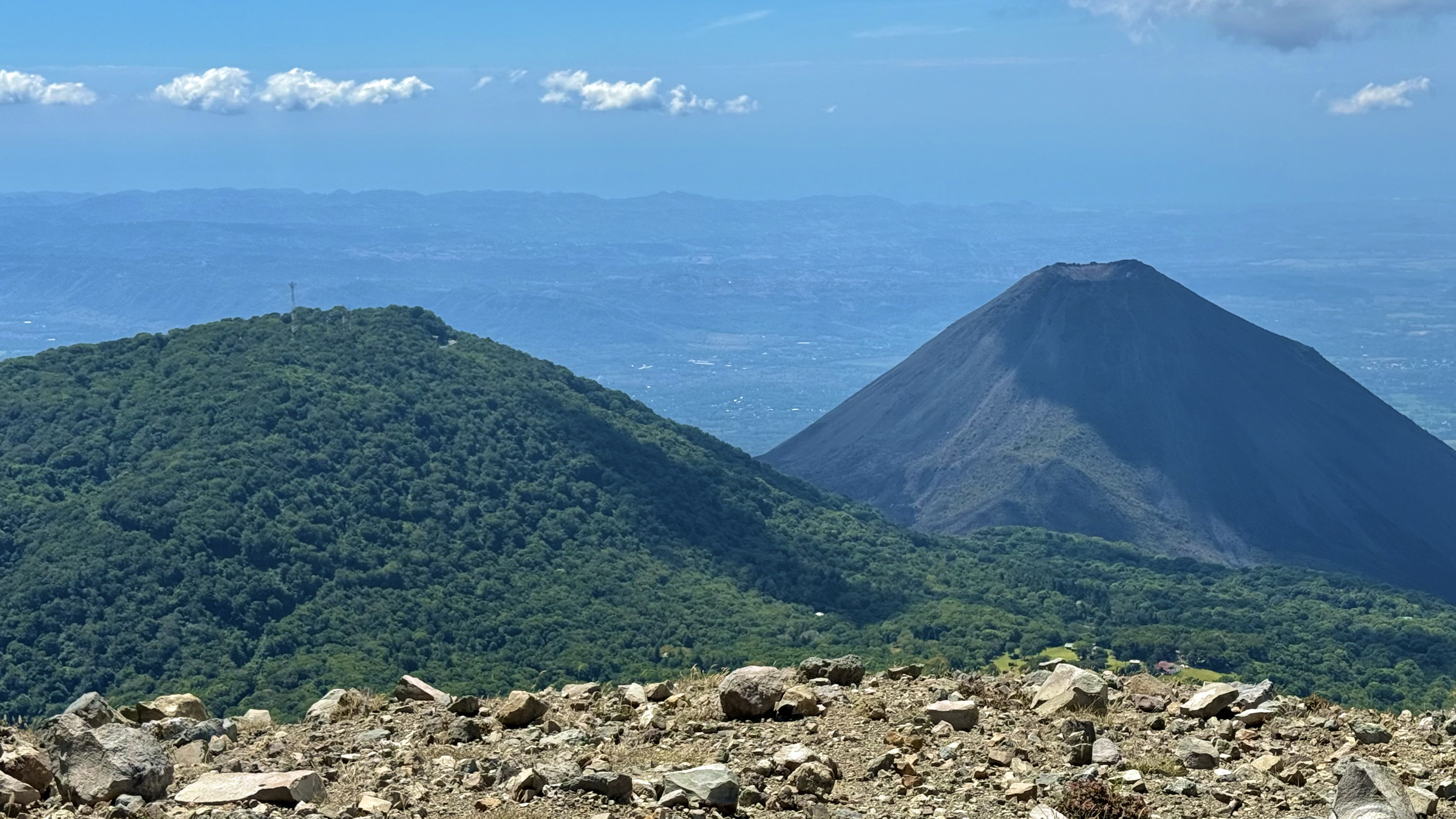
The volcano is next to Cerro Verde

The volcano is visited and climbed regularly by tourists to El Salvador via the Cerro Verde National Park and is a national icon of the country. It was featured on the 10 colón bank note, although this bank note was removed from circulation when US dollars replaced the colon in 2001. The volcano is currently quiescent but may erupt again.

A hotel was built on the nearby Cerro Verde to provide accommodation with a view of the erupting volcano, but the volcano ceased to erupt shortly before the hotel was completed.

=== Izalco Volcano National Symbolism ===
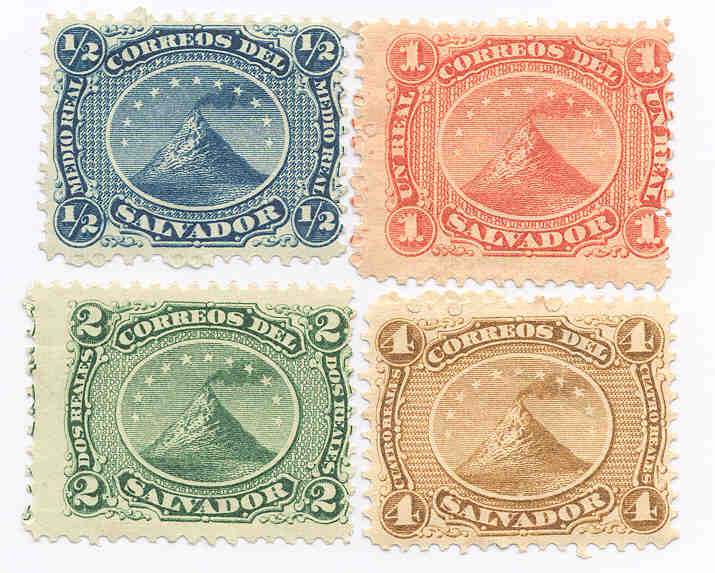
Izalco volcano: first Salvadoran postage stamps

The volcano on the stamps' central oval design is an allegorical representation of the coat of arms existing at the time; the stamps depict the Izalco volcano, popularly known as "El Faro del Pacífico" - "The Lighthouse of the Pacific". This argument is based on the fact that the decree signed by Francisco Duenas, creating the coat of arms, specifically mentions the Izalco volcano as the inspiration for its design, and also on the idea that the Izalco volcano was (and still is) one of the symbols of the country. Covers genuinely used with these stamps are rare. So far, only 37 have been recorded.

== See also ==
- List of volcanoes in El Salvador
- List of stratovolcanoes
