= Mutnovsky =

Volcano in Kamchatka Peninsula, Russia

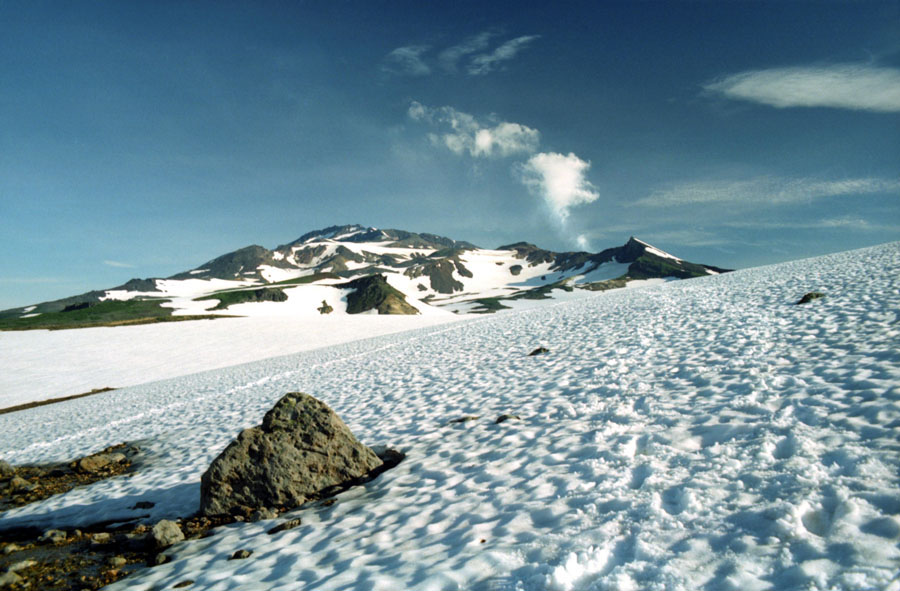
- Mutnovsky in July 2006

Highest point
- Elevation: 2,322 m (7,618 ft)
- Prominence: 1,750 m (5,740 ft)
- Listing: Ultra, Ribu
- Coordinates: 52°26′54″N 158°11′51″E

Geography
- Location within Kamchatka Krai Location within Russia
- Location: Kamchatka, Russia
- Parent range: Eastern Range

Geology
- Mountain type: Complex volcano
- Last eruption: 1 July 2026

Mutnovsky (Russian: Мутновский) is an active complex volcano located in the southern part of Kamchatka Peninsula, Russia, approximately 75-80 km south of Petropavlovsk-Kamchatsky. The volcano is formed from several cones and lava flows from flank eruptions that have merged into a single massif.

== Geology and structure ==
Mutnovsky is a complex volcanic edifice consisting of four merged cones. The volcano has two main craters - southwestern and northeastern - each about 2 km in diameter and up to 400 meters deep. The southwestern crater is occupied by a glacier. The main volcanic activity is concentrated in the northwestern part of the massif, where two overlapping craters form a figure-eight shape with a diameter of up to 2 km and a depth of 600 meters.

== Volcanic activity ==
Mutnovsky is considered one of the active volcanoes in Kamchatka. In the 20th century, about 10 eruptions of varying intensity were observed. An eruption in 2000 resulted from underground explosions of hot gas, creating a crater 200 meters in diameter. Its latest eruption took place on 1 July 2026, according to KVERT, creating an ash explosion up to 3.5 km above sea level. The previous eruption at Mutnovsky occurred on 3 July 2013.

The Active Funnel, located in the western crater, contains a large fumarole field. It emits a column of steam and gas emissions, sometimes rising to a height of one kilometer. The temperature of the fumaroles can reach 500°C.

== Geothermal features ==
The volcano exhibits diverse geothermal activity:

- Fumaroles: Cracks emitting volcanic gases, with temperatures recorded up to 540°C in 1983.
- Mud pots: Boiling mud pools of various colors, including the "Black Cauldron" with highly acidic water.
- Ice caves: Formed by the interaction of volcanic heat and glaciers on the volcano's slopes.
- Vulkannaya River: Originates from melting glaciers and snow fields, carrying dissolved minerals and acids. It forms a canyon called Opasny (Dangerous), with an 80-meter waterfall.

== Access and research ==
The volcano's proximity to Petropavlovsk-Kamchatsky facilitates scientific study. Access to the crater area is possible via off-road vehicles, with the journey taking several hours from the Opasny canyon area.

At the northern foot of Mutnovsky volcano are the Dachny thermal springs, also referred to as the Lesser Valley of Geysers. This area features hot springs, boiling mud pots, and occasional geyser-like activity.

== Geothermal power ==
The Mutnovsky Geothermal Power Plant operates near the volcano's northeastern part, harnessing geothermal energy. Its capacity is approximately 60 MW, contributing significantly to the region's power supply.

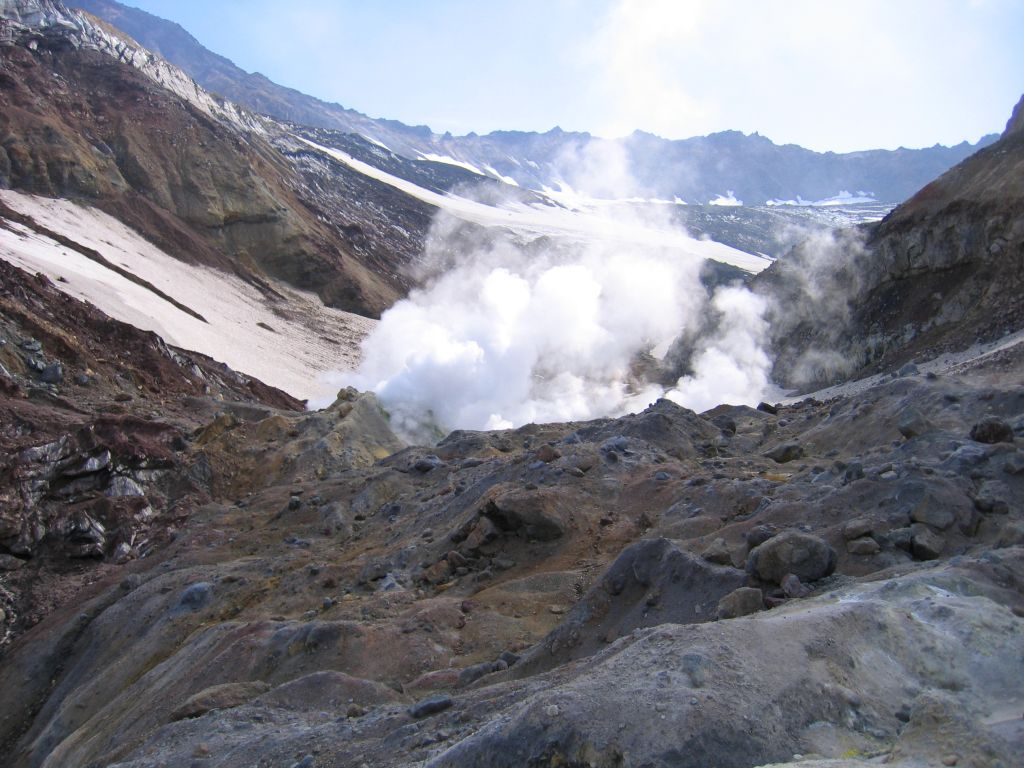
Crater

== See also ==
- List of volcanoes in Russia
- List of ultra prominent peaks in Northeast Asia
- Geothermal power in Russia

== Sources ==
- "Mutnovsky". Global Volcanism Program. Smithsonian Institution.
- "Mutnovsky V., Russia". Peakbagger.com.
