= Europium pentaphosphate =

Names
- Other names Europium ultraphosphate

Identifiers
CAS Number	12530-33-5

Properties
Chemical formula	EuP_{5}O_{14}
Molar mass	530.82 g/mol
Appearance	Solid

Structure
Crystal structure	Monoclinic
Space group	P2_{1}/c, No. 14
- Except where otherwise noted, data are given for materials in their standard state (at 25 °C [77 °F], 100 kPa). Infobox references

Europium pentaphosphate, also known as europium ultraphosphate, is an inorganic compound of europium and phosphate with the chemical formula EuP_{5}O_{14}. It emits red light under X-ray excitation.

== Structure and properties ==
Europium pentaphosphate crystallizes in the monoclinic crystal system in space group P2_{1}/c.

Polarized absorption and fluorescence spectra have been measured between 77 and 583 K. Changes in the ^{7}F_{0}→^{5}D_{2} absorption spectrum at elevated temperature have been attributed to a structural phase transition.

== Preparation ==
Europium pentaphosphate can be prepared by heating europium(III) oxide with concentrated phosphoric acid in a platinum crucible at approximately 600–800 °C.
