= Palmierite =

Rare sulfate mineral

General
- Category: Minerals
- Formula: K_{2}Pb(SO_{4})_{2}

Palmierite, K_{2}Pb(SO_{4})_{2}, is a rare sulfate mineral. It has been found in areas of volcanic activity.
