= Thénardite =

Anhydrous sodium sulfate mineral

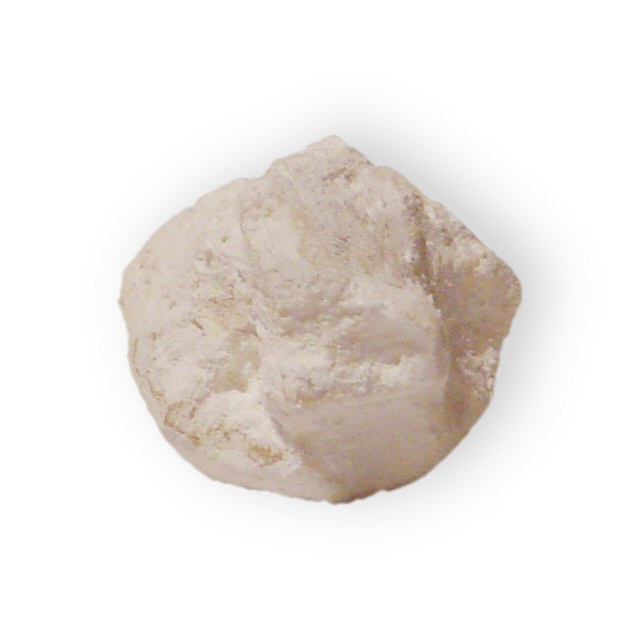
- Thénardite from Sodaville, Nevada

General
- Category: Sulfate mineral
- Formula: Na_{2}SO_{4}
- IMA symbol: Thn
- Strunz classification: 7.AC.25
- Crystal system: Orthorhombic
- Crystal class: Dipyramidal (mmm); H-M symbol: (2/m 2/m 2/m)
- Space group: Fddd
- Unit cell: a = 5.86 Å, b = 12.3 Å c = 9.82 Å; Z = 8

Identification
- Formula mass: 142.04 g/mol
- Color: White, grayish white, yellowish white, reddish white, brownish white
- Crystal habit: Forms crust-like prismatic aggregates on matrix
- Twinning: Interpenetration twinning on {001}; also on {100}; common on {110}; {011}
- Cleavage: {010} perfect, {101} fair, {100} incomplete
- Fracture: Splintery, uneven, hackly
- Tenacity: Brittle
- Mohs scale hardness: 2.5
- Luster: Vitreous to resinous
- Streak: White
- Diaphaneity: Transparent
- Specific gravity: 2.67–2.7, average = 2.68
- Optical properties: Biaxial (+)
- Refractive index: n_{α} = 1.471, n_{β} = 1.477, n_{γ} = 1.484
- Birefringence: δ = 0.013
- Pleochroism: none
- 2V angle: 83°
- Ultraviolet fluorescence: Fluorescent and phosphorescent: short UV=bright white, long UV=yellow-green
- Solubility: Soluble in water
- Other characteristics: Salty taste

Thénardite is an anhydrous sodium sulfate mineral, Na_{2}SO_{4} which occurs in arid evaporite environments, specifically lakes and playas. It also occurs in dry caves and old mine workings as an efflorescence and as a crusty sublimate deposit around fumaroles. It occurs in volcanic caves on Mount Etna, Italy. It was first described in 1825 for an occurrence in the Espartinas Saltworks in Ciempozuelos, Spain, by the Spanish chemist José Luis Casaseca (1800 - 1869). Casaseca named the mineral after his master, the French chemist Louis Jacques Thénard (1777–1857).

Thénardite crystallizes in the orthorhombic system and often forms yellowish, reddish to gray white prismatic crystals although usually in massive crust deposits. Thénardite is fluorescent, white in shortwave and yellow-green in longwave UV radiation.

In humid conditions, thénardite progressively absorbs water and converts to the deca-hydrated mineral mirabilite, Na_{2}SO_{4} · 10 H_{2}O.

== Gallery ==
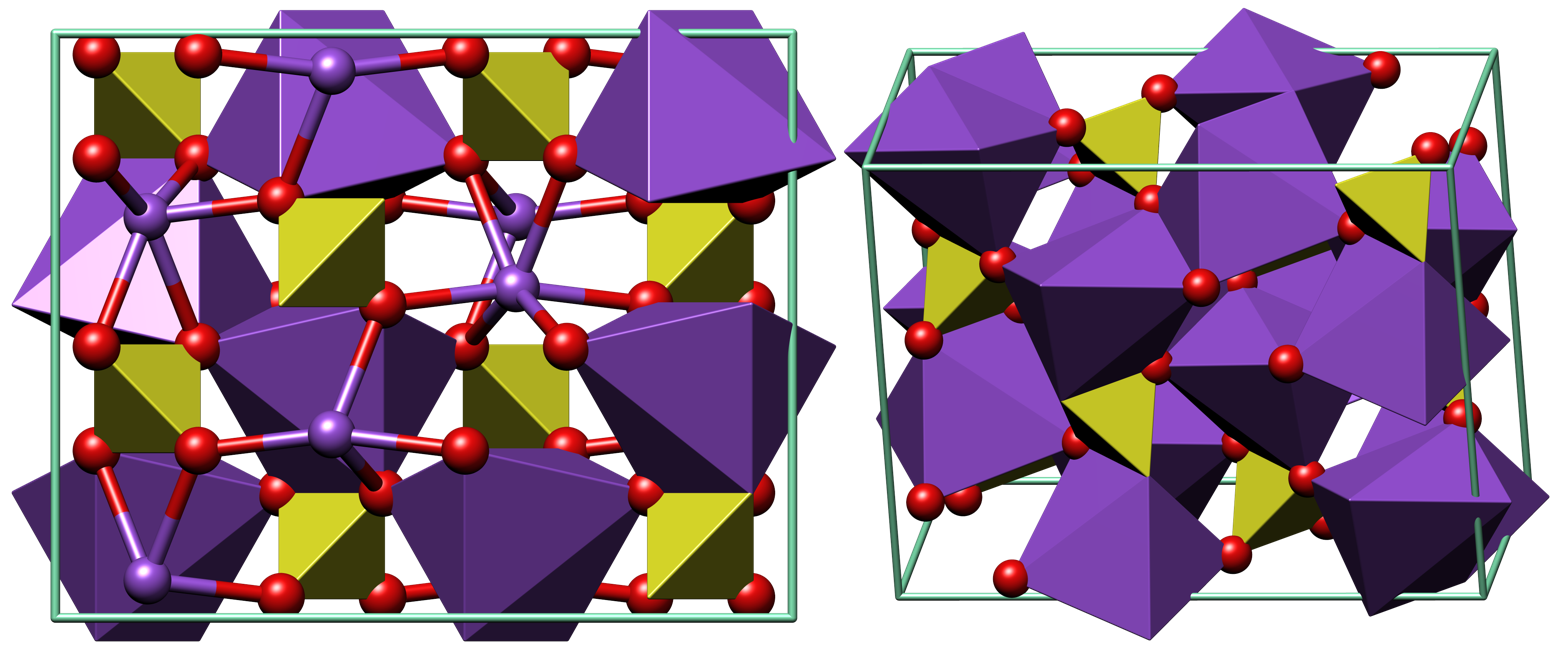
Crystal structure of thénardite

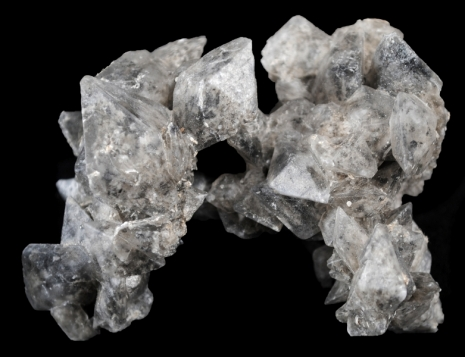
Thénardite, cluster of transparent crystals from Soda Lake, California. Width of cluser is 9 cm (3.5 in).

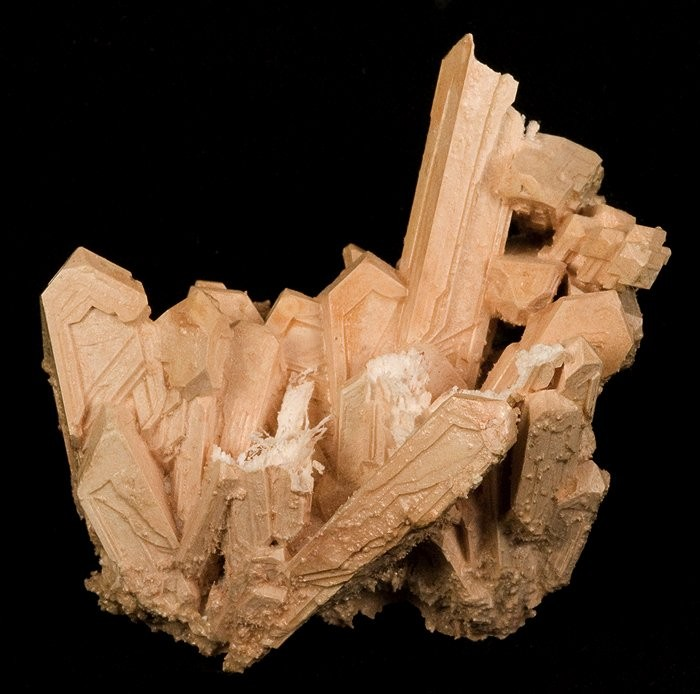
Tan thénardite pseudomorphing mirabilite crystals from the Boron, California area. Cluster is 6 × 5.5 cm.

== Bibliography ==
- Palache, P.; Berman H.; Frondel, C. (1960). "Dana's System of Mineralogy, Volume II: Halides, Nitrates, Borates, Carbonates, Sulfates, Phosphates, Arsenates, Tungstates, Molybdates, Etc. (Seventh Edition)" John Wiley and Sons, Inc., New York, pp. 404-407.
