= Tenorite =

Copper oxide mineral

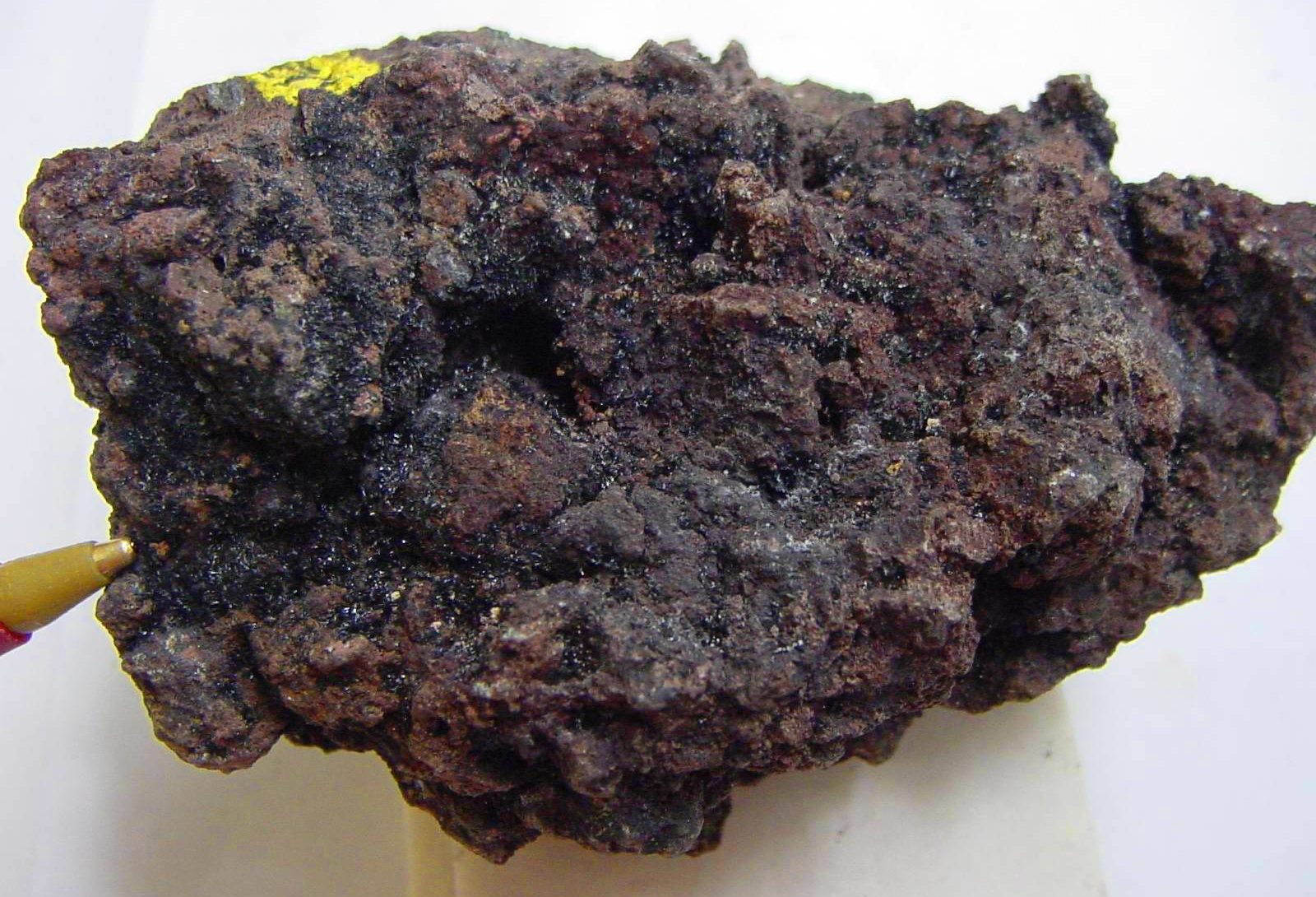

General
- Category: Oxide mineral
- Formula: CuO
- IMA symbol: Tnr
- Strunz classification: 4.AB.10
- Crystal system: Monoclinic
- Crystal class: Prismatic (2/m) (same H-M symbol)
- Space group: C2/c
- Unit cell: a = 4.6837(5) Å b = 3.4226(5) Å c = 5.1288(6) Å; β = 99.47°; Z = 4

Identification
- Color: Steel-gray, iron-gray, black
- Crystal habit: Lathlike crystals, curved, scaly, dendritic; commonly pulverulent, earthy, massive
- Twinning: Common on {011}, forming stellate groups; lamellar
- Cleavage: Poor to indistinct
- Fracture: Conchoidal to uneven
- Tenacity: Brittle; flexible and elastic in thin scales
- Mohs scale hardness: 3.5–4
- Luster: Metallic to earthy
- Streak: Black
- Diaphaneity: Opaque, thin flakes transparent
- Specific gravity: 6.5
- Optical properties: Biaxial (+)
- Pleochroism: Distinct; light to dark brown

Tenorite, sometimes also called Black Copper, is a copper oxide mineral with the chemical formula CuO. The chemical name is Copper(II) oxide or cupric oxide.

== Occurrence ==
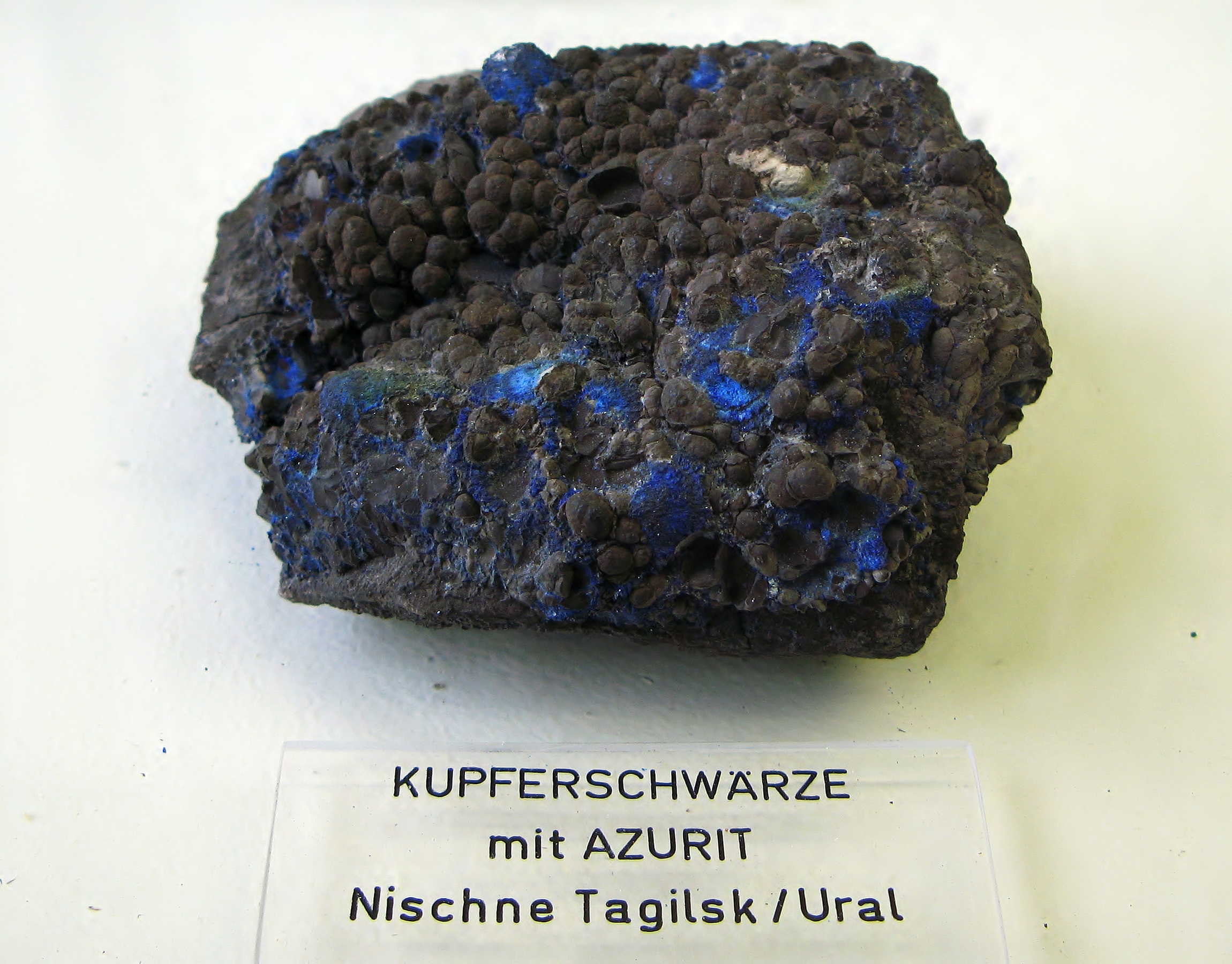
Tenorite with azurite from Nischne Tagilsk, Urals, Russia

Tenorite occurs in the weathered or oxidized zone associated with deeper primary copper sulfide orebodies. Tenorite commonly occurs with chrysocolla and the copper carbonates, azurite and malachite. The dull grey-black color of tenorite contrasts sharply with the often intergrown blue chrysocolla. Cuprite, native copper and Fe–Mn oxides also occur in this environment.

In addition to the hydrothermal, tenorite also occurs as a volcanic sublimate from Vesuvius, Campania, and Etna, Sicily, Italy. As a sublimate it occurs with copper chlorides, alkali chlorides and cotunnite. The Vesuvian sublimate occurrence was originally named melaconise or melaconite by F. S. Beudant in 1832.

Tenorite was named in 1841 after the Italian botanist Michele Tenore (1780–1861).

== See also ==
- Cuprite Cu_{2}O
- List of minerals
- List of minerals named after people
