= Fumarole mineral =

Minerals which are deposited by fumarole exhalations

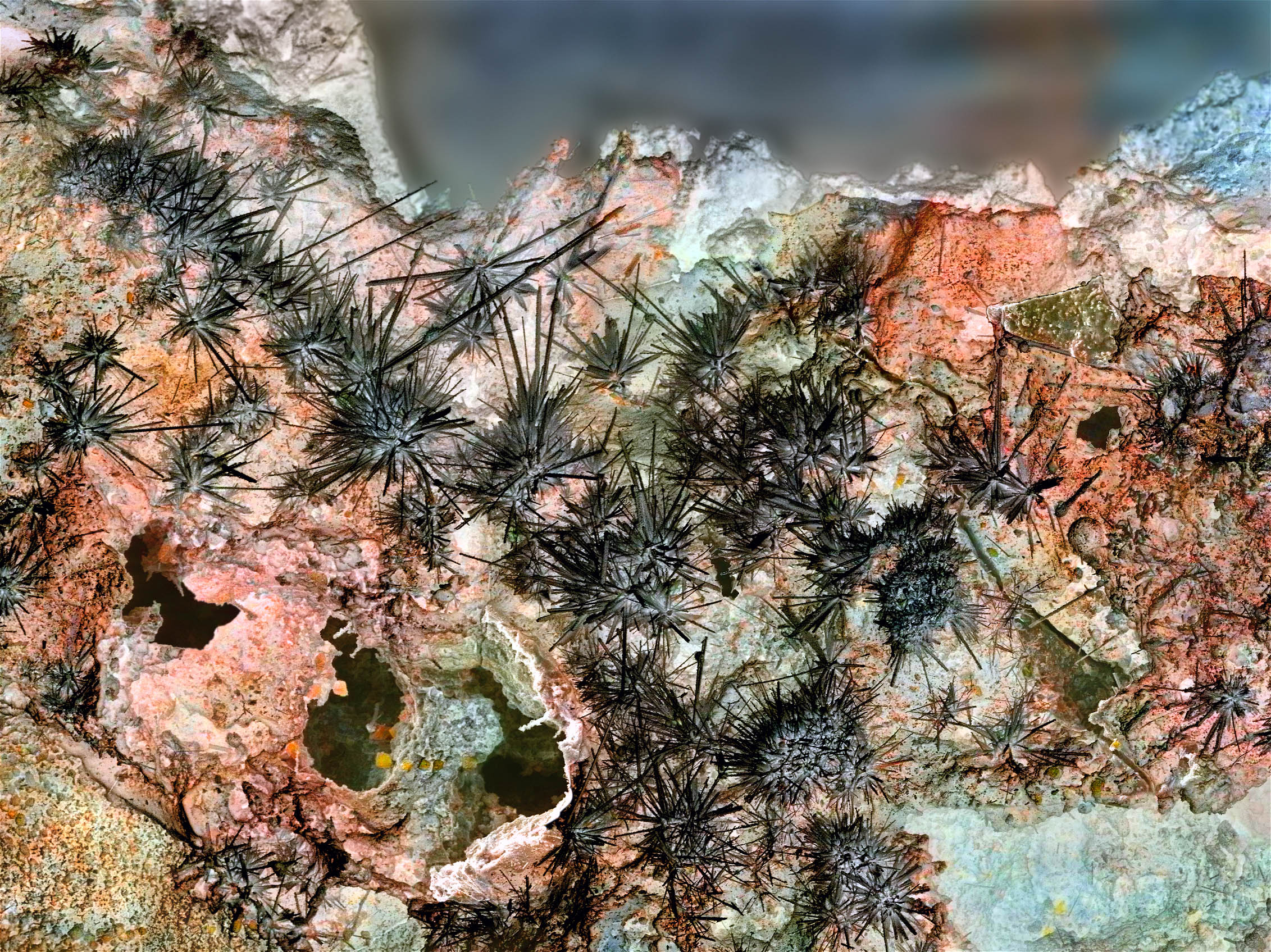
Fumarole formation of tazieffite acicular crystals (black) at Mutnovsky, Kamchatka. An electron micrograph, colour enhanced by optical microscopy, depicted width: 700 microns.

Fumarole minerals (or fumarolic minerals) are minerals which are deposited by fumarole exhalations. They form when gases and compounds desublimate or precipitate out of condensates, forming mineral deposits. They are mostly associated with volcanoes (as volcanic sublimate or fumarolic sublimate) following deposition from volcanic gas during an eruption or discharge from a volcanic vent or fumarole, but have been encountered on burning coal deposits as well. They can be black or multicoloured and are often unstable upon exposure to the atmosphere.

Native sulfur, in this context called brimstone, is a common sublimate mineral and various halides, sulfides and sulfates occur in this environment associated with fumaroles and eruptions. A number of rare minerals are fumarole minerals, and at least 240 such minerals are known from Tolbachik volcano in Kamchatka, Russia. Other volcanoes where particular fumarole minerals have been discovered are Vulcano in Italy and Bezymyanny also in Russia.

== Origin and appearance ==
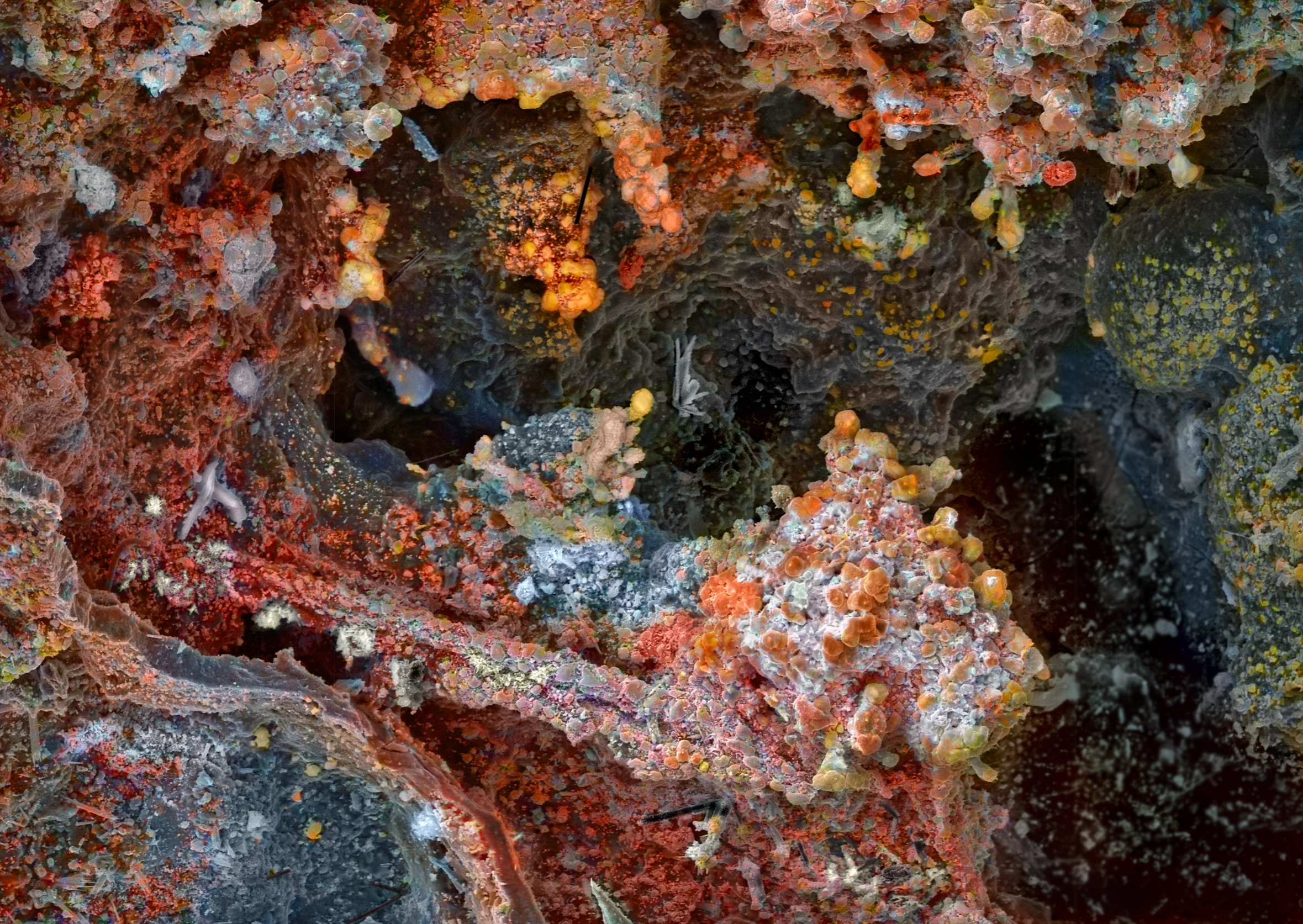
Fumarole minerals in SEM images, from Mutnovsky volcano in Kamchatka. An electron micrograph, colour enhanced by optical microscopy, depicted width: 700 microns.

In fumaroles, minerals either form through desublimation from fumarole gases or through interactions of fumarole gases with country rock. The former are known as sublimates and the latter as incrustations. Some such deposits may also form through the interaction between liquid fumarole condensates and country rock and are not always formed by desublimation. Repeated cycles of primary deposition and secondary alteration may occur. Volcanic gases such as hydrogen chloride, hydrogen fluoride, sulfur dioxide and water can transport large amounts of elements, thus contributing to geochemical cycles on the surface and the formation of ore deposits at depth. When these exhalations reach the atmosphere and cool, the minerals contained in them tend to precipitate out.

Volcanic fumarole minerals (as volcanic sublimate or fumarolic sublimate) form following deposition from volcanic gas during an eruption or discharge from a volcanic vent or fumarole. Burning coal produces enough heat to partially melt rocks and to generate exhalations of the mineral components embedded in coal. Coal seam fires often deposit fumarolic minerals over areas of a few square metres which can be detected by airborne hyperspectral imagery. Coal fires can mobilize toxic trace elements. Fumarole minerals have also been found in Gusev crater on Mars and possibly in a sample returned from the Moon by the probe Chang'e-5.

Fumarole deposits have been used to identify heat flow anomalies and to reconstruct ore genesis processes.

Fumarole exhalations are often black or multicoloured, and tend to develop typical zonations. Common components are sulfur compounds and elemental sulfur. In the Valley of Ten Thousand Smokes in Alaska the fumarole minerals form both thin crusts in the vents, mixtures with tephra deposits and coloured outcrops and mounds at the sites of former fumaroles. Deposits at Tolbachik volcano have shapes likef crusts, small plates and globules.

Typical components of fumarole minerals are halides, oxides, sulfates and sulfides, with the exact composition different between volcanoes, individual vents at volcanoes, different temperatures of the same vent and the history of the vent (new minerals can form when fumarolic gases re-interact with fumarolic minerals left by earlier activity). Fumarolic minerals are often unstable and are eroded or decompose; in the Valley of Ten Thousand Smokes in Alaska it took less than a century for almost all fumarole mineral deposits to disappear although others remained and were later used to identify former fumarole vents. Thus, many fumarole minerals are rare and many rare minerals are fumarole minerals. Some fumarolic minerals have been found in extinct Cenozoic volcanoes and could exist in Archean rocks as well, however. Unique textures occur such as bubble-like structures, which may form when the liquid that deposits the minerals evaporates.

== Volcanoes ==
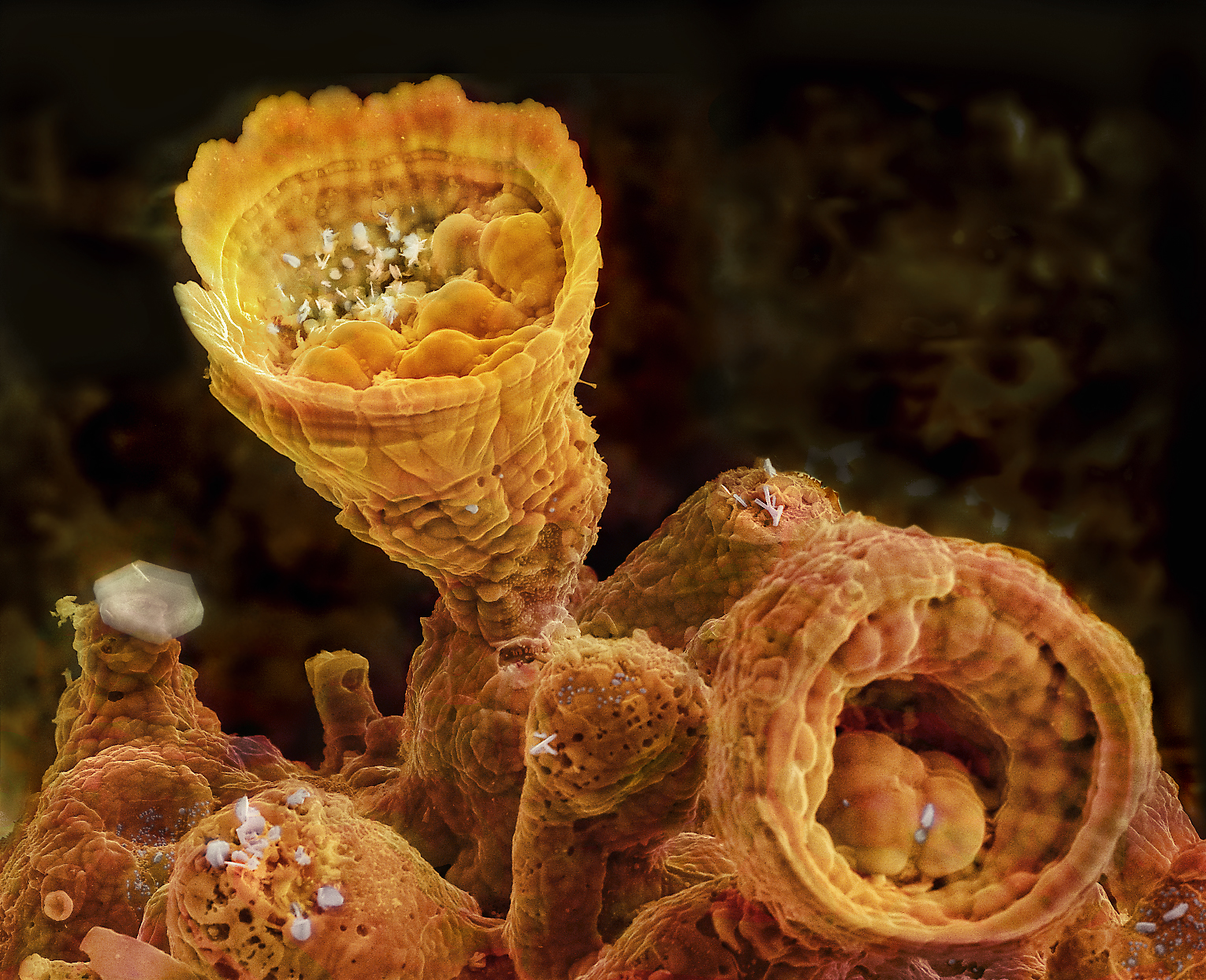
Electron micrograph images of fumarolic minerals at Mutnovsky volcano, Kamchatka

Research on the mineralogy of fumarole minerals has been conducted in Central America, Russia and Europe, with detailed publications on Izalco in El Salvador, Eldfell in Iceland, Vesuvius where research goes back to the early 19th century and Vulcano in Italy, Mount Usu in Japan, [[[Kudryavy]] and Tolbachik in Russia, Kilauea and Mount St. Helens in the United States. Sulfur deposits containing fumarolic desublimates are found at Guallatiri and Lastarria volcanoes in the Central Volcanic Zone of the Andes. Kudryavy volcano in the Kurils is particularly known for the numerous mineralizations its fumaroles have produced and for the presence of rhenium-rich precipitates. Among the elements found there are copper-gold-silver alloys. Avachinsky has been studied for its fumarole deposits since the 1930s. Various sulfate-based minerals have been identified at the Salton Buttes in California. Fumarolic minerals have also been reported from the Western Andes in Bolivia.

The most fumarolic minerals have been found at Tolbachik volcano in Kamchatka, Russia; Tolbachik also has one of the most diverse mineral assemblages in the world, with a number of "endemic" minerals. The high temperature and oxidizing regime of exhalations which transport the elements at Tolbachik facilitates mineral deposition. A large assemblage of silicates and a number of copper-zinc selenite chlorides and copper-based fumarolic minerals were discovered at Tolbachik. Many of these include polymeric CuO_{4} units. About 240 minerals have been identified at Tolbachik, close to a record, 40 of them only incompletely studied. Elemental gold linked to chlorides at Tolbachik has been interpreted as gold transported by chlorine-rich oxidizing environments. Specimens of fumarole minerals from Tolbachik and Kudryavy are hosted by the Fersman Mineralogical Museum in Moscow.

Historical lava flows of Vesuvius volcano contain fumarolic minerals; this volcano has one of the most diverse fumarolic mineral assemblages in Europe, the most important mineral is kaliochalcite. They are predominantly sulfates and copper- or ore-containing minerals. Various fumarole minerals have been discovered at Vulcano volcano in Italy, where the mineralogy has changed since 1987 and 1990 due to hotter fumarole exhalations, yielding increased sulfate and sulfur salt concentrations. Fumarolic minerals have also been encountered in multiple mud volcanoes in Siberia.

== Minerals discovered in fumarole areas ==
Mineral	Formula	Location	Date described	Ref
Abramovite	Pb_{2}SnInBiS_{7}	Kudryavy, Russia	2008	
Allochalcoselite	Cu^{+}Cu^{2+}_{5}PbO_{2}(SeO_{3})_{2}Cl_{5}			
Aluminocoquimbite	AlFe(SO_{4})^{*}_{3}H_{2}O	Grotta del' Alume, Vulcano, Italy	2010	
Aluminopyracmonite	(NH_{4})_{3}Al(SO_{4})_{3}	La Fossa, Vulcano, Italy	2018	
Arsmirandite	Na_{18}Cu^{2+}_{12}Fe^{3+}O_{8}(AsO_{4})_{8}Cl_{5}	Arsenatnaya fumarole, Tolbachik, Russia	2020	
Axelite	Na_{14}Cu_{7}(AsO_{4})_{8}F_{2}Cl_{2}	Arsenatnaya fumarole, Tolbachik, Russia	2022	
Baliczunicite	Bi_{2}O(SO_{4})_{2}	La Fossa, Vulcano, Italy	2013	
Belomarinaite	KNaSO_{4}	Toludskoe lava field, Tolbachik, Russia	2019	
Belousovite	KZn(SO_{4})Cl	Yadovitaya fumarole, Second Scoria Cone, Tolbachik, Russia	2018	
Blossite	α‑Cu^{2+}_{2}V^{5+}_{2}O_{7}	Izalco, El Salvador	1987	
Bubnovaite	K_{2}Na_{8}Ca(SO_{4})_{6}	Naboko cone, Tolbachik, Russia		
Burnsite	KCdCu_{7}O_{2}(SeO_{3})_{2}Cl_{9}	Tolbachik	2002?	
Cadmoindite	CdIn_{2}S_{4}	Kudryavy, Russia	2004	
Calciolangbeinite	K_{2}Ca_{2}(SO_{4})_{3}	Arsenatnaya fumarole, Tolbachik, Russia	2022	
Campostriniite	(Bi^{3+}_{,}Na)_{3}(NH^{,}_{4}K)_{2}Na_{2}(SO_{4})^{·}_{6}H_{2}O	La Fossa, Vulcano, Italy	2015	
Cannizzarite	Pb_{46}Bi_{54}(S_{,}Se)_{127}	La Fossa, Vulcano, Italy		
Cesiodymite	CsKCu_{5}O(SO_{4})_{5}	Second Scoria Cone, Tolbachik, Russia	2018	
Chubarovite	KZn_{2}(BO_{3})Cl_{2}	Arsenatnaya fumarole, Tolbachik, Russia	2015	
Cryptochalcite	K_{2}Cu_{5}O(SO_{4})_{5}	Second Scoria Cone, Tolbachik, Russia	2018	
Cuprodobrovolskyite	Na_{4}Cu(SO_{4})_{3}	Second Scoria Cone, Tolbachik	2023	
Cupromolybdite	Cu_{3}O(MoO_{4})_{2}	New Tolbachik scoria cones, Tolbachik, Russia	2012	
D'ansite	Na_{21}Mn^{2+}(SO_{4})_{10}Cl	Vesuvius and Vulcano, Italy	2012	
Demartinite	K_{2}SiF_{6}	La Fossa, Vulcano, Italy	2007	
Demicheleite	BiSI and BiSBr	La Fossa, Vulcano, Italy	2010 and 2008	
Dobrovolskyite	Na_{4}Ca(SO_{4})_{3}	Great Tolbachik fissure eruption, Kamchatka peninsula, Russia	2021	
Elasmochloite	Na_{3}Cu_{6}BiO_{4}(SO_{4})			
Eldfellite	NaFe(SO_{4})_{2}			
Ermakovite	(NH_{4})(As_{2}O_{3})_{2}Br	Fan-Yagnob coal deposit, Tajikistan	2022	
Grigorievite	Cu_{3}Fe^{3+}_{2}Al_{2}(VO_{4})	Second Scoria Cone, Tolbachik, Russia	2015	
Heimaeyite	Na_{3}Al(SO_{4})_{3}	Eldfell, Iceland	2025	
Hermannjahnite	CuZn(SO_{4})_{2}	Naboko scoria cone, Tolbachik, Russia	2018	
Kantorite	K_{2}NaMg(SO_{4})_{2}F	Arsenatnaya fumarole, Tolbachik, Russia	2025	
Karpovite	Tl_{2}VO(SO_{4})_{2}(H_{2}O)	First Cinder Cone, Tolbachik, Russia	2018	
Knasibfite	K_{3}Na_{4}[SiF_{6}]_{3}[BF_{4}]	La Fossa, Vulcano, Italy	2008	
Koksharovite	CaMg_{2}Fe^{3+}_{4}(VO_{4})_{6}	Bezymyanny, Russia	2015	
Kristjánite	KNa_{2}H(SO_{4})_{2}	Fimmvörðuháls, Iceland	2010	
Kudriavite	(Cd_{,}Pb)Bi_{2}S_{4}	Kudryavy, Russia	2004	
Lehmannite	Na_{18}Cu^{2+}_{12}TiO_{8}(AsO_{4})_{8}FCl_{5}	Arsenatnaya fumarole, Tolbachik	2020	
Leonardsenite	MgAlF_{5}(H_{2}O)_{2}	Eldfell, Heimaey, Iceland	2015	
Lesyukite	Al_{2}(OH)_{5}Cl^{20−}_{*}H_{2}O	First Cone, Tolbachik, Russia	2007 or earlier	
Lucabindiite	(K_{,}NH_{4})As_{4}O_{6}(Cl_{,}Br)	La Fossa, Vulcano, Italy	2010–2011	
Majzlanite	K_{2}Na(ZnNa)Ca(SO_{4})_{4}	Yadovitaya fumarole, Tolbachik, Russia	2019	
Manuelarossiite	CaPbAlF_{7}	Vesuvius volcano, Italy	2024?	
Medvedevite	KMnV_{2}O_{6}Cl_{*}(H_{2}O)_{2}	Toludskoe lava field, Tolbachik, Russia	2020	
Napoliite	Pb_{2}OFCl	Vesuvius, 1994 rocks	2010-2020	
Natromolybdite	Na_{2}MoO^{·}_{4}H_{2}O	Arsenatnaya fumarole, Tolbachik, Russia	2025	
Nishanbaevite	KAl_{2}O(AsO_{4})(SO_{4})	Arsenatnaya fumarole, Tolbachik, Russia	2022	
Oskarssonite	AlF_{3}	Eldfell, Iceland	2018	
Ozerovaite	Na_{2}KAl_{3}(AsO_{4})_{4}	Second Cinder Cone, Tolbachik, Russia	2019	
Paradimorphite	As_{4}S_{3}	Solfatara, Campi Flegrei, Italy	2022	
Parageorgbokiite	^{b-}Cu_{5}O_{2}(SeO_{3})_{2}Cl_{2}	Yadovitaya fumarole, Tolbachik, Russia	2007	
Parascandolaite	KMgF_{3}	Vesuvius, Italy	2014	
Parawulffite	K_{5}Na_{3}Cu_{8}O_{4}(SO_{4})_{8}	Arsenatnaya fumarole, Tolbachik, Russia	2014	
Petrovite	Na_{10}CaCu_{2}(SO_{4})_{8}	Second Scoria Cone, Tolbachik, Russia	2020	
Pliniusite	Ca_{5}(VO_{4})_{3}F	Tolbachik, Russia	2022	
Prewittite	KPb_{1.5}Cu_{6}Zn(SeO_{3})_{2}O_{2}Cl_{10}	Second Scoria Cone, Tolbachik, Russia	2013	
Pseudolyonsite	Cu_{3}(VO_{4})_{2}	New Tolbachik scoria cones, Tolbachik, Russia	2011	
Puninite	Na_{2}Cu_{3}O(SO_{4})_{3}	Second scoria cone, Tolbachik, Russia	2017	
Rhabdoborite	Mg_{12}(V_{,}Mo_{,}W)_{4/3}O_{6}[(BO_{3})_{6–x}(PO_{4})_{x}F_{2–x}]	Arsenatnaya fumarole, Tolbachik, Russia	2020	
Russoite	NH_{4}ClAs^{3+}_{2}O_{3}(H_{2}O)_{0.5}	Solfatara, Phlegrean Fields, Italy	2018	
Ryabchikovite	CuMg(Si_{2}O_{6})	Arsenatnaya, Tolbachik	2023	
Sbacchiite	Ca_{2}AlF_{7}	Vesuvius, Italy	2019	
Shcherbinaite	V_{2}O_{5}	Izalco, El Salvador	1983	
Stoiberite	Cu_{5}V_{2}O_{10}	"Y fumarole", Izalco, El Salvador	1979	
Therasiaite	(NH_{4})_{3}KNa_{2}Fe^{2+}Fe^{3+}(SO_{4})_{3}Cl_{5}	La Fossa, Vulcano, Italy	2014	
Thermessaite	(NH_{4})_{2}AlF_{3}(SO_{4})	La Fossa, Vulcano, Italy	2021	
Topsøeite	FeF_{3}(H_{2}O)_{3}	Hekla, Iceland	2018	
Wulffite	K_{3}NaCu_{4}O_{2}(SO_{4})_{4}	Arsenatnaya fumarole, Tolbachik, Russia	2014	
Vasilseverginite	Cu_{9}O_{4}(AsO_{4})_{2}(SO_{4})_{2}	Arsenatnaya fumarole, Tolbachik, Russia	2021	
Wrightite	K_{2}Al_{2}O(AsO_{4})_{2}	Second Scoria Cone, Tolbachik, Russia	1983	
Yavapaiite	KFe(SO_{4})_{2}			
Ziminaite	Fe^{3+}VO_{4}	Bezymyanny, Russia	2018	
Zincobradaczekite	NaCuCuZn_{2}(AsO_{4})_{3}	Yadovitaya fumarole, Tolbachik, Russia	2020	

== Gallery ==
Scanning electron microscope images of fumarole minerals

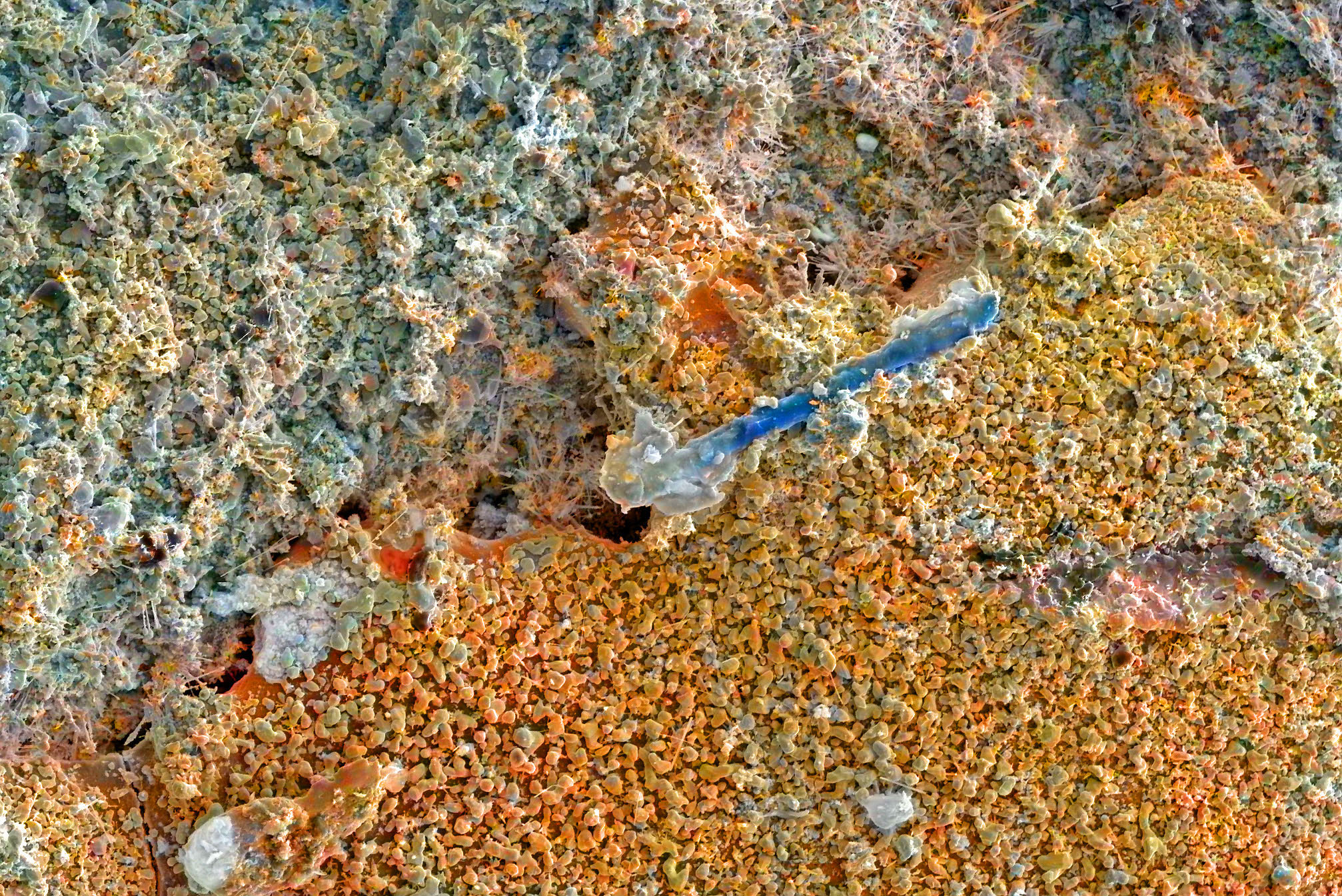
Fumarole minerals in natural colours

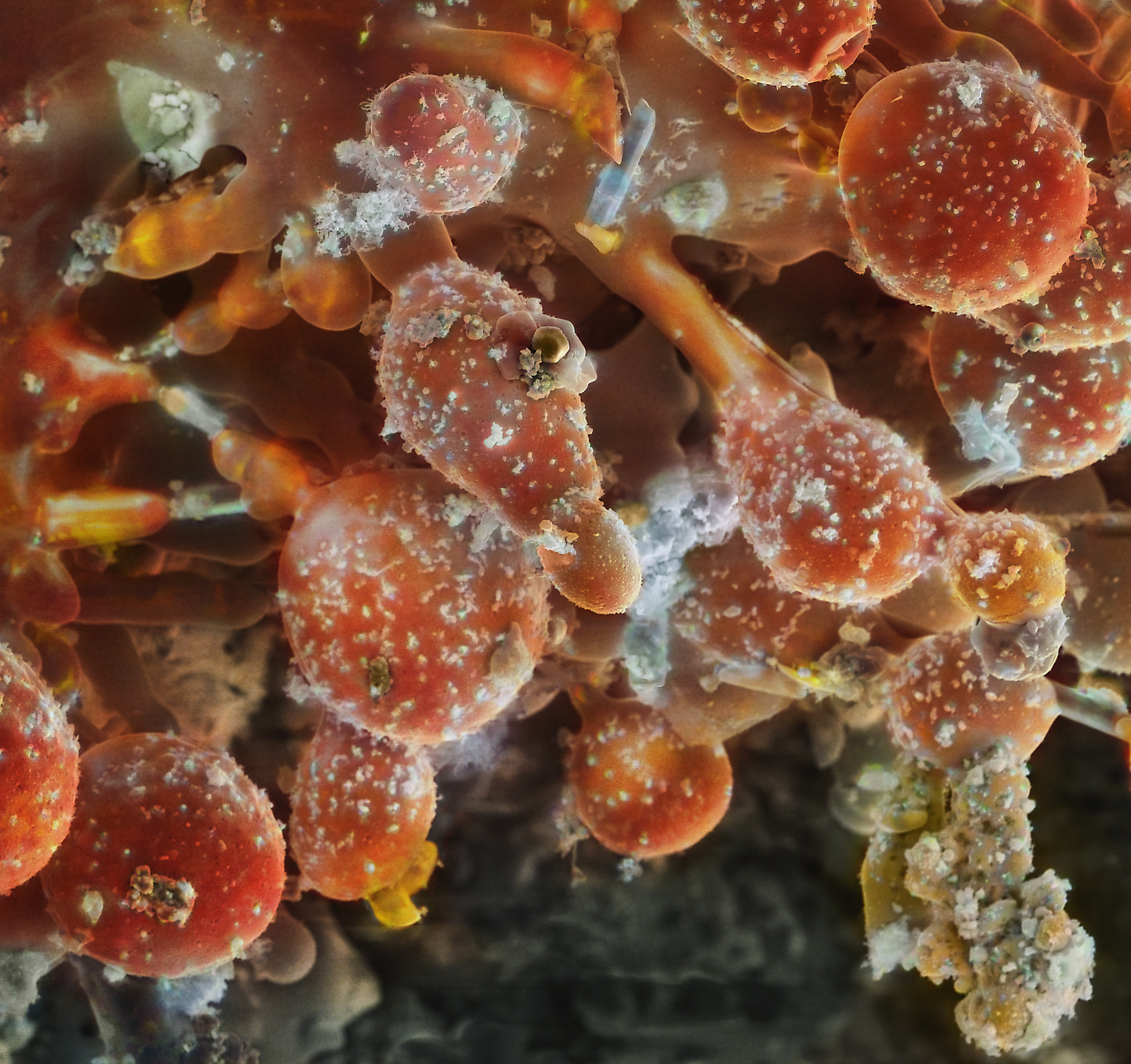
Fumarole minerals in natural colours, Mutnovsky, Kamchatka

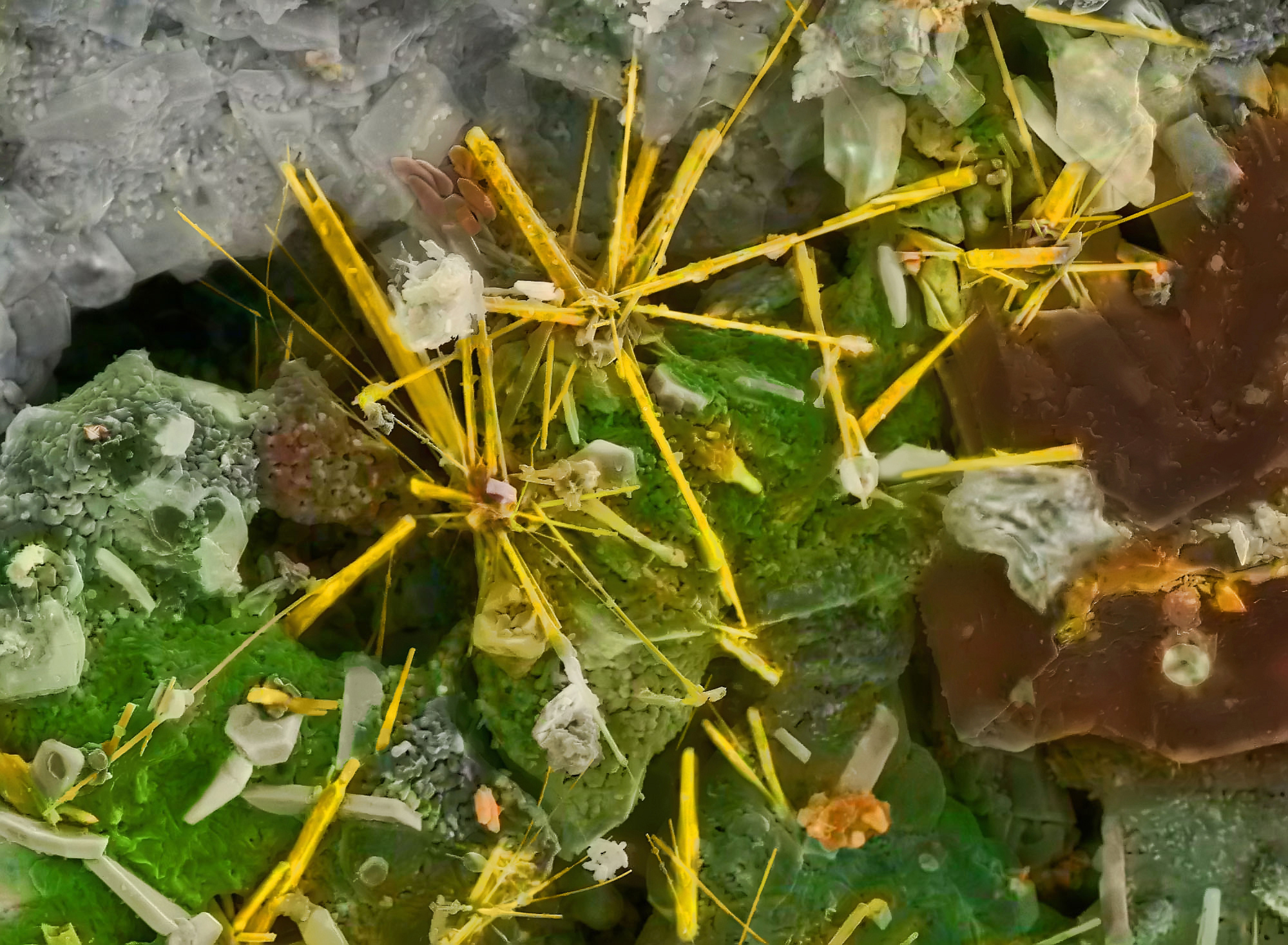
Fumarole minerals in natural colours, Tolbachik, Kamchatka
Photos of fumarole minerals

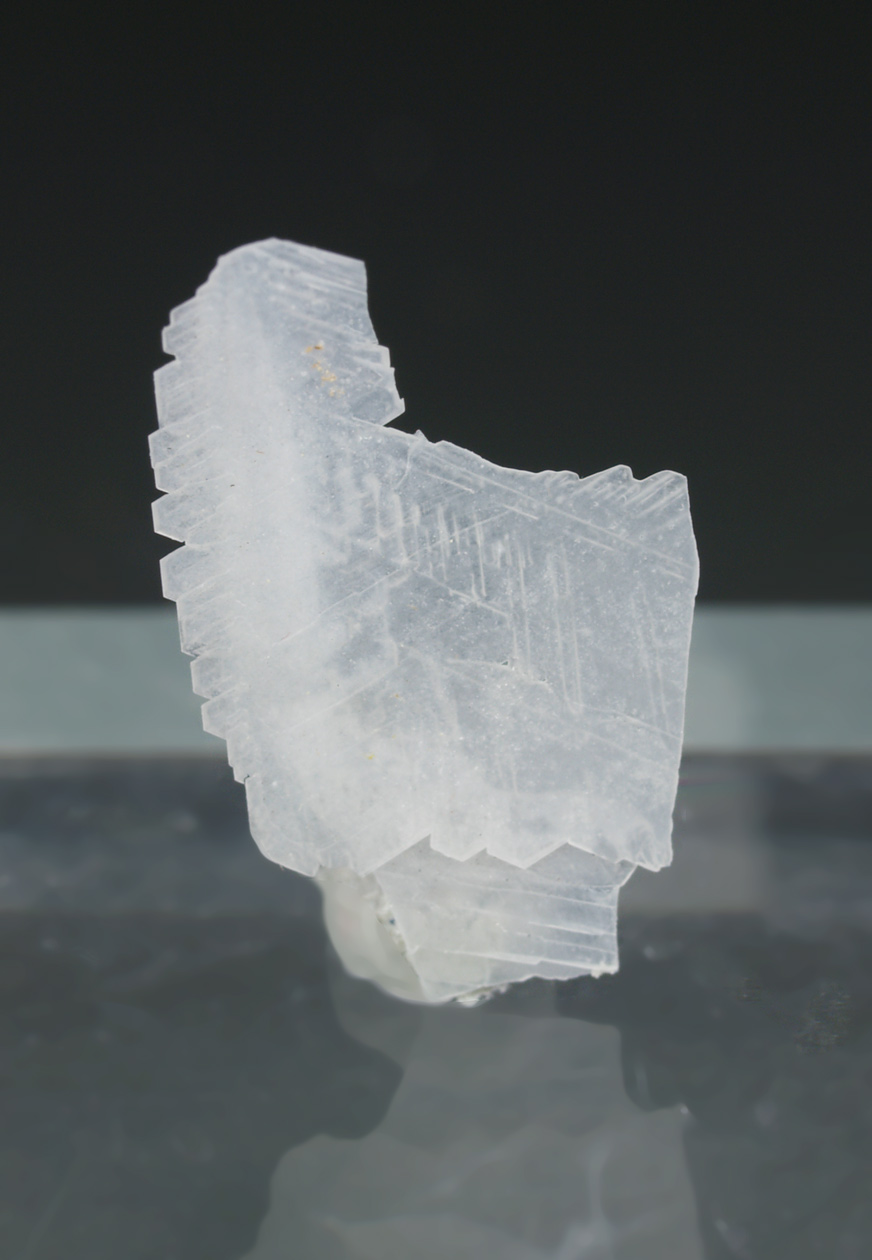
Non-SEM photo of belomarinaite from Tolbachik, Kamchatka
