= Alum-(K) =

Sulfate mineral

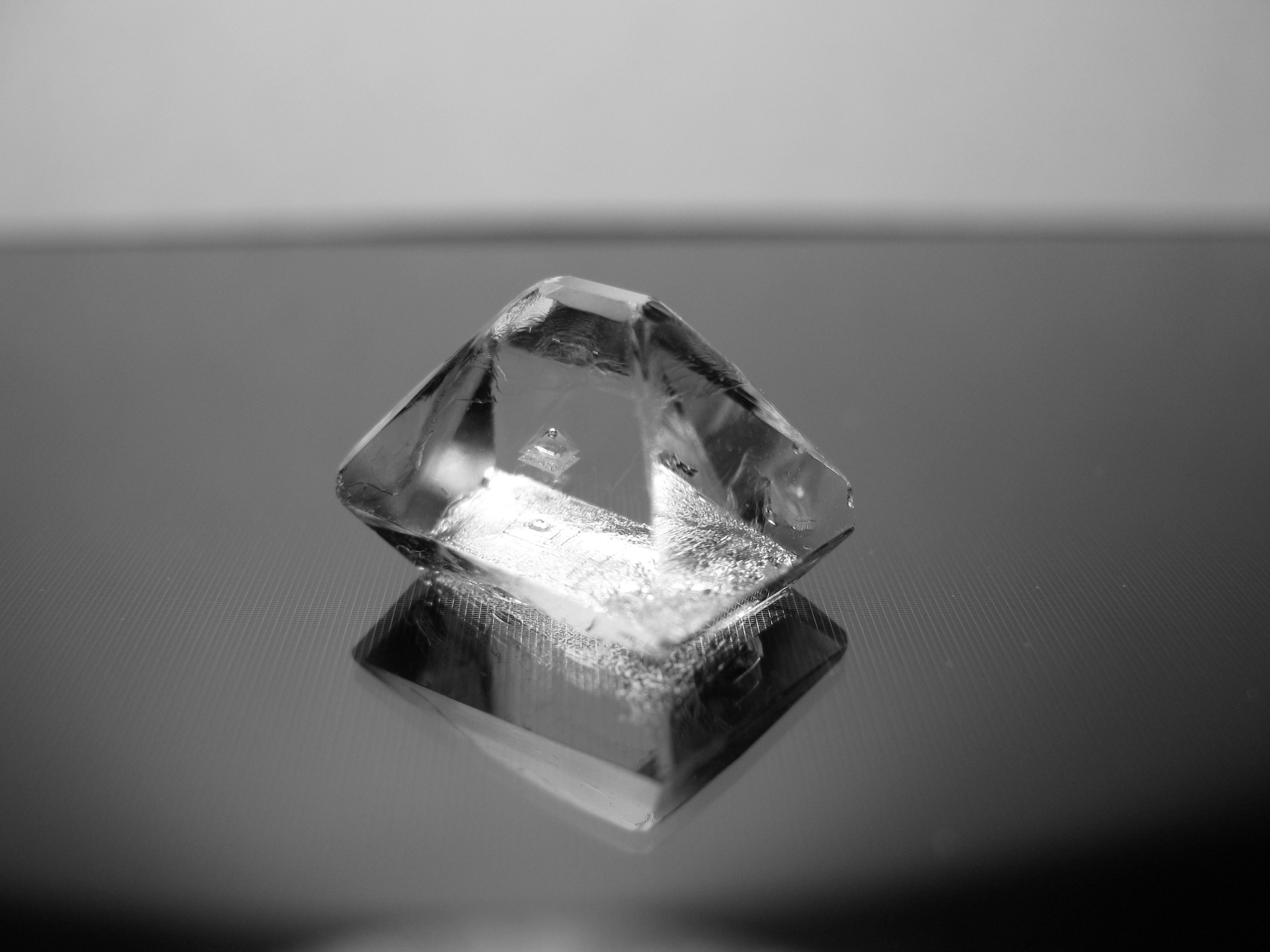
- Octahedral crystal of potassium alum

General
- Category: Sulfate mineral
- Formula: KAl(SO_{4})_{2}·12(H_{2}O)
- IMA symbol: Aum-K
- Strunz classification: 7.CC.20
- Crystal system: Cubic
- Crystal class: Diploidal (m3̅); H-M symbol: (2/m 3̅)
- Space group: Pa3̅
- Unit cell: a = 12.133 Å; Z = 4

Identification
- Color: Colorless, white
- Crystal habit: Stalactitic, columnar, granular, massive efflorescences; rare as small octahedral crystals
- Twinning: Rare on {111}
- Cleavage: On {111} indistinct
- Fracture: Conchoidal
- Mohs scale hardness: 2-2.5
- Luster: Vitreous
- Diaphaneity: Transparent
- Specific gravity: 1.757
- Optical properties: Isotropic
- Refractive index: n=1.453
- Solubility: Water soluble

Alum-(K) is a hydrous potassium aluminium sulfate mineral with formula KAl(SO_{4})_{2}·12(H_{2}O). It is the mineral form of potassium alum and is referred to as potassium alum in older sources. It is a member of the alum group.

It occurs as colorless to white, soft isometric crystals and efflorescence coatings. Rare crystals are octahedral in form if occurring as precipitates from neutral water solution, but cubic in form if the solution is alkaline.

It occurs as a precipitate around volcanic fumaroles and solfataras. It also occurs as an alteration in argillaceous sediments or coal beds which contain oxidizing sulfide minerals (pyrite or marcasite). Occurs associated with alunogen, pickeringite, epsomite, melanterite, gypsum and native sulfur.

Occurrences include Mount Vesuvius, Italy and Alum Cave, Sevier County, Tennessee.
