= Chvaleticeite =

Manganese magnesium sulfate mineral

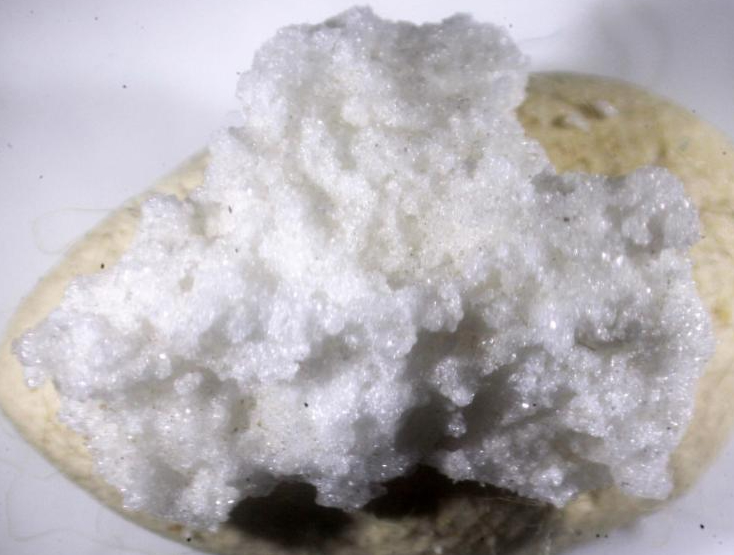

General
- Category: Sulfate mineral
- Formula: (Mn^{2+}, Mg)[SO_{4}]·6(H_{2}O)
- IMA symbol: Cva
- Strunz classification: 7.CB.25
- Dana classification: 29.6.8.6
- Crystal system: Monoclinic
- Crystal class: Prismatic (2/m) (same H-M symbol)
- Space group: C2/c
- Unit cell: a = 10.05 Å, b = 7.24 Å, c = 24.31 Å; β = 98°; Z = 8

Identification
- Color: White, pale pink, yellowish green
- Crystal habit: Efflorescence coatings, minute granular
- Cleavage: Poor
- Mohs scale hardness: 1.5
- Luster: Vitreous
- Streak: White
- Diaphaneity: Translucent to transparent
- Specific gravity: 1.84
- Optical properties: Biaxial
- Refractive index: nα = 1.457 nγ = 1.506
- Birefringence: δ = 0.049
- Solubility: Soluble in water
- Alters to: Dehydrates in air

Chvaleticeite is a monoclinic hexahydrite manganese magnesium sulfate mineral with formula: (Mn^{2+}, Mg)[SO_{4}]·6(H_{2}O). It occurs in the oxidized zone of manganese silicate deposits with pyrite and rhodochrosite that have undergone regional and contact metamorphism. It is defined as the manganese dominant member of the hexahydrite group.

Chvaleticeite is named after the city Chvaletice, Bohemia, in the Czech Republic. Chvaleticeite and minerals like it have been studied for their hydrogen bonding and incongruent melting properties as they are predicted to form in the relative environments of Mars and other bodies in the Solar System.

== Structure ==
The structure in chvaleticeite is made by hydrogen bonding in metallic sulfates. Due to the minute grain size of chvaleticeite, typical single crystal methods could not be used. Through analogy with hexahydrite the Guinier powder diffraction method was used to identify the following structural parameters: space group C 2/c, a = 10.05(2) Å, b = 7.24(2) Å, c = 24.3(1) Å; β = 98.0(2)°, V = 1754 Å^{3}, Z = 8, Dx = 1.84 g·cm^{−3}; a : b : c = 1.3881 : 1 : 3.3564.

== Composition ==
Chvaleticeite has an empirical formula of (Mn^{2+}, Mg)[SO_{4}]·6(H_{2}O) and is a member of the hexahydrite group with the space group C2/c. Chemical analysis was carried out using classical chemical methods. Sulfate was determined gravimetrically, MnO was determined using titration, MgO was determined by EDTA titration and CaO, Fe_{2}O_{3}, K_{2}O and Na_{2}O using AAS. The H_{2}O was determined by the modified Penfield method. The performed analysis produced the following result: MnO 15.81, MgO 6.41, CaO 0.04, FeO traces, Fe_{2}O_{3} 0.10, Al_{2}O_{3} traces, K_{2}O 0.005, Na_{2}O 0.011, SO_{3} 31.48, P_{2}O_{5} traces, H_{2}O+ 0.37, H_{2}O- 45.22, insoluble residue 0.36, sum 99.81 weight percent.

== Occurrence ==
Chvaleticeite was discovered in a sulfate paragenesis in the oxidation zone of the Upper Proterozoic volcanogenic massive sulfide ore deposit of pyrite-manganese ores at Chvaletice. It was found in association with melanterite (it can form by partial dehydration), Mg-jokouite, Mg-ilesite, rozenite, copiapite and gypsum. This paragenesis allows heptahydrates and tetrahydrates to dominate over pentahydrates and hexahydrates. Chvaleticeite is completely soluble in water.
