= Tarnowskie Góry Chemical Plant =

Former chemical plant in Poland

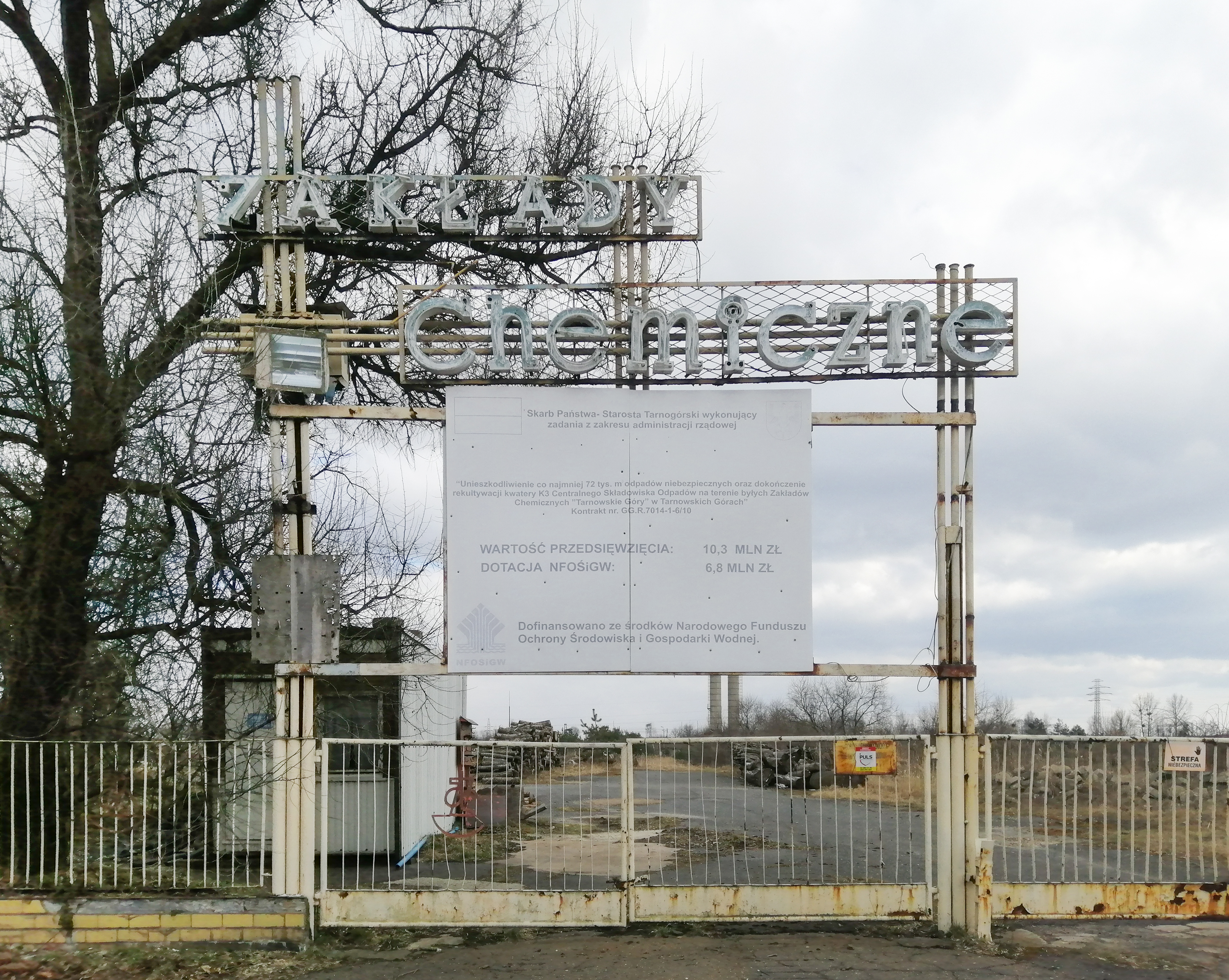
- Gate to the facility (2021)
- Company type: State-owned
- Industry: Chemical
- Founded: 1922
- Defunct: 1995
- Headquarters: 1 Boczna Street, Tarnowskie Góry, Poland

Tarnowskie Góry Chemical Plant was a state-owned enterprise in the chemical industry that operated between 1922 and 1995, established on the site of a former steel and paper mills located between the villages of Sowice and Lasowice in Upper Silesia (now districts of Tarnowskie Góry). It is considered one of the most dangerous and environmentally harmful industrial plants in Poland.

The beginnings of industry in this area date back to the 16th and 17th centuries, when ore mined on a small scale was smelted there and alum and vitriol were produced. In 1842, on the initiative of Count Hugo Henckel von Donnersmarck, the Hugohütte Ironworks was opened there, which operated until 1892. In the meantime, the first cellulose plant in Silesia was also established, producing unbleached cellulose fiber and, from 1892, paper as well. The facility, named Cellulose- und Papierfabrik, also belonged to the Henckel von Donnersmarck family. Between 1893 and 1908, it was expanded several times and remained in operation until 1919.

After World War I, production of inorganic compounds began there, including lithopone, paints and varnishes, aluminium sulfate, sodium dichromate, and later also barium chloride, sodium perborate, zinc sulfate, and borax. In January 1945, the plant came under Polish management as Czarna Huta Chemical Plant, and in 1947 it was officially nationalized. Between 1958 and 1968, the company – now operating under the name Tarnowskie Góry Chemical Plant – was expanded with new production facilities. In subsequent years a new laboratory was commissioned, and the infrastructure and employee amenities were modernized. In the late 1980s, the plant began to decline, and the massive environmental contamination discovered in the following years – linked to the presence of unsecured industrial waste around the facility – resulted in its inclusion on the national list of the largest polluters, the so-called Lista 80 (List of 80). The company was liquidated in 1995, and since then, the site has been undergoing continuous reclamation, along with the removal of waste accumulated in landfills that threaten the Main Groundwater Reservoir 330 – Gliwice and the nearby Stoła river.

== History ==
=== Metallurgy ===
The earliest records of manufacturing activity in the area of the current chemical plant date back to the 16th and 17th centuries, when ores extracted from nearby mines were smelted there. After mining ceased, alum, vitriol, and red paint were produced on a small scale (annual production amounted to approximately 6 tons of alum, 2 tons of vitriol, and 200–300 kg of paint). In 1842, on the initiative of Count Hugo Henckel von Donnersmarck, the Hugohütte Ironworks (Polish: Huta Hugo), commonly known as Czarna Huta, was established on land between Sowice (German: Sowitz) and Lasowice (German: Lassowitz) near Tarnowskie Góry (German: Tarnowitz). Over time, the industrial colony that was developing in the vicinity of the plants also adopted the official name Hugohütte. Production of cast iron castings in cupola furnaces soon began, and in 1852, a coke-fired blast furnace was built. Between 1854 and 1857, the first section of a narrow-gauge railway in Upper Silesia, with a gauge of 785 mm and a length of 110 km, was constructed. It began on the grounds of Hugohütte and led to Wirek, passing through Bobrowniki, Bobrek, and Chebzie, among other places.

=== Cellulose and paper industry ===
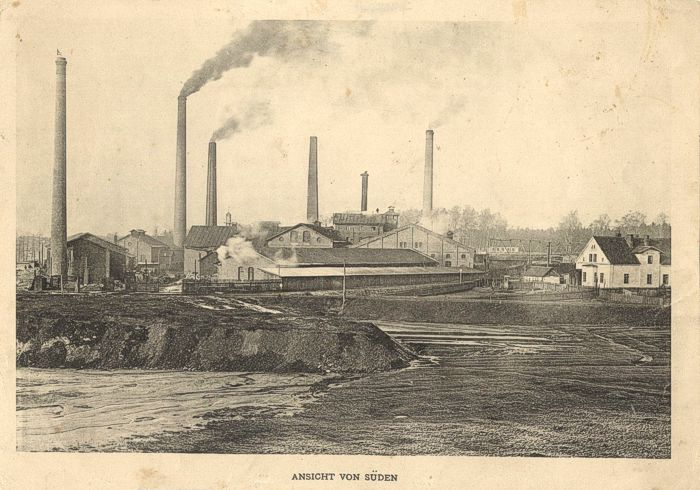
Cellulose and Paper Factory near Tarnowskie Góry, view from the south. Postcard from between 1895 and 1905

After 20 years of operation, the plant's smelting furnaces were gradually shut down. In 1876, the first cellulose plant in Silesia was opened there, designed and built by engineer Rosenhain from Berlin. It produced unbleached cellulose fiber, which was then sold to paper mills at a price of 20 marks per hundredweight. In the early 1880s, the factory's annual production volume was 15,000–18,000 hundredweights (approximately 750–900 tons). Production in Czarna Huta was finally discontinued in 1892. At the same time, due to the increase in the number of cellulose factories, difficulties arose in selling the product. For this reason, the production profile was expanded to include paper manufacturing in the same year, and the plant was transformed into the Cellulose and Paper Factory (German: Cellulose- und Papierfabrik). It was owned by Hugo's sons: Hugo II, Lazarus, and Arthur, as well as Johannes Scheffer-Hoppenhöfer of Sundern, who sold his shares to the Donnersmarcks in 1897. The expansion of the plant proceeded very quickly, and by 1893 there were already 4 paper machines in operation. At the turn of the 19th and 20th centuries there were 5, 6 in 1903, and 7 in 1908. All machines were constructed by Maschinenfabrik AG, formerly Wagner & Co., from Köthen. In 1904, the Donnersmarcks decided to build a more modern paper mill in Krapkowice and transfer part of their production there. The plant near Tarnowskie Góry operated until 1919.

=== Chemical industry ===
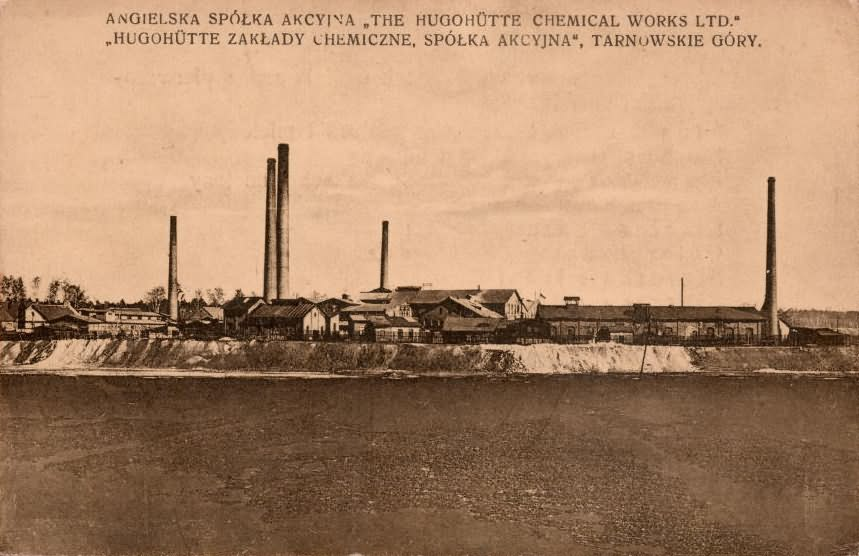
Hugohütte Chemical Works, Joint-Stock Company. Early 1920s

After World War I, part of the former factory was leased to the industrialist Huldczyński of Gliwice, who opened a pipe-bending division there for his Pipe Manufacturing Plant. However, as early as February 1922, the plant was taken over by The Hugohütte Chemical Works Ltd., a company owned by the Donnersmarcks and headquartered in London. Another part was leased to Meitlis and Co., which began producing lithopone, paints, and varnishes between 1924 and 1925, as well as alum once again, along with aluminium sulfate, barium sulfide, sodium dichromate, copper(II) sulfate, and, starting in 1926, barium chloride. When the company went bankrupt in 1928, its shares were purchased by the Donnersmarck Group, whose headquarters were moved to Tarnowskie Góry, while the plant was renamed Henckel Chemical Works Joint-Stock Company. Soon, the manufacturing and auxiliary departments were modernized, and the plant's production was expanded to include barium nitrate, barium sulfate, zinc oxide, and zinc sulfate. In the 1930s, production of additional chemical compounds started: sodium perborate, zinc nitrate, borax, boric acid, and zinc sulfide. Immediately before World War II, the plant employed approximately 400 workers.

During World War II, the plant was initially known as Chemische Werke Henckel GmbH, and on 22 July 1941, by resolution of the shareholders, its name was changed to Chemische Werke Hugohütte GmbH.

From 25 January 1945, the company was named Czarna Huta Chemical Plant and came under Polish administration. During the war, over 50% of the machinery was destroyed as a result of intensive use. It was rebuilt by December 1945. On 1 December 1945, Czarna Huta, along with its chemical plants, was incorporated into Tarnowskie Góry. In February of the following year, production at the plant resumed, a soot department was established, and the production of aluminium sulfate, copper(II) sulfate, and potassium alum was resumed. In 1947, the plant was officially nationalized, and the borate department was also put into operation that year. Thanks to renovations and the intensification of production, its value in 1949 was approximately 60% higher than in 1938.

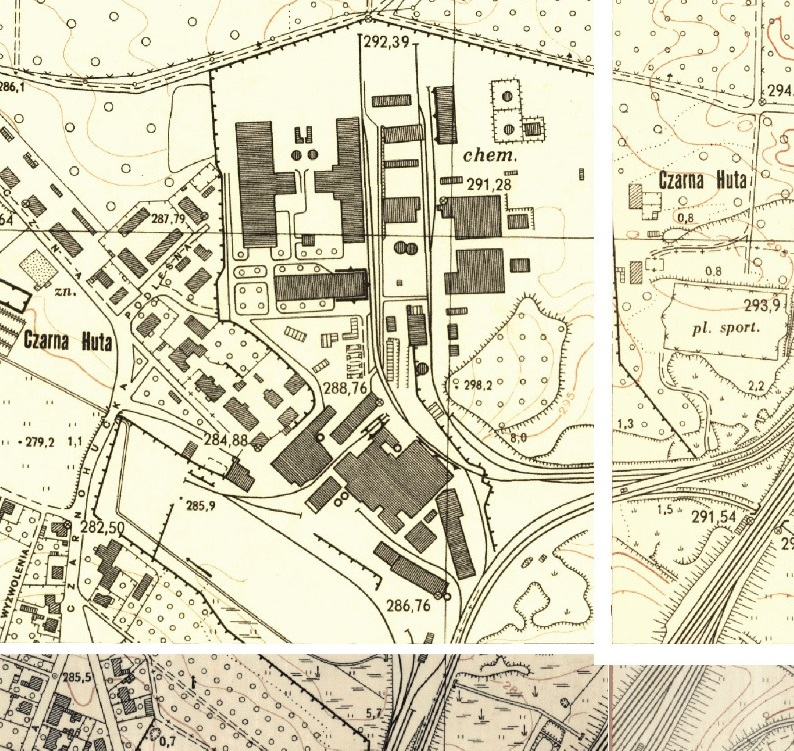
Tarnowskie Góry Chemical Plant on a section of a topographic map published between 1960 and 1966, based on surveys from 1958 to 1961

On 5 January 1950, by order of the Minister of Heavy Industry, the state-owned enterprise Tarnowskie Góry Inorganic Industry Plant was established. Shortly afterwards, on 12 July 1951, by order of the Minister of Chemical Industry, the name was changed to Tarnowskie Góry Chemical Plant. Loans obtained in the early 1950s enabled the plant to increase production. Between 1958 and 1968, the following divisions were opened: sulphur, lithopone, ammonium hydrosulfide, boron sulfide, sodium sulfide, and hydrochloric acid. A new research laboratory building, a quality control unit, and a design office were put into service between 1969 and 1970. In the following years, production of strontium reagents was started. In 1978, production was modernized, discontinuing the manufacture of, among other things, borax and soot, and introducing new products in their place (including magnesium phosphate and barium carbonate).

Between 1950 and 1967 260 million złotys was spent on investment projects. In addition to expanding production facilities, the plant's support infrastructure was also modernized (for approximately 160 million złotys, roads and plant warehouses were rebuilt, along with the water and sewage systems; an industrial spur, a new combined heat and power plant, repair workshops, and an office building were constructed). The value of production in 1967 amounted to over 283 million złotys.

As production expanded, employment at the plant increased. Between 1950 and 1965, 10 residential buildings for employees, a bathhouse, and a community center were constructed. In the following years, another 7 houses were added. Holiday centers were also established (including in Jakubowice) as well as a workers' hotel. On the initiative of the chemical plant, Kindergarten No. 8 was built, and in 1978 a school sports field was opened.

In 1973, the Bytom Local Industry Plant was merged into the Tarnowskie Góry facilities, where it operated as a branch until 1978.

By the late 1980s, the chemical plants had become uncompetitive, and as a result of the restructuring of the chemical industry, they began to lose their market for their products. The massive environmental contamination discovered in the following years – linked to the presence of unsecured industrial waste threatening to poison the groundwater and the waters of the Stoła river flowing through the southern part of the plant – led to the facility being added in 1994 to the national list of the largest polluters, the so-called List of 80. For this reason, and due to its poor economic situation, the company was liquidated the next year.

== Liquidation ==
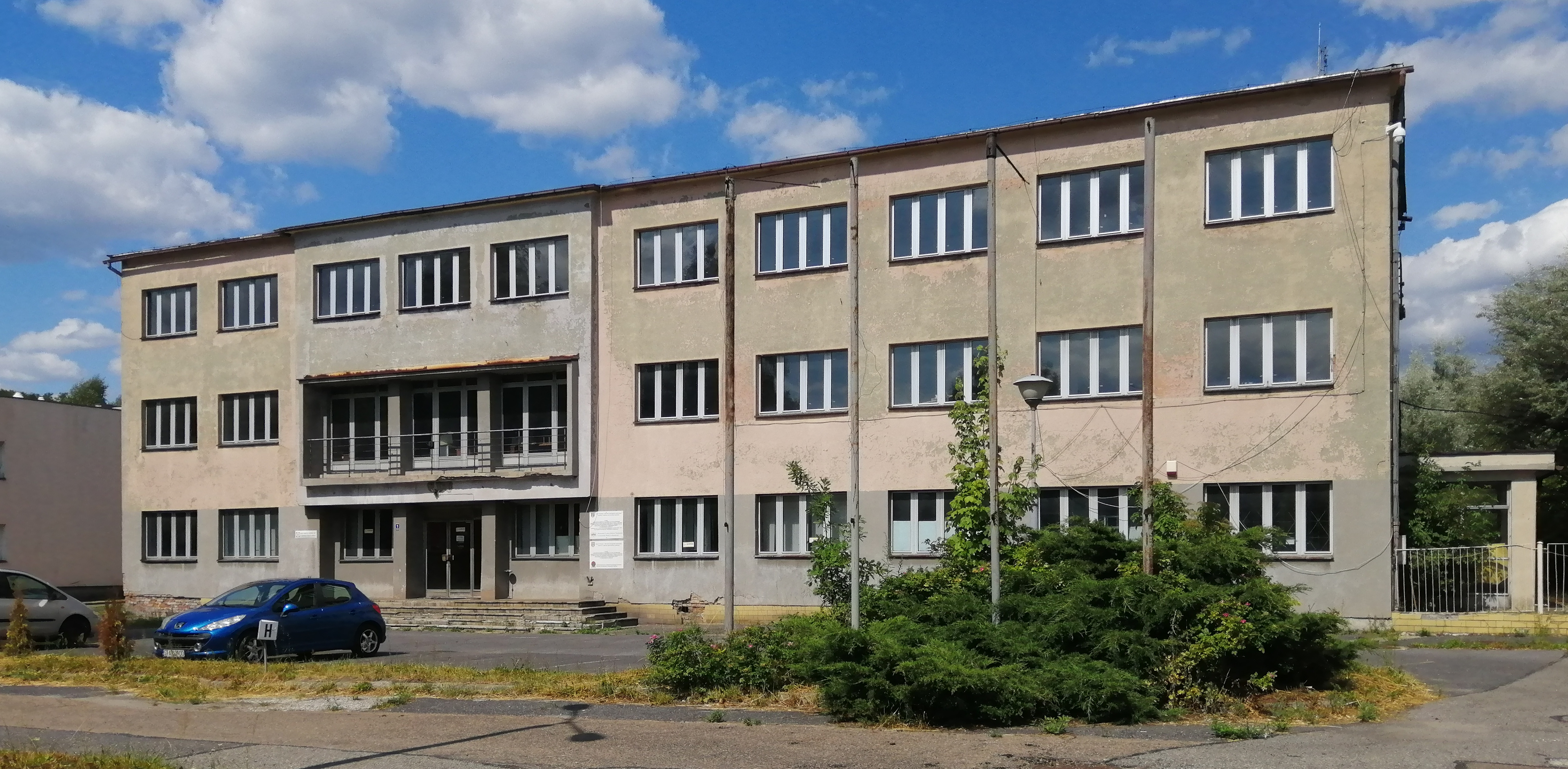
Administration building of the Tarnowskie Góry Chemical Plant (2019)

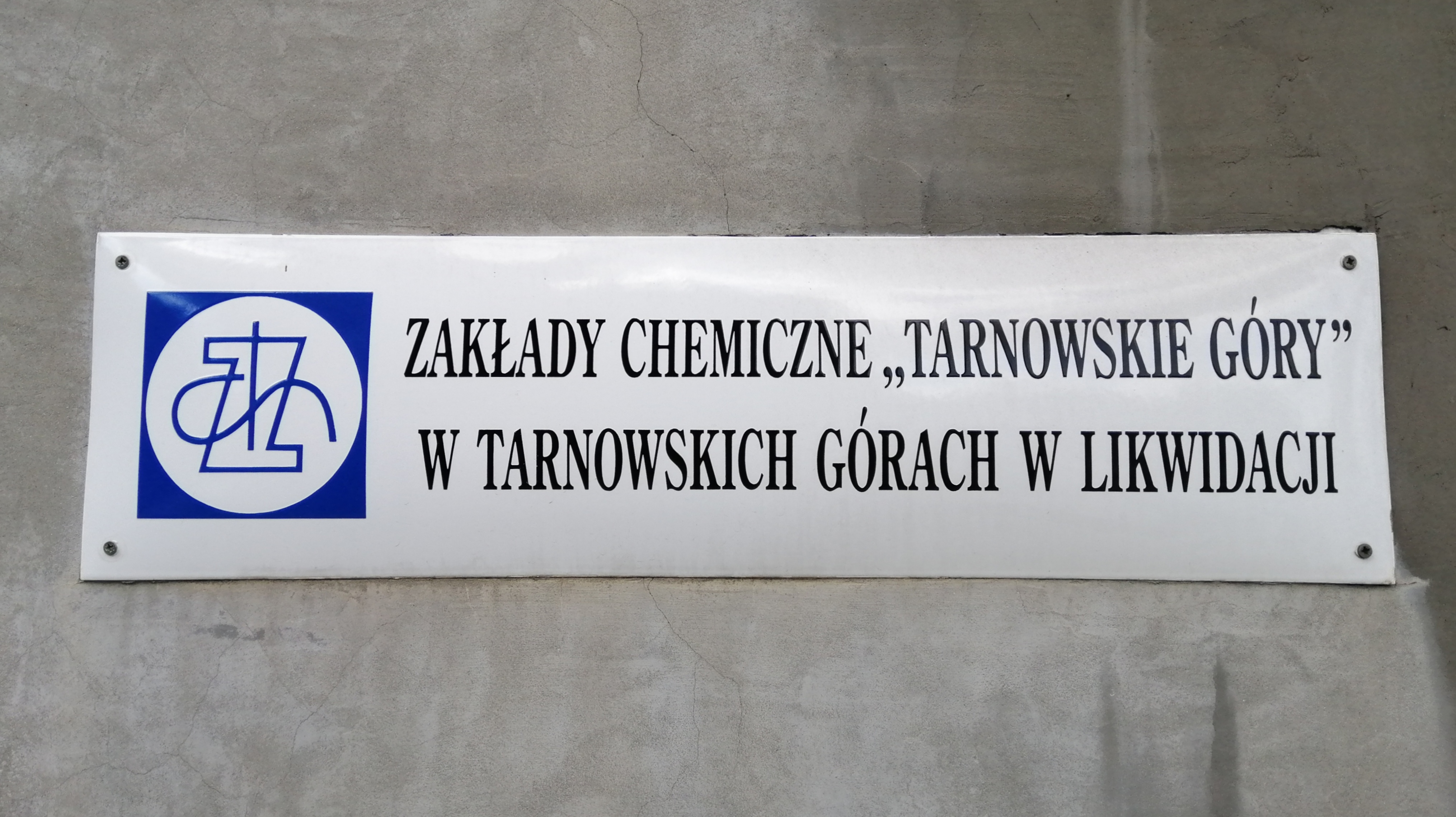
Plaque with the plant's logo (2020)

The Tarnowskie Góry Chemical Plant was to be liquidated by Order No. 42/Org/95 of the Minister of Trade and Industry of 26 June 1995. The process was scheduled to begin on 7 July of the same year. After the extent of contamination at the plant site was discovered, the obligation to undertake measures related to the reclamation of areas contaminated with chemical waste was included in the liquidation program, by Order No. 7/Org/96 of 26 January 1996 issued by the same minister. It was approved on 15 April 1996.

The first revitalization works on the company's premises took place from September 1997 to December 1998 and involved the modernization of the on-site wastewater treatment plant, the preparation of the area for a future hazardous waste landfill, and the diversion of a part of the Stoła river into a collector. In April 1999, a tender was announced for the preparation of design documentation for the removal of off-site waste dumps, the construction of a sealed landfill (the so-called Central Waste Landfill), the execution of demolition work, and the implementation of the Stoła river revitalization project. At the end of the same year, a tender procedure was conducted for the general contracting of the project, which was named "Protection of the Main Groundwater Reservoir 330 – Gliwice, through comprehensive waste disposal and the remediation of contaminated sites at the Tarnowskie Góry Chemical Plant in Tarnowskie Góry which is in the process of being liquidated".

In June 2000, work began on the cleanup of industrial waste sites, but it was quickly suspended due to a lack of funding. More intensive activity in this area took place between 2002 and 2006, when, for over 200 million złotys, almost two-thirds of the planned tasks were completed. Debts owed to the contractor for work performed in 2000 were also settled. Efforts were made to secure funding from the EU Cohesion Fund for further work, but the application was rejected and the project once again came to a standstill; only environmental monitoring and the operation of the wastewater treatment plant were carried out.

In 2004, under controversial circumstances, the Military Property Agency, which owned the land, sold plots totaling approximately 46 hectares to two private individuals, of which about 10 hectares were occupied by Waste Dump No. 1, with a volume of approximately 270,000 m³.

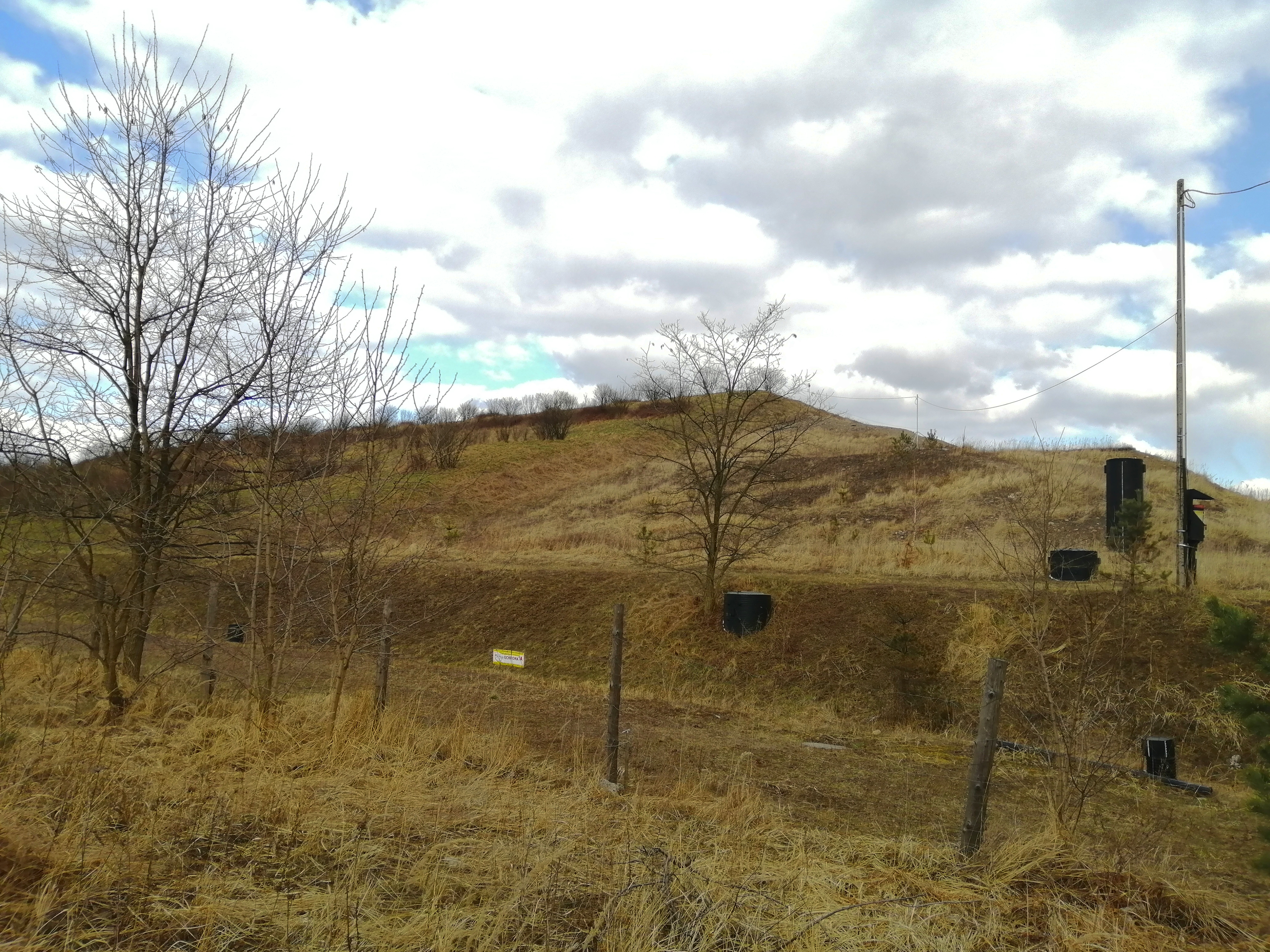
Part of cell K1 of the Central Waste Disposal Site (2021)

In July 2007, the chemical plant received a budget subsidy of 860,000 złotys, intended to co-finance work to secure the "Protection of the Main Groundwater Reservoir 330" project. Due to the lack of an appropriate legal basis, it was necessary to enact a special law for this purpose. In February of the following year, the liquidator of the chemical plant renounced the perpetual right of use of the property, as a result of which the plant's remaining assets were taken over by the State Treasury, represented by the Tarnowskie Góry starosta. In 2009, over 6 million złotys were allocated for the disposal of at least another 72,000 m³ of waste from landfill No. 5 and the completion of the reclamation of the K3 CSO section, which was carried out between 2010 and 2012.

By the end of 2011, the following work had been completed:

- chemical compounds remaining from production facilities were removed and rendered harmless (including barium carbonate, barium chloride, barium sulfide, barium nitrate, lithopone 30% and 60%, copper(II) sulfate);
- a sealed landfill consisting of five sections, the so-called Central Waste Disposal Site, was constructed, with a capacity of 1.29 million m³ and an area of 13.07 ha (including outer embankments);
- 99% of the above-ground structures were demolished, and the resulting rubble was used to construct the Central Waste Disposal Site's internal embankments and to stabilize its structure;
- hazardous waste dumps No. 2, 3, 3a, 5, 7, and the so-called "GIV area" were liquidated and the removal of landfills No. 4+4a and 6 was started;
- 1,019,000 m³ of hazardous waste (approximately 73% of the total waste scheduled for disposal) was rendered harmless by incorporating it into sections K1, K2, and K3 of the Central Waste Disposal Site;
- the area of 12.86 ha where the landfills were located was reclaimed, and the filled sections K1, K2, and K3 of the Central Waste Disposal Site (with a total area of 5.65 ha) were closed and reclaimed;
- the bed of the Stoła river was relocated, regulated, and lined over a length of 708 meters.

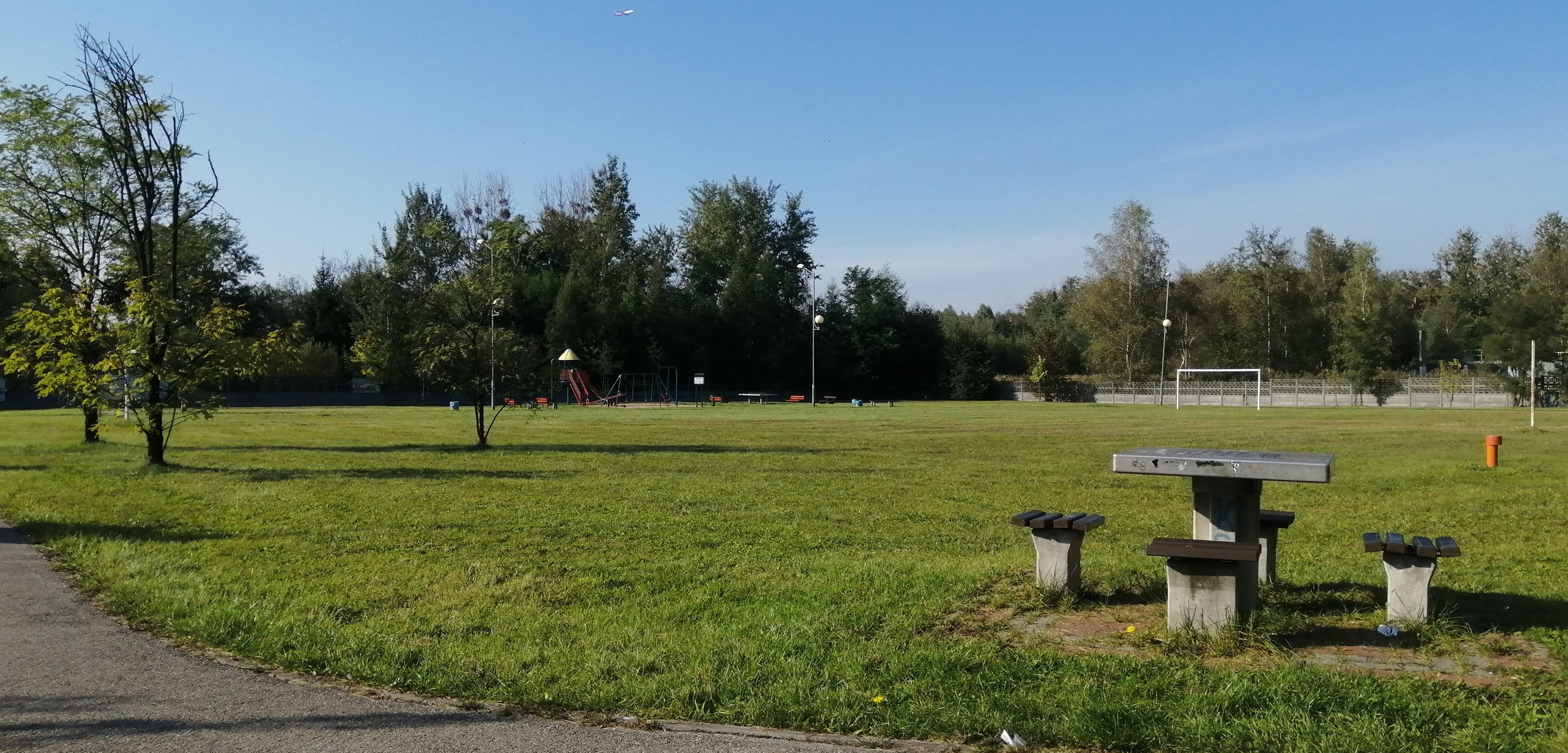
"GIV area" – reclaimed and transformed into a square with a sports field and playground (2019)

As of the end of 2011, approximately 27% of the remaining waste had yet to be removed and disposed of in cells K4 and K5 of the Central Waste Disposal Site (407,500 m³, or approximately 665,100 tonnes of hazardous waste) from landfill No. 1 (privately owned) and landfills 4+4a and 6. Additionally, embankments and contaminated soil containing debris and infrastructure foundations were designated for removal. 40.08 ha of the former plant sites remained to be fully reclaimed, including 7.74 ha of the K4 and K5 CSO sections still to be filled with waste.

Since 2012, no cleanup work has been carried out on the site of the former chemical plant (apart from necessary monitoring). The reasons cited for this situation include the fact that some of the waste is located on private land (landfill area No. 1 was sold in 2004), which makes it impossible to remove it using public funds, as well as the company's complicated legal situation – the liquidation of the plant was deemed complete, yet the company was still formally listed in the National Court Register, had debts amounting to approximately 3.6 million złotys, and was subject to debt collection proceedings.

In 2016, resolutions calling for "urgent action to comprehensively and permanently eliminate the hazards posed by hazardous waste left behind by the former state-owned enterprise Tarnowskie Góry Chemical Plant in Tarnowskie Góry" were adopted by the Tarnowskie Góry City Council, as well as the councils of neighboring cities and gminas, including Gliwice, Zabrze, Zbrosławice, Świerklaniec, Tworóg, and Rudziniec. After a symbolic 1,000 days had passed, the City Council of Tarnowskie Góry and the Tarnowskie Góry County Council renewed these appeals in June 2019.

In 2019, the Regional Directorate for Environmental Protection in Katowice carried out a procedure to enter 82 State Treasury-owned plots of land on which former chemical plants are located into the register of historical land contamination.

On 24 July 2020, the District Court in Gliwice removed the Tarnowskie Góry Chemical Plant company from the National Court Register. This decision became final on 13 April of the following year.

== Environmental impact ==
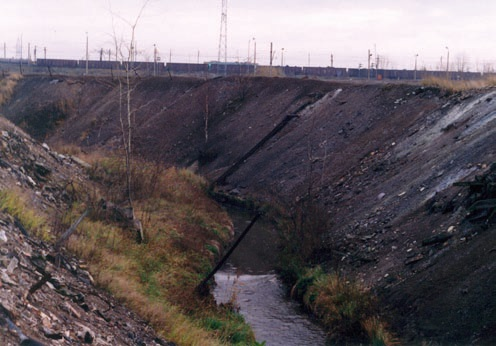
Stoła river flowing between landfills nos. 3 and 3a (1990s)

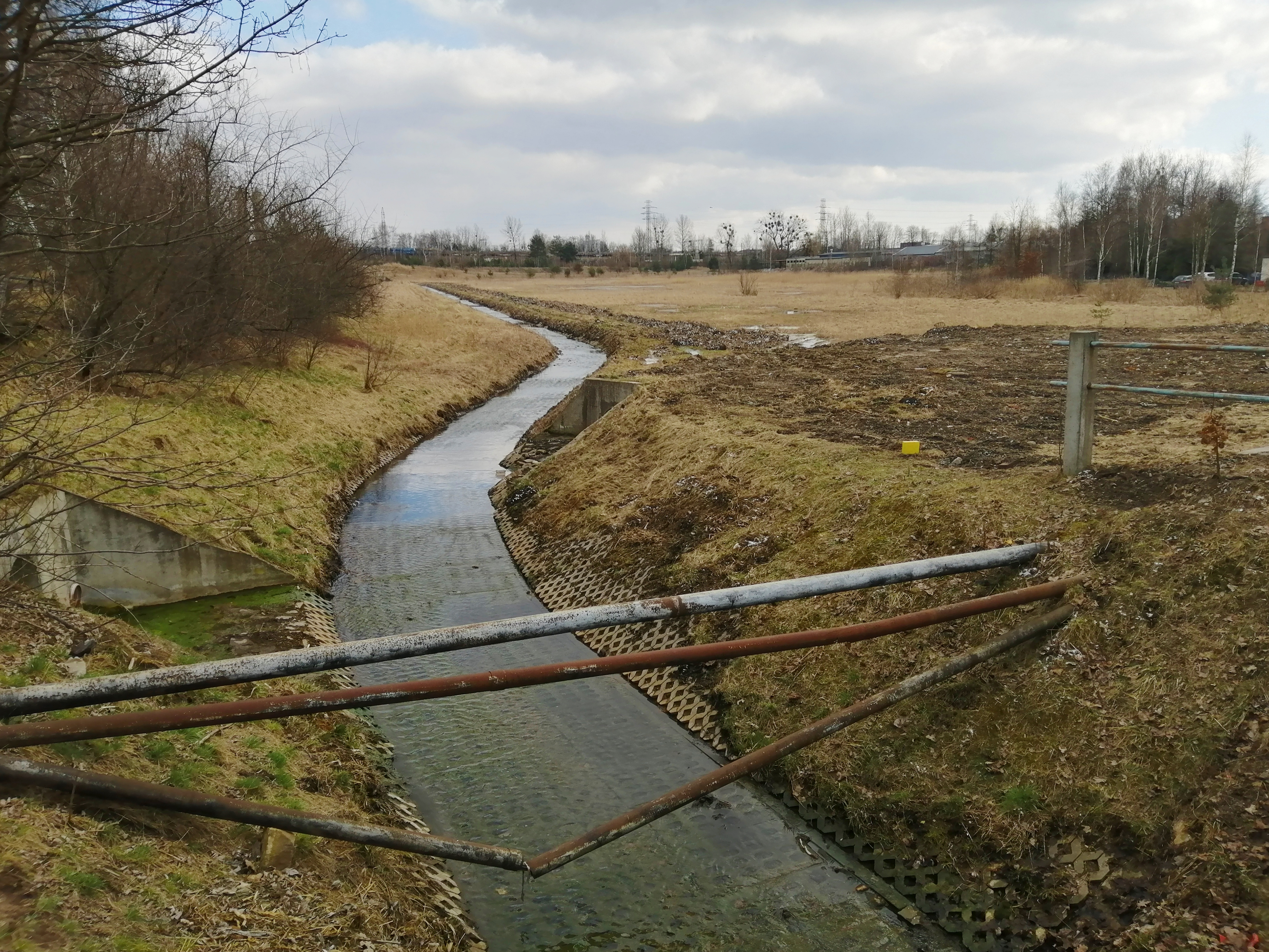
Reclaimed river flowing through the same area in 2021

The Tarnowskie Góry Chemical Plant is considered one of the most dangerous and environmentally harmful industrial facilities in Poland. The result of 75 years of operation was the accumulation of a massive amount of waste, estimated at approximately 1.5 million m³ (2.5 million tonnes), stored without any protective measures directly on the ground. For many years, liquid waste was discharged into unsealed earthen settling ponds. As a result of these actions, environmental contamination occurred, including the contamination of the Triassic aquifer of the main groundwater reservoirs, mainly the Gliwice (No. 330, infiltrated by pollutants from the southern part of the plant), Lubliniec–Myszków (No. 327, infiltrated by pollutants from the northern part), and Bytom (No. 329) aquifers.

After the introduction of groundwater and surface water monitoring in 1991, concentrations of highly toxic soluble barium compounds and harmful compounds of boron, zinc, copper, cadmium, lead, strontium, nickel, arsenic, and manganese were found to exceed permissible levels by as much as several hundred times. Based on studies using piezometers installed on the plant premises and in the surrounding area, the amount of infiltrating contaminants was estimated at 400 tons per year. For this reason, all water intakes located on the chemical plant premises and within their impact zone, covering several hundred hectares, were taken out of use.

In the case of Quaternary formations, it was demonstrated that some of the pollutants from off-site landfills flow northwest toward the PA stream, while others flow southwest and southeast toward the Stoła river, which poses a risk of contaminant transport to more distant areas and into the Mała Panew river. In the second decade of the 21st century, the Stoła remained one of the most polluted rivers in Poland, with standards exceeded not only for thallium and fluorides but also for salinity, biogenic substances, and oxygen conditions. Exceedances of standards for thallium were also found in the waters of the Mała Panew. Contamination of surface waters with this element is otherwise rarely observed in Poland.

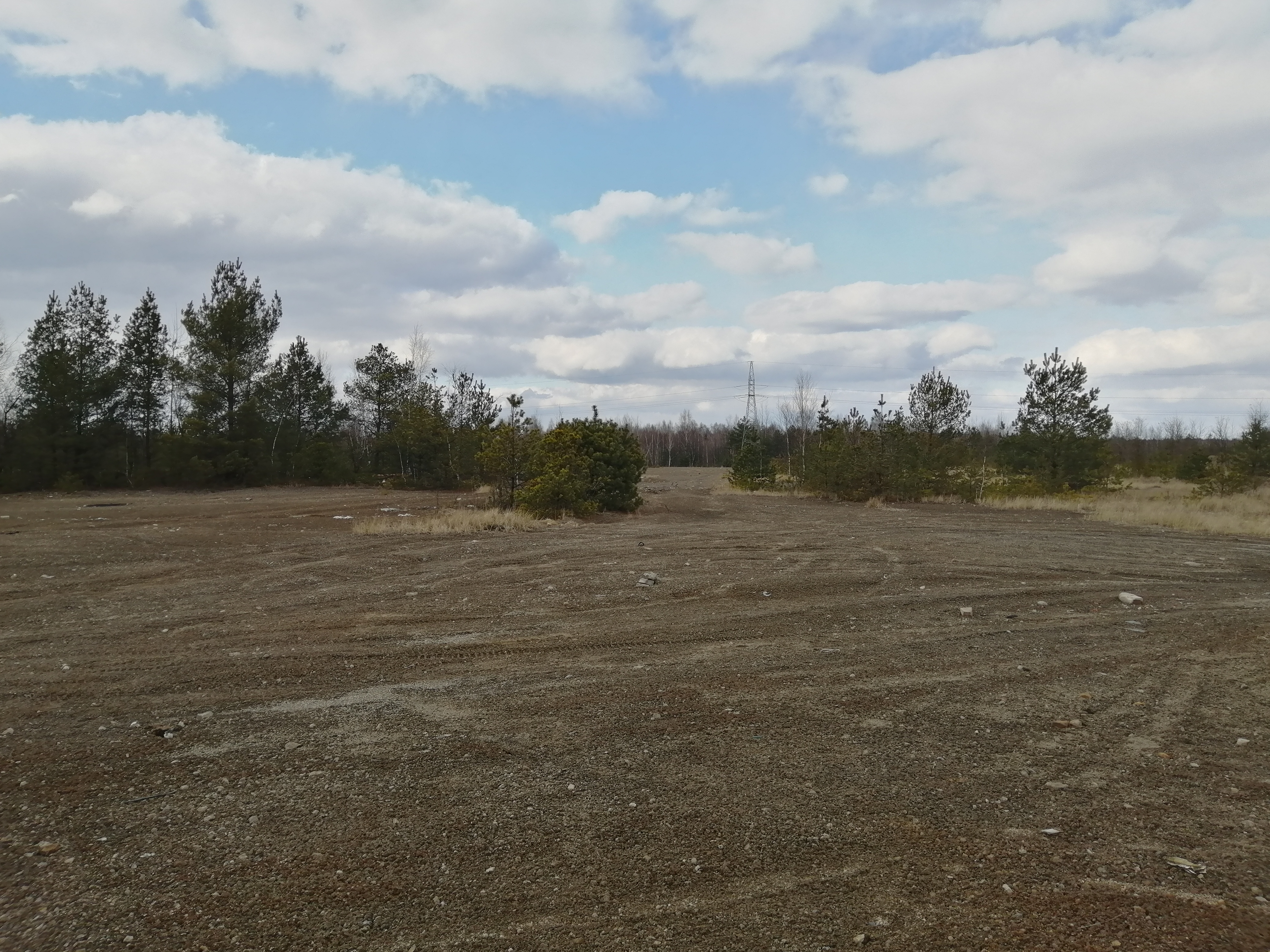
Area of landfill No. 1 (March 2021)

Initially, the monitoring was used only to assess the extent of environmental contamination resulting from the plants' operations, but since 1997, it has also been used to evaluate the ongoing reclamation project. Despite the completion of most of the work, approximately 130 tons of pollutants still seep into the Quaternary and Triassic aquifers each year. The area of impact of the chemical plants on Quaternary aquifers was estimated at approximately 240 ha, and on Triassic aquifers at approximately 250 ha. The negative impact of the landfills No. 1, 4+4a, and 6 – designated for liquidation – on the state of the environment is also observed in monitoring studies of the Stoła river, in the PA stream located north of the plants, and in soil monitoring results.

In 2011, an article by a group of researchers from the Faculty of Earth Sciences of the University of Silesia in Katowice and the Faculty of Geology, Geophysics, and Environmental Protection of the AGH University of Kraków was published in the journal Ochrona Środowiska i Zasobów Naturalnych (Environmental Protection and Natural Resources). The study examined the impact of air pollutant emissions from the Tarnowskie Góry Chemical Plant on the width of annual growth rings of Scotch pine. The research found reduced annual growth in pines growing around the plant and demonstrated that the most significant reductions in growth occurred during the years of peak industrial production at the plant (between 1960 and 1980).

== Bibliography ==
- Grabania, Marek (1969). "W Polsce Ludowej. Przemysł" [In People's Poland. Industry]. In Rechowicz, Henryk (ed.). Tarnowskie Góry. Zarys rozwoju powiatu [Tarnowskie Góry. An Outline of the Development of the County] (in Polish). Katowice: Śląsk.
- Marciniak, Jan (2000). "Lata II wojny światowej i powojennego półwiecza. Życie gospodarcze. Problematyka ekologiczna w mieście" [The Years of World War II and the Post-War Half-Century. Economic Life. Ecological Issues in the City]. In Drabina, Jan (ed.). Historia Tarnowskich Gór [History of Tarnowskie Góry] (in Polish). Tarnowskie Góry: Museum in Tarnowskie Góry. ISBN 83-911508-3-6.
- Moszny, Józef (2000). "Miasto pod panowaniem pruskim i w obrębie II Rzeszy Niemieckiej (1763–1918). Życie gospodarcze" [The City Under Prussian Rule and Within the German Empire (1763–1918). Economic Life]. In Drabina, Jan (ed.). Historia Tarnowskich Gór [History of Tarnowskie Góry] (in Polish). Tarnowskie Góry: Museum in Tarnowskie Góry. ISBN 83-911508-3-6.
- Nowak, Jan (2014). Kronika Miasta i Powiatu Tarnowskie Góry: najstarsze dzieje Śląska i ziemi Bytomsko-Tarnogórskiej: dzieje pierwszego górnictwa w Polsce [Chronicle of the City and County of Tarnowskie Góry: The Oldest History of Silesia and the Bytom–Tarnowskie Góry Land: History of the First Mining in Poland] (in Polish). Tarnowskie Góry: Księgarnia Polska Jana Nowaka. ISBN 978-83-934107-9-8.
