= Pickeringite =

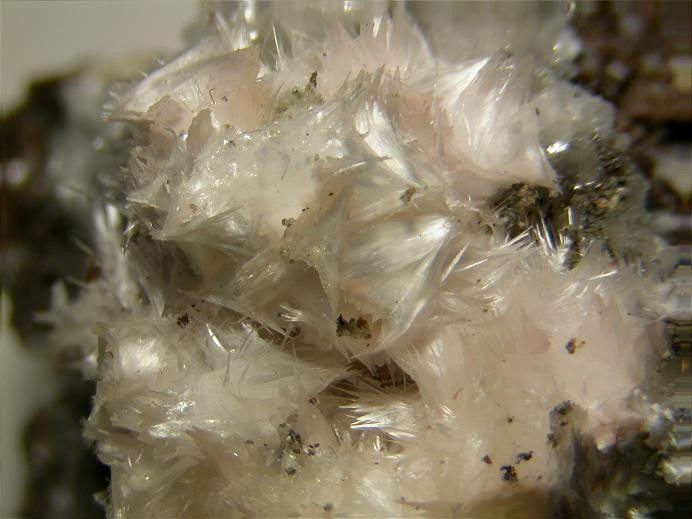
- Cobalt rich pickeringite from the Northern Slanské Mts, Prešov Region, Slovakia

General
- Category: Sulfate mineral
- Formula: MgAl_{2}(SO_{4})_{4}·22(H_{2}O)
- IMA symbol: Pkg
- Strunz classification: 7.CB.85
- Crystal system: Monoclinic
- Crystal class: Prismatic (2/m) (same H-M symbol)
- Space group: P2_{1}/c
- Unit cell: a = 20.8, b = 24.2, c = 6.18 [Å]; β = 95°; Z = 4

Identification
- Color: Colorless, white; may be shades of yellow, green, or red due to impurities
- Crystal habit: Rarely as acicular crystals, radial or matted aggregates; typically as incrustations and efflorescences
- Cleavage: Poor on {010}
- Fracture: Conchoidal
- Mohs scale hardness: 1.5
- Luster: Vitreous
- Diaphaneity: Semitransparent
- Specific gravity: 1.73–1.79
- Optical properties: Biaxial (−)
- Refractive index: n_{α} = 1.476 n_{β} = 1.480 n_{γ} = 1.483
- Birefringence: δ = 0.007
- 2V angle: Measured: 60°
- Solubility: Completely soluble in water
- Common impurities: May contain iron, manganese or cobalt

Pickeringite is a magnesium aluminium sulfate mineral with formula MgAl_{2}(SO_{4})_{4}·22(H_{2}O). It forms a series with halotrichite.

It forms as an alteration product of pyrite in aluminium rich rocks and in coal seams. It also occurs in pyrite rich hydrothermal ore deposits in arid regions. It forms in fumaroles and in caves. It occurs with kalinite, alunogen, epsomite, melanterite, copiapite and gypsum.

It was first described in 1844 as reflective for an occurrence in Cerros Pintados, Pampa del Tamarugal, Iquique Province, Tarapacá Region, Chile. It was named for American linguist and philologist John Pickering (1777–1846).

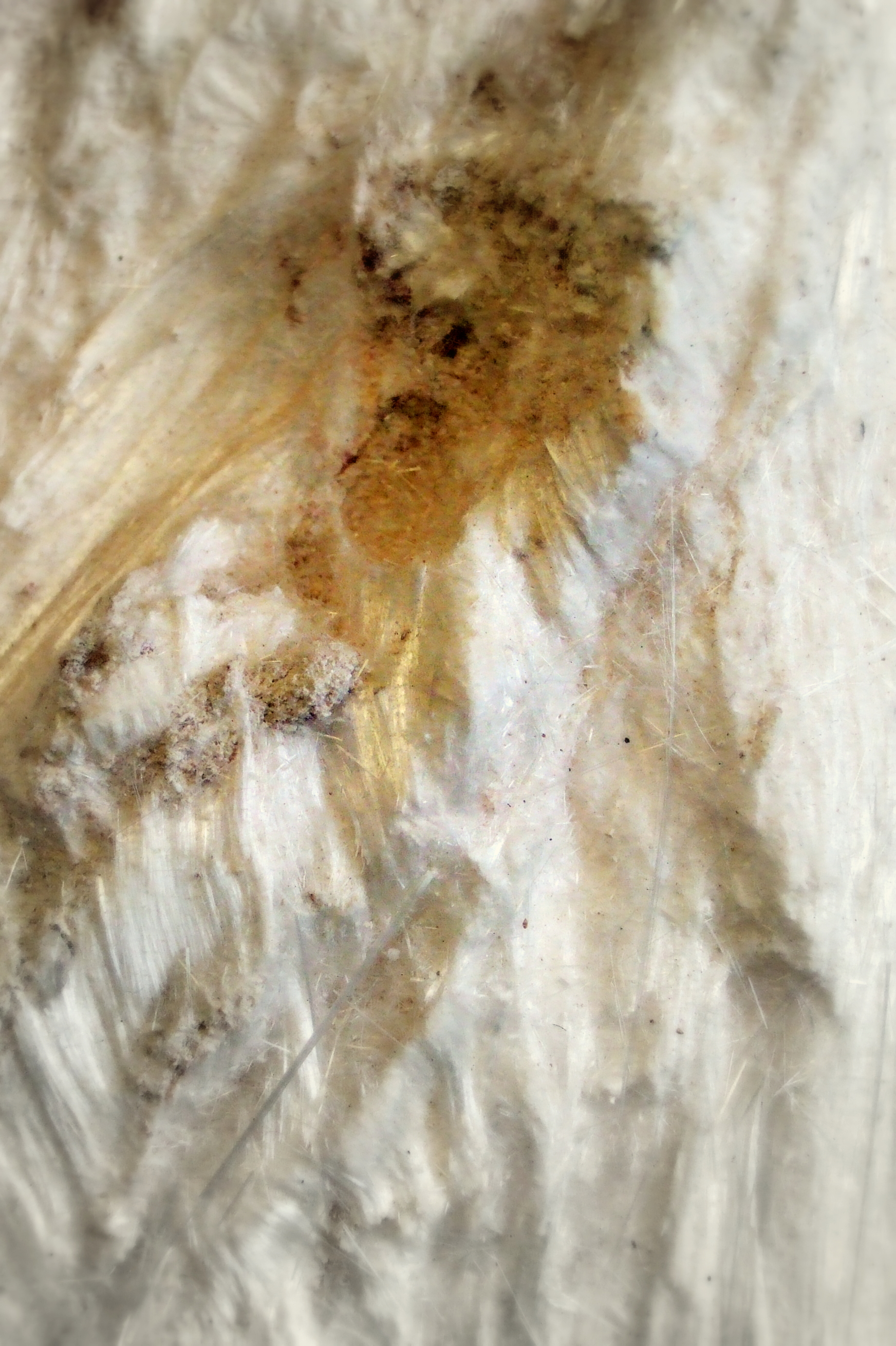
Pickeringite in the Natural History Museum
