= Manganese(II) sulfate =

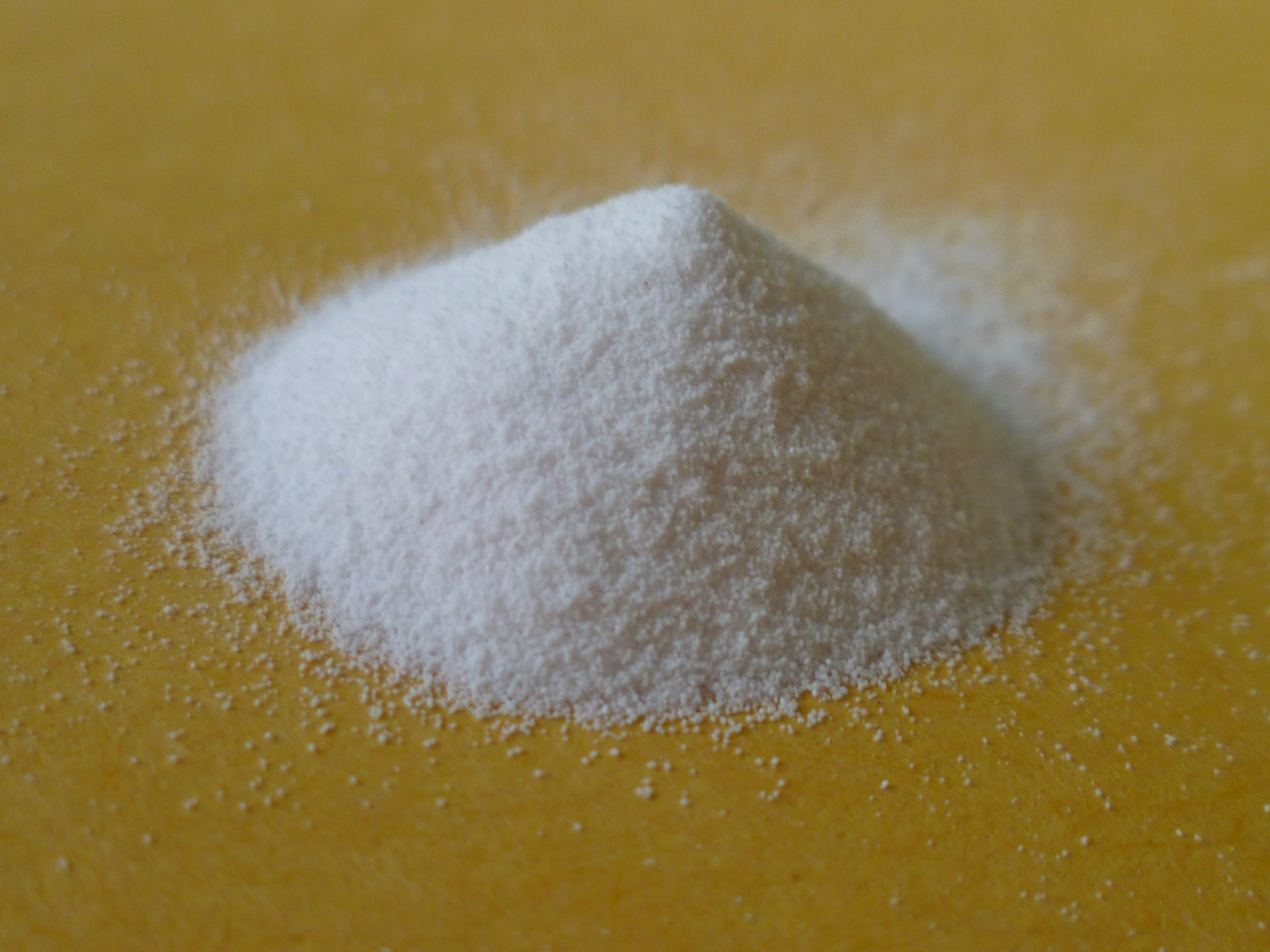
- Manganese(II) sulfate monohydrate

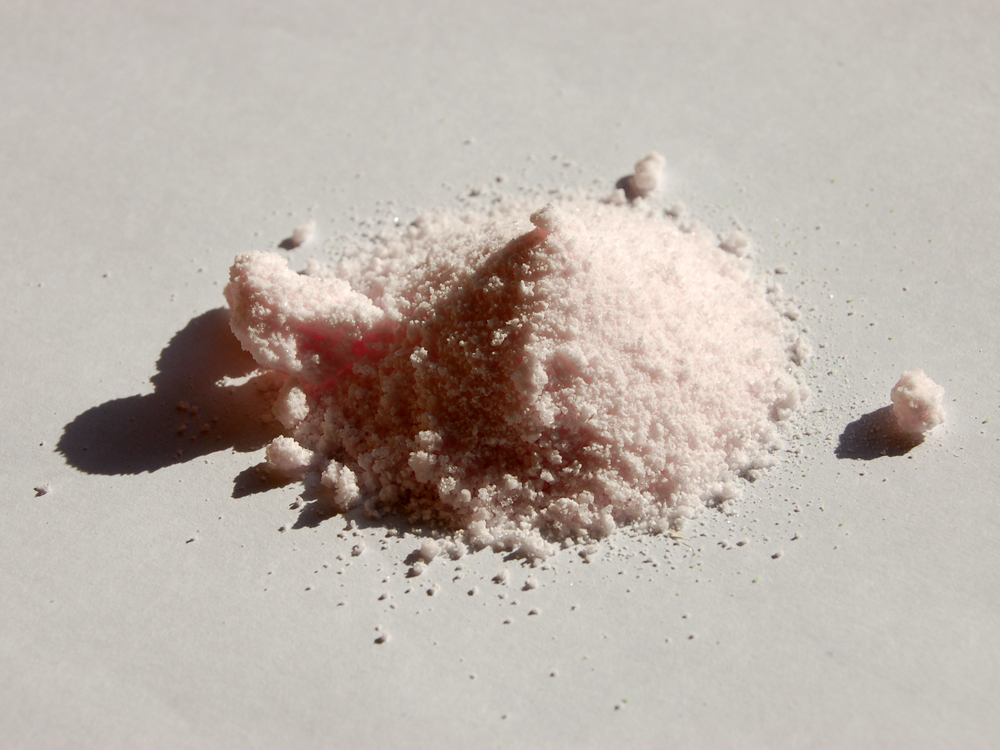
- Manganese(II) sulfate tetrahydrate

Names
- IUPAC name Manganese(II) sulfate

Identifiers
| CAS Number | 7785-87-7; 10034-96-5 (monohydrate); 10101-68-5 (tetrahydrate) |
| 3D model (JSmol) | Interactive image |
| ChEBI | CHEBI:86360 |
| ChEMBL | ChEMBL1200557 |
| ChemSpider | 22984 |
| ECHA InfoCard | 100.029.172 |
| EC Number | 232-089-9 |
| PubChem CID | 24580 |
| RTECS number | OP1050000 (anhydrous) OP0893500 (tetrahydrate) |
| UNII | IGA15S9H40; W00LYS4T26 (monohydrate); F46LH60L4M (tetrahydrate) |
| CompTox Dashboard (EPA) | DTXSID9044160 |
- InChI: InChI=1S/Mn.H2O4S/c;1-5(2,3)4/h;(H2,1,2,3,4)/q+2;/p-2 Key: SQQMAOCOWKFBNP-UHFFFAOYSA-L; InChI=1/Mn.H2O4S/c;1-5(2,3)4/h;(H2,1,2,3,4)/q+2;/p-2 Key: SQQMAOCOWKFBNP-NUQVWONBAV
- SMILES: [Mn+2].[O-]S([O-])(=O)=O

Properties
| Chemical formula | MnSO_{4} |
| Molar mass | 151.001 g/mol (anhydrous); 169.02 g/mol (monohydrate); 223.07 g/mol (tetrahydrate); 277.11 g/mol (heptahydrate) |
| Appearance | white crystals (anhydrous) pale pink solid (hydrates) |
| Density | 3.25 g/cm^{3} (anhydrous); 2.95 g/cm^{3} (monohydrate); 2.107 g/cm^{3} (tetrahydrate) |
| Melting point | 710 °C (1,310 °F; 983 K) (anhydrous); 27 °C (tetrahydrate) |
| Boiling point | 850 °C (1,560 °F; 1,120 K) (anhydrous) |
| Solubility in water | 52 g/100 mL (5 °C); 70 g/100 mL (70 °C) |
| Solubility | Very slightly soluble in methanol insoluble in ether and ethanol. |
| Magnetic susceptibility (χ) | 1.3660×10^{−2} cm^{3}/mol |

Structure
| Crystal structure | orthogonal (anhydrous) monoclinic (monohydrate) monoclinic (tetrahydrate) |

Hazards
- GHS labelling
| Pictograms | (GHS08: Health hazard) (GHS09: Environmental hazard) |
| Signal word | Warning |
| Hazard statements | H373, H411 |
| Precautionary statements | P260, P273, P314, P391, P501 |
| NFPA 704 (fire diamond) | 1 0 1 |
| Safety data sheet (SDS) | ICSC 0290 |

Related compounds
| Other cations | Chromium(III) sulfate Iron(II) sulfate |
- Except where otherwise noted, data are given for materials in their standard state (at 25 °C [77 °F], 100 kPa). verify (what is ?) Infobox references

Manganese(II) sulfate usually refers to the inorganic compound with the formula MnSO_{4}·H_{2}O. This pale pink deliquescent solid is a commercially significant manganese(II) salt. Approximately 260,000 tonnes of manganese(II) sulfate were produced worldwide in 2005. It is the precursor to manganese metal and many other chemical compounds. Manganese-deficient soil is remediated with this salt.

== Structure ==
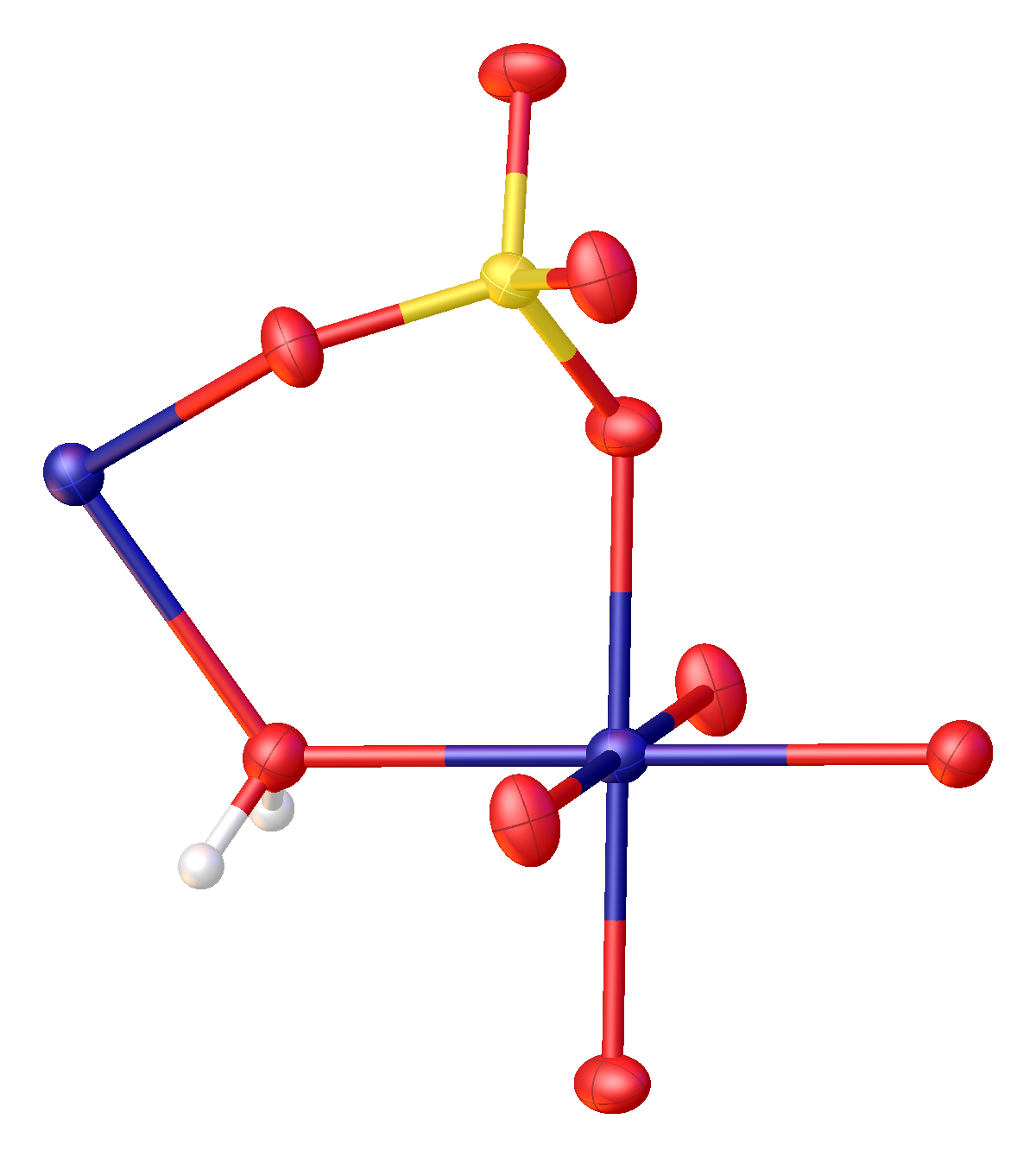
Coordination sphere for Mn and S in the monohydrate. The O_{6} coordination sphere is provided by four separate sulfate groups and a pair of mutually trans bridging aquo ligands.

Like many metal sulfates, manganese sulfate forms a variety of hydrates: monohydrate, tetrahydrate, pentahydrate, and heptahydrate. All of these salts dissolve in water to give faintly pink solutions of the aquo complex [Mn(H_{2}O)_{6}]^{2+}. The structure of MnSO_{4}·H_{2}O has been determined by X-ray crystallography (see figure). The tetrahydrate also features Mn(II) in an O_{6} coordination sphere provided by bridging two sulfate anions and four aquo ligands.

== Applications and production ==
Typically, manganese ores are purified by their conversion to manganese(II) sulfate. Treatment of aqueous solutions of the sulfate with sodium carbonate leads to precipitation of manganese carbonate, which can be calcined to give the oxides MnO_{x}. In the laboratory, manganese sulfate can be made by treating manganese dioxide with sulfur dioxide:

MnO_{2} + SO_{2} + H_{2}O → MnSO_{4}(H_{2}O)

It can also be made by mixing potassium permanganate with sodium hydrogen sulfate and hydrogen peroxide.

Manganese sulfate is a by-product of various industrially significant oxidations that use manganese dioxide, including the manufacture of hydroquinone and anisaldehyde.

=== Electrolysis ===
Electrolysis of manganese sulfate reverses the above reaction yielding manganese dioxide, which is called EMD for electrolytic manganese dioxide. Alternatively oxidation of manganese sulfate with potassium permanganate yields the so-called chemical manganese dioxide (CMD). These materials, especially EMD, are used in dry-cell batteries.

== Natural occurrence ==
Manganese(II) sulfate minerals are very rare in nature and always occur as hydrates. The monohydrate is called szmikite; the tetrahydrate is called ilesite; the pentahydrate is called jōkokuite; the hexahydrate, the most rare, is called chvaleticeite; and the heptahydrate is called mallardite.
