= Copperas Mountain =

Mountain in Ohio, United States

Coordinates: 39°12′57″N 83°11′44″W

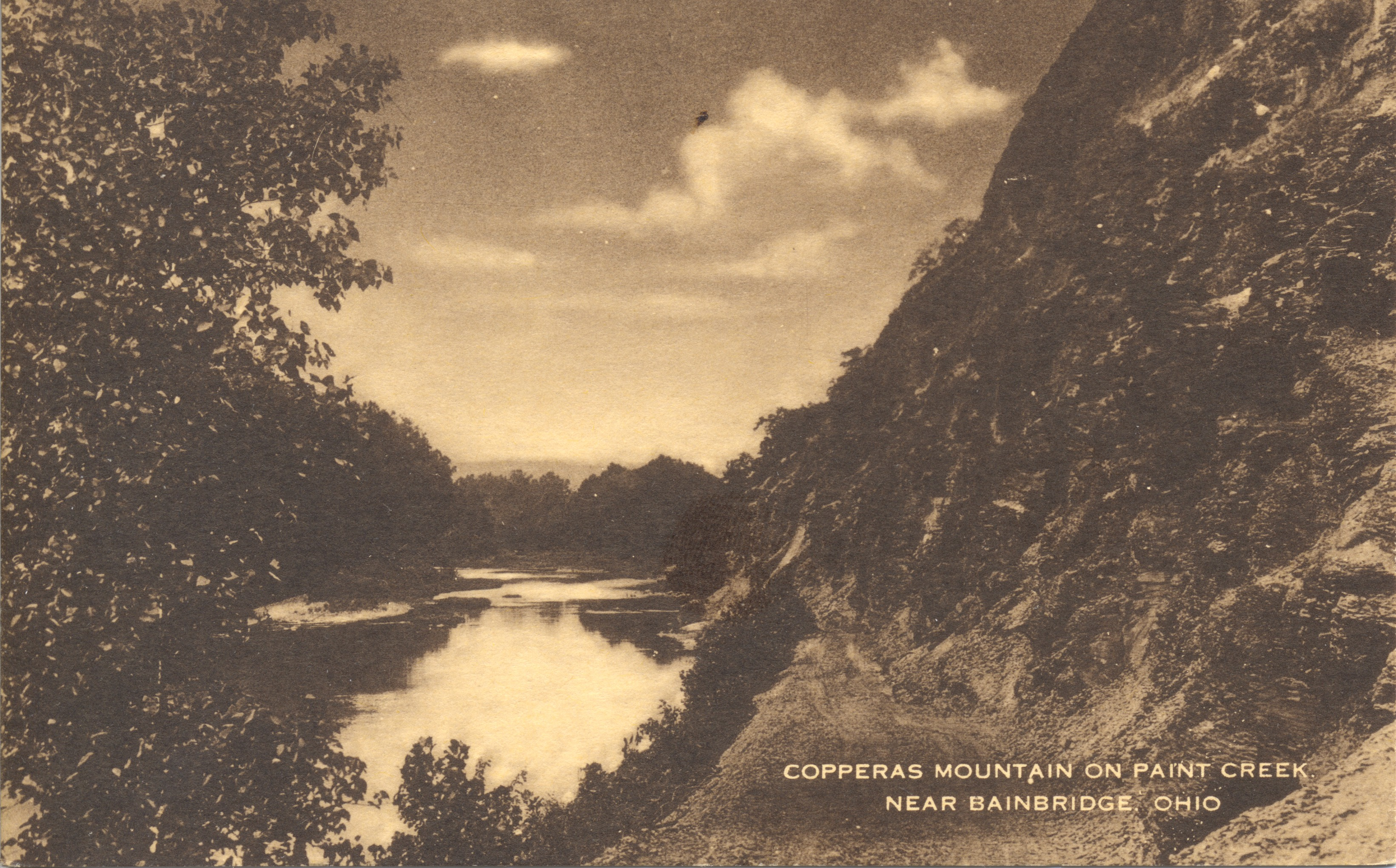
An old postcard of Copperas Mountain

Copperas Mountain (sometimes called "Big Copperas Mountain") is a summit in the U.S. state of Ohio.

Copperas Mountain was so named on account of deposits of copperas in the area.
