= Iron(II) sulfate =

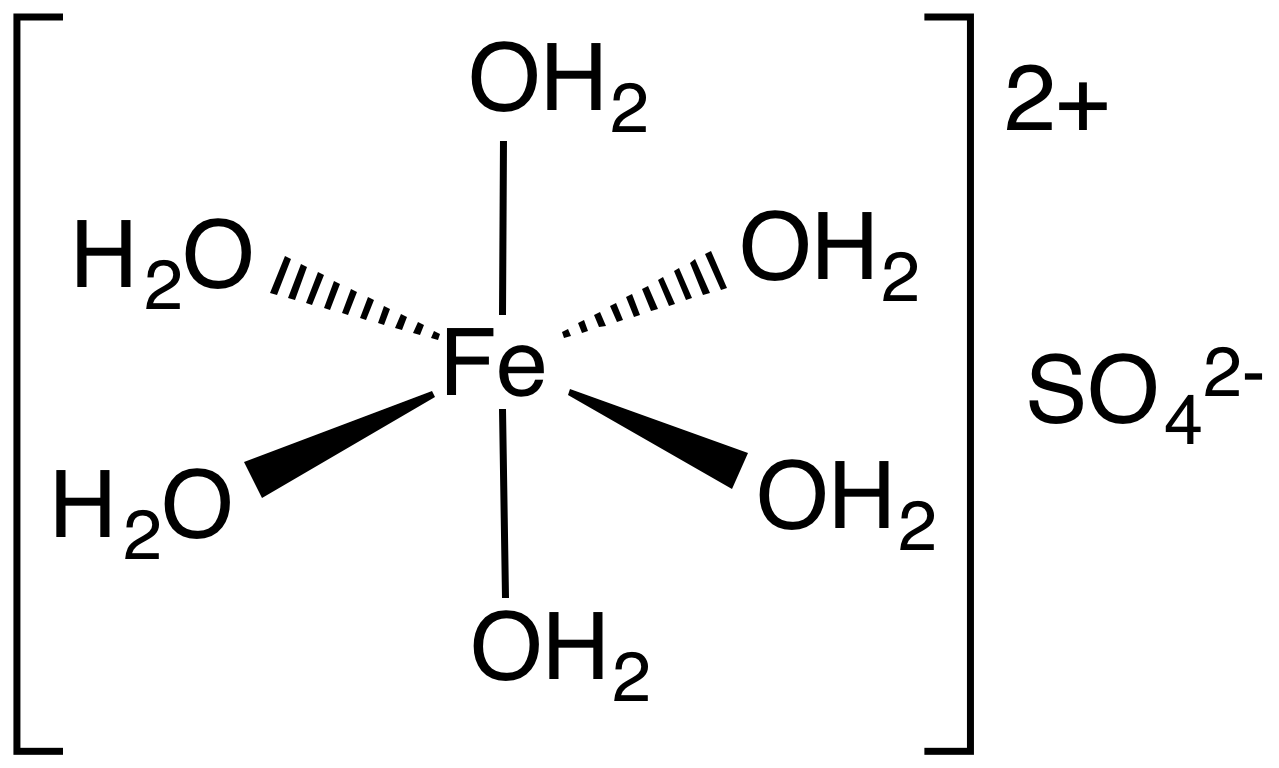
- Skeletal formula of iron(II) sulfate

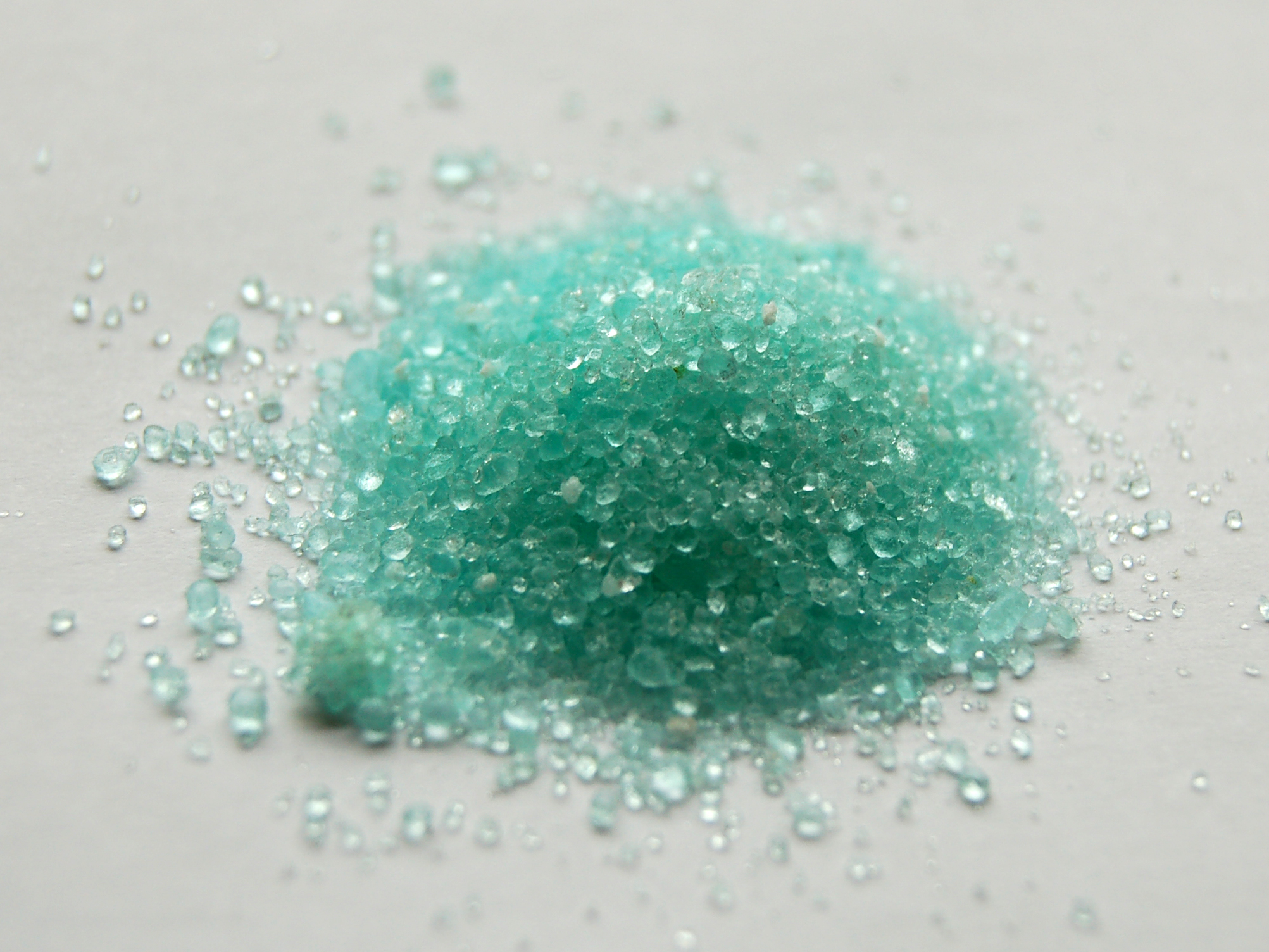
- Sample of iron(II) sulfate heptahydrate

Names
- IUPAC name Iron(II) sulfate
- Other names: Iron(II) sulphate; Ferrous sulfate; Green vitriol; Iron vitriol; Ferrous vitriol; Copperas; Melanterite; Szomolnokite

Identifiers
CAS Number	anhydrous: 7720-78-7; monohydrate: 17375-41-6; dihydrate: 10028-21-4; heptahydrate: 7782-63-0
3D model (JSmol)	anhydrous: Interactive image; heptahydrate: Interactive image
ChEBI	anhydrous: CHEBI:75832
ChEMBL	anhydrous: ChEMBL1200830
ChemSpider	anhydrous: 22804; monohydrate: 56459; heptahydrate: 22804
ECHA InfoCard	100.028.867
EC Number	anhydrous: 231-753-5
PubChem CID	anhydrous: 24393; monohydrate: 62712; heptahydrate: 62662
RTECS number	anhydrous: NO8500000 (anhydrous) NO8510000 (heptahydrate)
UNII	anhydrous: 2IDP3X9OUD; monohydrate: RIB00980VW; dihydrate: G0Z5449449; heptahydrate: 39R4TAN1VT
UN number	3077
CompTox Dashboard (EPA)	anhydrous: DTXSID0029688
- InChI: InChI=1S/Fe.H2O4S/c;1-5(2,3)4/h;(H2,1,2,3,4)/q+2;/p-2 Key: BAUYGSIQEAFULO-UHFFFAOYSA-L; anhydrous: InChI=1/Fe.H2O4S/c;1-5(2,3)4/h;(H2,1,2,3,4)/q+2;/p-2 Key: BAUYGSIQEAFULO-NUQVWONBAS
- SMILES: anhydrous: [Fe+2].[O-]S([O-])(=O)=O; heptahydrate: [OH2+][Fe-4]([OH2+])([OH2+])([OH2+])([OH2+])[OH2+].[O-]S(=O)(=O)[O-].O

Properties
Chemical formula	FeSO_{4}
Molar mass	151.91 g/mol (anhydrous); 169.93 g/mol (monohydrate); 241.99 g/mol (pentahydrate); 260.00 g/mol (hexahydrate); 278.02 g/mol (heptahydrate)
Appearance	White crystals (anhydrous); White-yellow crystals (monohydrate); Blue-green deliquescent crystals (heptahydrate)
Odor	Odorless
Density	3.65 g/cm^{3} (anhydrous); 3.0 g/cm^{3} (monohydrate); 2.15 g/cm^{3} (pentahydrate); 1.934 g/cm^{3} (hexahydrate); 1.895 g/cm^{3} (heptahydrate)
Melting point	680 °C (1,256 °F; 953 K) (anhydrous, decomposes); 300 °C (572 °F; 573 K) (monohydrate, decomposes); 60 °C (140 °F; 333 K) (heptahydrate, decomposes)
Solubility in water	29.5 g/100 g (anhydrous, monohydrate, heptahydrate)
Solubility in ethylene glycol	6.38 g/100 g (20 °C (68 °F), anhydrous)
Solubility in glycerol	25 g/100 g (15 °C (59 °F), anhydrous)
Vapor pressure	14.6 hPa (11.0 mmHg) (heptahydrate)
Magnetic susceptibility (χ)	12400×10^{−6} cm^{3}/mol (anhydrous); 10500×10^{−6} cm^{3}/mol (monohydrate); 11200×10^{−6} cm^{3}/mol (heptahydrate)
Refractive index (n_{D})	1.591 (monohydrate); 1.527 (21 °C (70 °F), tetrahydrate); 1.514 (pentahydrate); 1.468 (hexahydrate); 1.471 (heptahydrate)

Structure (anhydrous)
Crystal structure	Orthorhombic, oP24
Space group	Pnma, No. 62 (anhydrous)
Point group	mmm (anhydrous)
Lattice constant	a = 8.704(2) Å, b = 6.801(3) Å, c = 4.786(8) Å (293 K (20 °C; 68 °F)) α = 90°, β = 90°, γ = 90° anhydrous
Coordination geometry	Octahedral (Fe^{2+})

Structure (hydrates)
Crystal structure	Monoclinic, mS36 (monohydrate); Monoclinic, mP72 (tetrahydrate); Triclinic, aP42 (pentahydrate); Monoclinic, mS192 (hexahydrate); Monoclinic, mP108 (heptahydrate)
Space group	C2/c, No. 15 (monohydrate, hexahydrate); P2_{1}/n, No. 14 (tetrahydrate); P1̅, No. 2 (pentahydrate); P2_{1}/c, No. 14 (heptahydrate)
Point group	2/m (monohydrate, tetrahydrate, hexahydrate, heptahydrate); 1̅ (pentahydrate)

Thermochemistry (anhydrous)
Heat capacity (C)	100.6 J⋅mol^{−1}⋅K^{−1}
Std molar entropy (S^{⦵}_{298})	107.5 J⋅mol^{−1}⋅K^{−1}
Std enthalpy of formation (Δ_{f}H^{⦵}_{298})	−928.4 kJ⋅mol^{−1}
Gibbs free energy (Δ_{f}G^{⦵})	−820.8 kJ⋅mol^{−1}

Thermochemistry (heptahydrate)
Heat capacity (C)	394.5 J⋅mol^{−1}⋅K^{−1}
Std molar entropy (S^{⦵}_{298})	409.1 J⋅mol^{−1}⋅K^{−1}
Std enthalpy of formation (Δ_{f}H^{⦵}_{298})	−3016 kJ⋅mol^{−1}
Gibbs free energy (Δ_{f}G^{⦵})	−2512 kJ⋅mol^{−1}

Hazards
- GHS labelling
Pictograms	(GHS07: Exclamation mark)
Signal word	Warning
Hazard statements	H302, H315, H319
Precautionary statements	P264, P270, P280, P301+P312+P330, P302+P352, P305+P351+P338, P332+P313, P337+P313, P362, P501
NFPA 704 (fire diamond)	2 1 1
Threshold limit value (TLV)	1 mg/m^{3} (TWA)
- Lethal dose or concentration (LD, LC)
LD_{50} (median dose)	319 mg/kg (rat, oral)
- NIOSH (US health exposure limits)
PEL (Permissible)	1 mg/m^{3}
REL (Recommended)	1 mg/m^{3} (TWA)

Related compounds
Other cations	Cobalt(II) sulfate; Copper(II) sulfate; Manganese(II) sulfate; Nickel(II) sulfate
Related compounds	Iron(III) sulfate
- Except where otherwise noted, data are given for materials in their standard state (at 25 °C [77 °F], 100 kPa). verify (what is ?) Infobox references

Iron(II) sulfate or ferrous sulfate (British English: sulphate instead of sulfate) denotes a range of salts of iron with the sulfate ion with the formula FeSO_{4}·xH_{2}O. The blue-green heptahydrate (hydrate with 7 molecules of water) is the most common form of this material. The hydrated form is used medically to treat or prevent iron deficiency, and also for industrial applications. Known since ancient times as copperas and as green vitriol (vitriol is an archaic name for hydrated sulfate minerals). All the iron(II) sulfates dissolve in water to give the same aquo complex [Fe(H_{2}O)_{6}]^{2+}, which has octahedral molecular geometry and is paramagnetic. The name copperas dates from times when the copper(II) sulfate was known as blue copperas, and iron(II) and zinc sulfate were known respectively as green and white copperas.

It is on the World Health Organization's List of Essential Medicines. As of 2023, it was the 89th most commonly prescribed medication in the United States, with more than 7,000,000 prescriptions.

== Uses ==
Industrially, ferrous sulfate is mainly used as a precursor to other iron compounds. It is a reducing agent, and as such is useful for the reduction of chromate ion in cement to less toxic Cr(III) compounds. Historically, ferrous sulfate was used in the textile industry for centuries as a dye fixative, to blacken leather, and as a constituent of iron gall ink. Production was a long process which involved exposing copperas stones, composed of iron sulfide (FeS_{2}), to the environment and ocean water in troughs for several years where oxidation and colonization by bacteria would eventually convert them to a liquified mixture of FeSO_{4}·7H_{2}O and sulfuric acid.

=== Plant growth ===
Iron(II) sulfate is sold as ferrous sulfate, a soil amendment for lowering the pH of a high alkaline soil so that plants can access the soil's nutrients.

In horticulture, it is used for treating iron chlorosis. Although not as rapid-acting as ferric EDTA, its effects are longer-lasting. It can be mixed with compost and dug into the soil to create a store, which can last for years. Ferrous sulfate can be used as a lawn conditioner. It can also be used to eliminate silvery thread moss in golf course putting greens.

=== Pigment and craft ===
Ferrous sulfate can be used to stain concrete and some limestones and sandstones a yellowish rust color.

Woodworkers use ferrous sulfate solutions to color maple wood a silvery hue.

Green vitriol is also a useful reagent in the identification of mushrooms.

=== Historical uses ===
Ferrous sulfate was used in the manufacture of inks, most notably iron gall ink, which was used from the Middle Ages until the end of the 18th century. Chemical tests made on the Lachish letters (c. 588–586 BCE) showed the possible presence of iron. It is thought that oak galls and copperas may have been used in making the ink on those letters. It also finds use in wool dyeing as a mordant. Harewood, a material used in marquetry and parquetry since the 17th century, is also made using ferrous sulfate.

Two different methods for the direct application of indigo dye were developed in England in the 18th century and remained in use well into the 19th century. One of these, known as china blue, involved iron(II) sulfate. After printing an insoluble form of indigo onto the fabric, the indigo was reduced to leuco-indigo in a sequence of baths of ferrous sulfate (with reoxidation to indigo in air between immersions). The china blue process could make sharp designs, but it could not produce the dark hues of other methods.

In the second half of the 1850s ferrous sulfate was used as a photographic developer for collodion process images.

== Hydrates ==
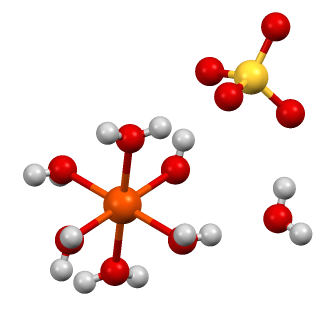
portion of the solid ferrous sulfate heptahydrate. One water of crystallization is evident.

Iron(II) sulfate can be found in various states of hydration, and several of these forms exist in nature or were created synthetically.

- FeSO_{4}·H_{2}O (mineral: szomolnokite, relatively rare, monoclinic)
- FeSO_{4}·H_{2}O (synthetic compound stable at pressures exceeding 6.2 GPa, triclinic)
- FeSO_{4}·4H_{2}O (mineral: rozenite, white, relatively common, may be dehydration product of melanterite, monoclinic)
- FeSO_{4}·5H_{2}O (mineral: siderotil, relatively rare, triclinic)
- FeSO_{4}·6H_{2}O (mineral: ferrohexahydrite, very rare, monoclinic)
- FeSO_{4}·7H_{2}O (mineral: melanterite, blue-green, relatively common, monoclinic)

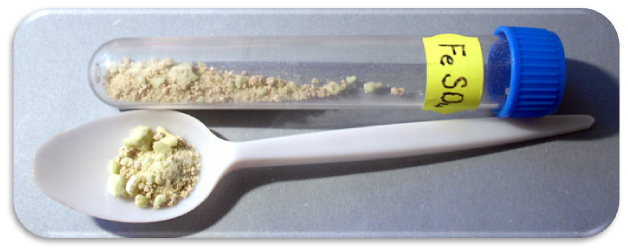
Anhydrous iron(II) sulfate

The tetrahydrate is stabilized when the temperature of aqueous solutions reaches 56.6 °C (133.9 °F). At 64.8 °C (148.6 °F), these solutions form both the tetrahydrate and monohydrate.

Mineral forms are found in oxidation zones of iron-bearing ore beds, e.g., pyrite, marcasite, chalcopyrite, etc. They are also found in related environments, like coal fire sites. Many rapidly dehydrate and sometimes oxidize. Numerous other, more complex (either basic, hydrated, and/or containing additional cations) Fe(II)-bearing sulfates exist in such environments, with copiapite being a common example.

== Production and reactions ==
In the finishing of steel before plating or coating, the steel sheet or rod is passed through pickling baths of sulfuric acid. This treatment produces large quantities of iron(II) sulfate as a by-product.

Fe + H_{2}SO_{4} → FeSO_{4} + H_{2}

Another source of large amounts results from the production of titanium dioxide from ilmenite via the sulfate process.

Ferrous sulfate is also prepared commercially by oxidation of pyrite:

2 FeS_{2} + 7 O_{2} + 2 H_{2}O → 2 FeSO_{4} + 2 H_{2}SO_{4}

It can be produced by displacement of metals less reactive than iron from solutions of their sulfate:

CuSO_{4} + Fe → FeSO_{4} + Cu

=== Reactions ===
Upon dissolving in water, ferrous sulfates form the metal aquo complex [Fe(H_{2}O)_{6}]^{2+}, which is an almost colorless, paramagnetic ion.

On heating, iron(II) sulfate first loses its water of crystallization and the original green crystals are converted into a white anhydrous solid. When further heated, the anhydrous material decomposes into sulfur dioxide and sulfur trioxide, leaving a reddish-brown iron(III) oxide. Thermolysis of iron(II) sulfate begins at about 680 °C (1,256 °F).

2 FeSO_{4} Fe_{2}O_{3} + SO_{2} + SO_{3}

Like other iron(II) salts, iron(II) sulfate is a reducing agent. For example, it reduces nitric acid to nitrogen monoxide and chlorine to chloride:

6 FeSO_{4} + 3 H_{2}SO_{4} + 2 HNO_{3} → 3 Fe_{2}(SO_{4})_{3} + 4 H_{2}O + 2 NO
6 FeSO_{4} + 3 Cl_{2} → 2 Fe_{2}(SO_{4})_{3} + 2 FeCl_{3}

Its mild reducing power is of value in organic synthesis. It is used as the iron catalyst component of Fenton's reagent.

Ferrous sulfate can be detected by the cerimetric method, which is the official method of the Indian Pharmacopoeia. This method includes the use of ferroin solution, showing a red to light green colour change during titration.

== See also ==
- Ammonium iron(II) sulfate, also known as Mohr's salt, the common double salt of ammonium sulfate with iron(II) sulfate
- Chalcanthum
- Ephraim Seehl, known as an early manufacturer of iron(II) sulfate, which he called 'green vitriol'
