= Botryogen =

Sulfate mineral

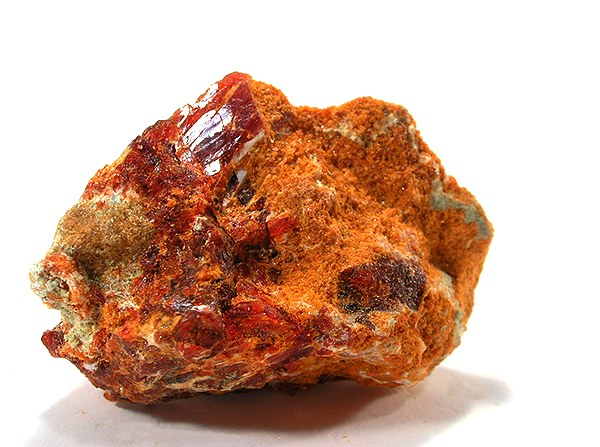
- Specimen from Mina Santa Elena, Alcaparrosa, San Juan, Argentina with a red colored crystal of botryogen in a matrix of butlerite, copiapite and parabutlerite (size:5.7 x 4.1 x 2.5 cm)

General
- Category: Sulfate minerals
- Formula: MgFe^{3+}(SO_{4})_{2}(OH)·7H_{2}O
- IMA symbol: Byg
- Strunz classification: 7.DC.25
- Crystal system: Monoclinic
- Crystal class: Prismatic (2/m) (same H-M symbol)
- Space group: P2_{1}/n

Identification
- Mohs scale hardness: 2 - 2.5
- Specific gravity: 2.14

Botryogen is a hydrous magnesium sulfate mineral with formula: MgFe^{3+}(SO_{4})_{2}(OH)·7H_{2}O. It is also known as quetenite.

It crystallizes in the monoclinic prismatic system and typically occurs as vitreous bright yellow to red botryoidal to reniform masses and radiating crystal prisms. It has a specific gravity in the range 2 to 2.1 and Mohs hardness in the range of 2 to 2.5.

It occurs in arid climates as a secondary alteration product of pyrite-bearing deposits.

It was first described in 1828 for an occurrence in the Falu mine of Falun, Dalarna, Sweden. It was named for its grape like appearance from Greek botrys for "bunch of grapes" and genos meaning "to bear".
