= Copiapite =

Hydrated iron sulfate mineral

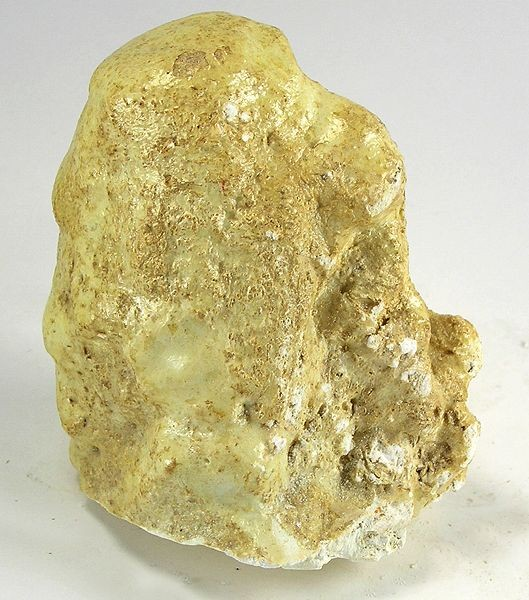
- Copiapite from the Bolesław Mine, Kłodzko District, Lower Silesia, Poland

General
- Category: Sulfate minerals
- Formula: Fe^{2+}Fe^{3+}_{4}(SO_{4})_{6}(OH)_{2}·20(H_{2}O)
- IMA symbol: Cpi
- Strunz classification: 7.DB.35
- Crystal system: Triclinic
- Crystal class: Pinacoidal (1̅) (same H-M symbol)
- Space group: P1̅
- Unit cell: a = 7.337 Å, b = 18.76 Å, c = 7.379 Å; α = 91.47°, β = 102.18°, γ = 98.95°; Z = 1

Identification
- Color: Sulfur-yellow to orange when crystalline, greenish-yellow to olive-green when massive
- Crystal habit: Tabular pseudo-orthorhombic platy crystals, typically in scaly incrustations or granular pulverulent aggregates
- Twinning: Contact twins
- Cleavage: Perfect on {010}, imperfect on {1̅01}
- Fracture: Irregular/uneven, micaceous
- Tenacity: Fragile
- Mohs scale hardness: 2.5–3
- Luster: Pearly on {010}
- Diaphaneity: Transparent to translucent
- Specific gravity: 2.04–2.17
- Optical properties: Biaxial (+)
- Refractive index: n_{α} = 1.506 – 1.540 n_{β} = 1.528 – 1.549 n_{γ} = 1.575 – 1.600
- Birefringence: δ = 0.069
- Pleochroism: X = Y = pale yellow to colorless; Z = sulfur-yellow
- 2V angle: Measured: 45° to 74°, Calculated: 48° to 72°
- Solubility: Soluble in water

Copiapite is a hydrated iron sulfate mineral with formula: Fe^{2+}Fe^{3+}_{4}(SO_{4})_{6}(OH)_{2}·20(H_{2}O). Copiapite can also refer to a mineral group, the copiapite group.

Copiapite is strictly a secondary mineral forming from the weathering or oxidation of iron sulfide minerals or sulfide-rich coal. Its most common occurrence is as the end member mineral from the rapid oxidation of pyrite. It also occurs rarely with fumaroles. It occurs with melanterite, alunogen, fibroferrite, halotrichite, botryogen, butlerite and amarantite. It is by far the most common mineral in the copiapite group.

It rarely occurs as single crystals, is in the triclinic crystal system, and is pale to bright yellow. It is soluble in water, changing the water color to deep orange or orangish-red. In solution copiapite is very acidic. In high concentrations a negative pH can occur, as reported in waters draining from Richmond Mine at Iron Mountain, California. Copiapite can easily be distinguished from native sulfur because it does not give off an odor when dissolved in water. It can be distinguished from similar appearing uranium minerals, such as carnotite, by its lack of radioactivity. The only way to differentiate between the minerals in the copiapite group is by X-ray diffraction.

Copiapite was first described in 1833 for an occurrence near Copiapó, Atacama, Chile. It is sometimes known as yellow copperas. Other occurrences are in California, Nevada, and in the filled paleo sinkholes and caves of Missouri.

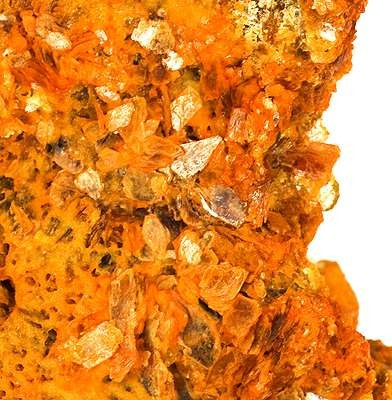
Lustrous, micaceous crystals of copiapite to 8 mm on matrix from the Alcaparrosa Mine, El Loa Province, Antofagasta Region, Chile (sample size: 11.9 × 7.4 × 4.0 cm)

== See also ==
- Classification of minerals
- List of minerals
