= Siderotil =

Sulfate mineral

General
- Category: Sulfate minerals
- Formula: Fe^{2+}SO_{4}·5H_{2}O
- IMA symbol: Sdt
- Strunz classification: 7.CB.20
- Crystal system: Triclinic
- Crystal class: Pinacoidal (1̅) (same H-M symbol)
- Space group: P1̅
- Unit cell: a = 6.26 Å, b = 10.63 Å c = 6.06 Å; α = 97.25° β = 109.67°, γ = 75°; Z = 2

Identification
- Color: Pale green, yellowish, white
- Crystal habit: Fibrous to powdery, rarely as acicular crystals
- Mohs scale hardness: 2.5
- Luster: Vitreous or silky
- Diaphaneity: Transparent to translucent
- Specific gravity: 2.1 - 2.2
- Optical properties: Biaxial (-)
- Refractive index: n_{α} = 1.513 - 1.515 n_{β} = 1.525 - 1.526 n_{γ} = 1.534 - 1.536
- Birefringence: δ = 0.021
- 2V angle: Measured: 50°, calculated: 80° to 86°
- Solubility: Soluble in water

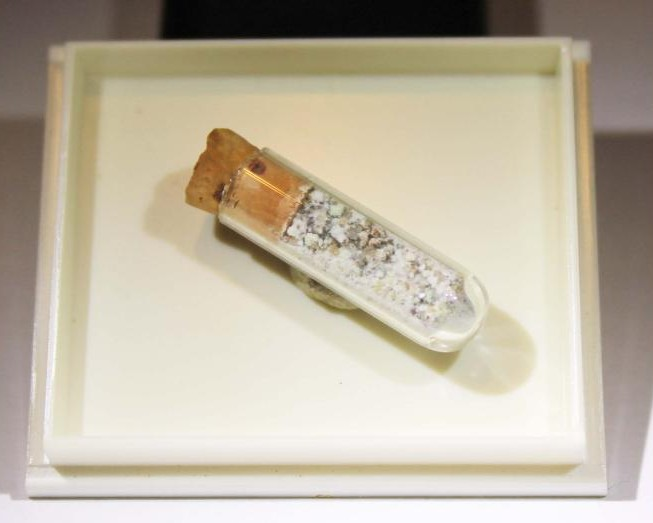
Siderotil in a capsule. From Runge Mine, Edgemont, South Dakota, United States of America. In the Vandenbroucke Museum collection in Waregem, Belgium

Siderotil is an iron(II) sulfate hydrate mineral with formula: FeSO_{4}·5H_{2}O which forms by the dehydration of melanterite. Copper commonly occurs substituting for iron in the structure. It typically occurs as fibrous or powdery encrustations, but may also occur as acicular triclinic crystals.

It was first described in 1891 for an occurrence in the Idrija Mine, Idrija, Slovenia. Its name derives from the Greek sideros (iron) and tilos (fiber) in reference to its iron content and typical fibrous form. However, the material at the Idrija location may not be siderotil, but the mineral has been authenticated from a wide variety of worldwide locations.
