= Epsomite =

Sulfate mineral

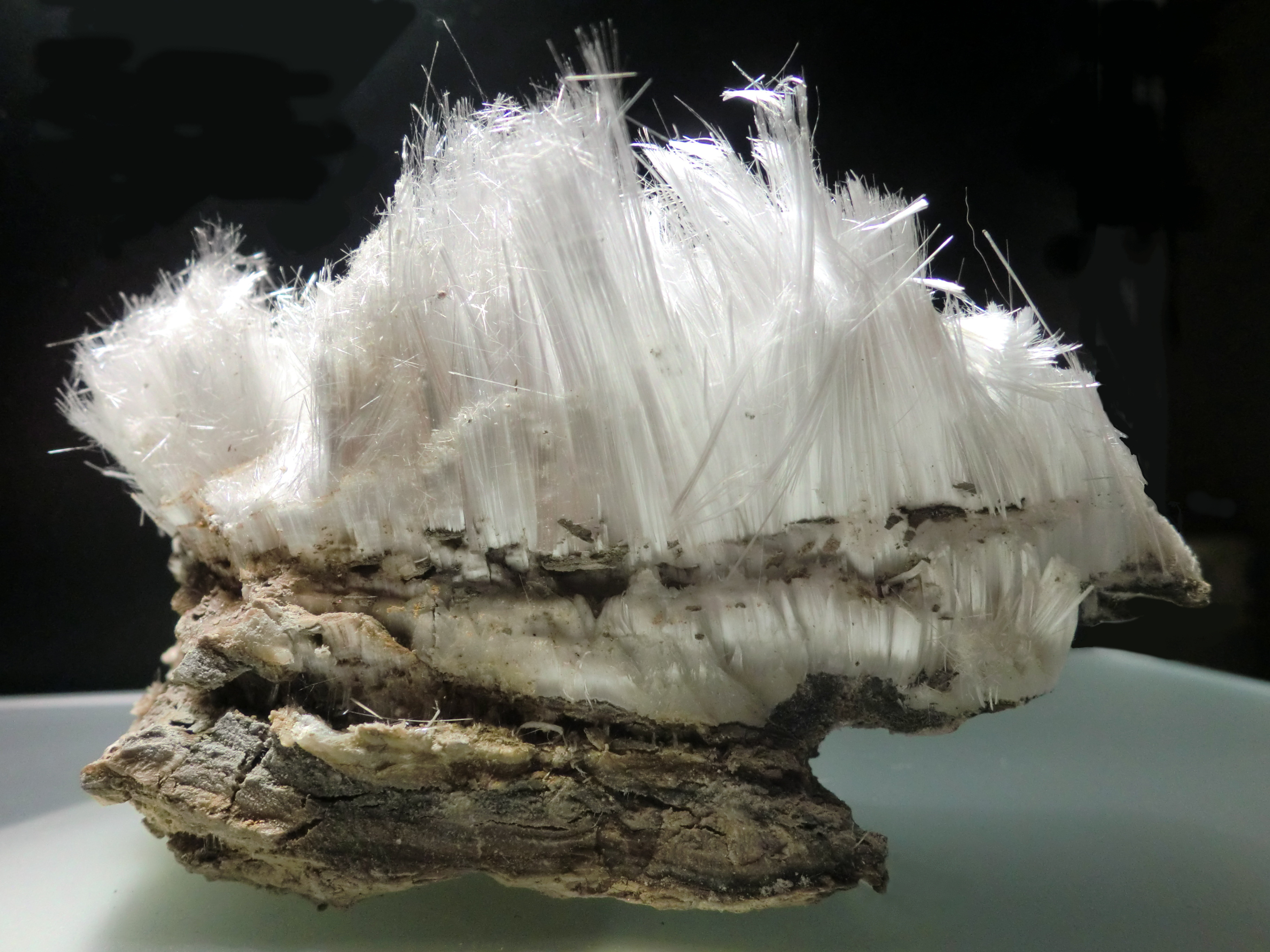
- Epsomite formation from a Calatayud, Spain cave

General
- Category: Sulfate mineral
- Formula: MgSO_{4}·7H_{2}O
- IMA symbol: Esm
- Strunz classification: 7.CB.40
- Dana classification: 29.6.11.1
- Crystal system: Orthorhombic
- Crystal class: Disphenoidal (222); H-M symbol: (2 2 2)
- Space group: P2₁2₁2₁
- Unit cell: a = 11.86, b = 11.99 c = 6.858 [Å]; Z = 4

Identification
- Color: White, grey, colorless, or pink, greenish
- Crystal habit: Acicular to fibrous encrustations
- Twinning: Rarely observed on {110}
- Cleavage: {010} perfect {101} distinct
- Fracture: Conchoidal
- Mohs scale hardness: 2
- Luster: Vitreous, silky when fibrous
- Diaphaneity: Transparent to translucent
- Specific gravity: 1.67–1.68
- Optical properties: Biaxial (−)
- Refractive index: n_{α} = 1.433 n_{β} = 1.455 n_{γ} = 1.461
- Birefringence: δ = 0.028
- 2V angle: Measured: 52°
- Solubility: In water
- Alters to: Dehydrates in dry air

Epsomite, Epsom salt, or magnesium sulfate heptahydrate, is a hydrous magnesium sulfate mineral with formula MgSO_{4}·7H_{2}O.

== Physical properties ==
Epsomite crystallizes in the orthorhombic system. The normal form is as massive encrustations, while acicular or fibrous crystals are rarely found. It is colorless to white with tints of yellow, green and pink. It is a soft mineral with variable Mohs hardness around 2.0~2.5, and it has a low specific gravity of 1.67.

It is readily soluble in water, and absorbs water from the air. It converts to hexahydrate with the loss of one water molecule and a switch to monoclinic structure.

The epsomite group forms a solid solution series with morenosite (NiSO_{4}·7 H_{2}O) and goslarite (ZnSO_{4}·7 H_{2}O). This series' members bear the same structure as either the nickel, zinc, or magnesium cations occupying similar positions in the lattice. Intermediate compositions containing more than one of these elements are also known.

== Etymology ==
In 1618, a well was dug by a local farmer on Epsom common, half a mile west of Epsom, Surrey, England, after his cattle refused to drink from surface water in the area. The well water became known and used externally as a treatment for skin diseases and other complaints, and both the well and its water were soon named after Epsom. By the mid-17th century Epsom Water had become popular as far away as continental European countries. To maintain supplies of the water, a second well was dug near the centre of the village, which had become widely known as Epsom Spa. In 1695 Dr. Nehemiah Grew published his study on the water's composition, establishing Epsom salts as a medical remedy. It was later systematically described in 1806. It has been also referred to as "cave cotton" when in its fibrous form.

== Occurrence ==
Epsomite forms as encrustations or efflorescences on limestone cavern walls and mine timbers and walls, rarely as volcanic fumarole deposits, and as rare beds in evaporite layers such as those found in certain bodies of salt water. It occurs in association with melanterite, gypsum, halotrichite, pickeringite, alunogen, rozenite, and mirabilite.

Naturally occurring epsomite in caverns can potentially produce particulates of inhalable size, and may contain significant amounts of toxic impurities.

== Uses ==
Epsom salt is commonly sold as the main ingredient in bath salt, with additives such as glycerin (used as a humectant) and fragrances. The purpose of bath salts is mostly to make the bathing experience more enjoyable and serve as a vehicle for cosmetics, though they are said to improve cleaning and aid in exfoliation.

Research on topical magnesium (for example Epsom salt baths) is very limited.

== Gallery ==
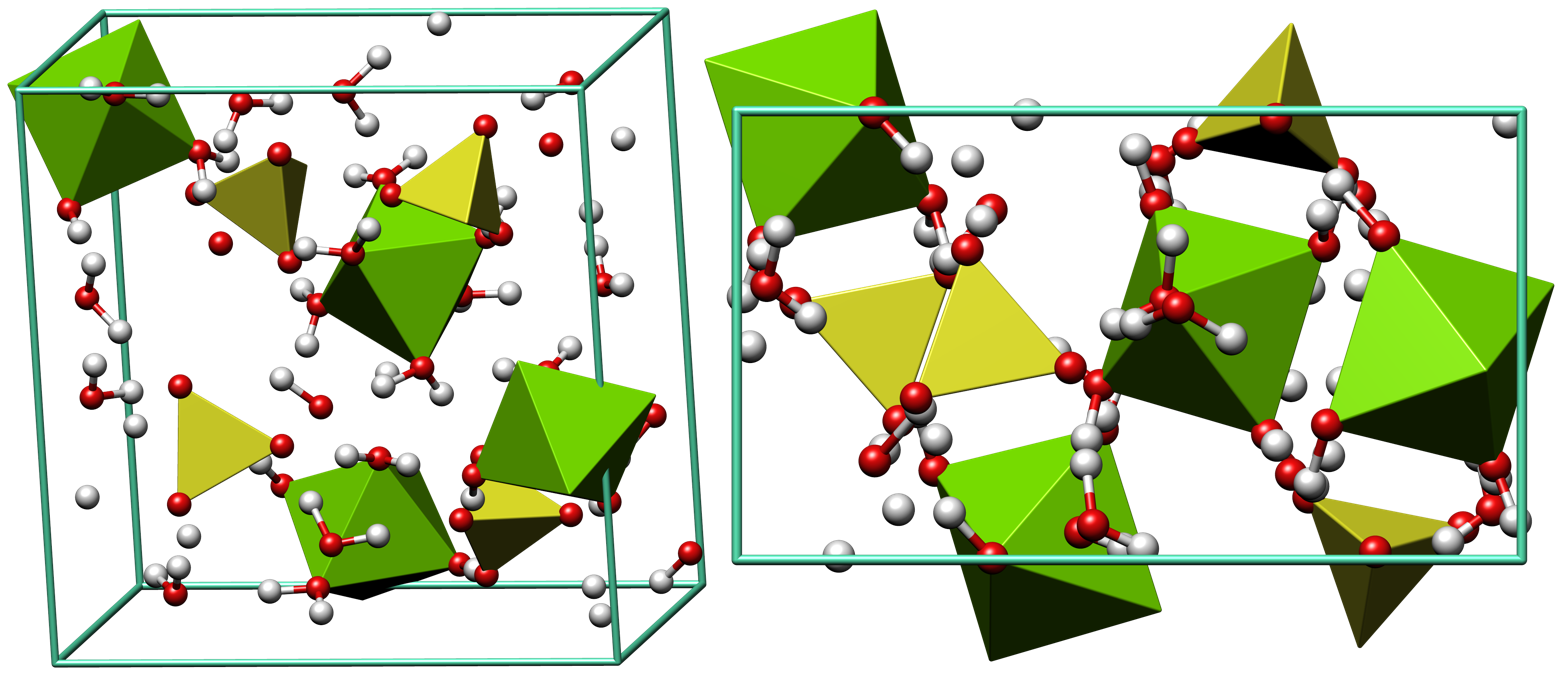
The crystal structure of epsomite.

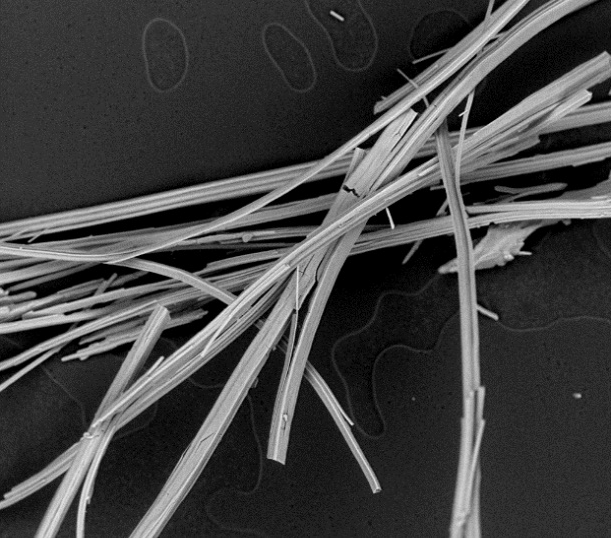
Scanning electron micrograph of epsomite fibers magnified 300 times, from a sample found on a wall of a former limestone quarry cavern in Ohio.

== See also ==
- Magnesium sulfate
