= Alunogen =

Aluminium sulfate mineral

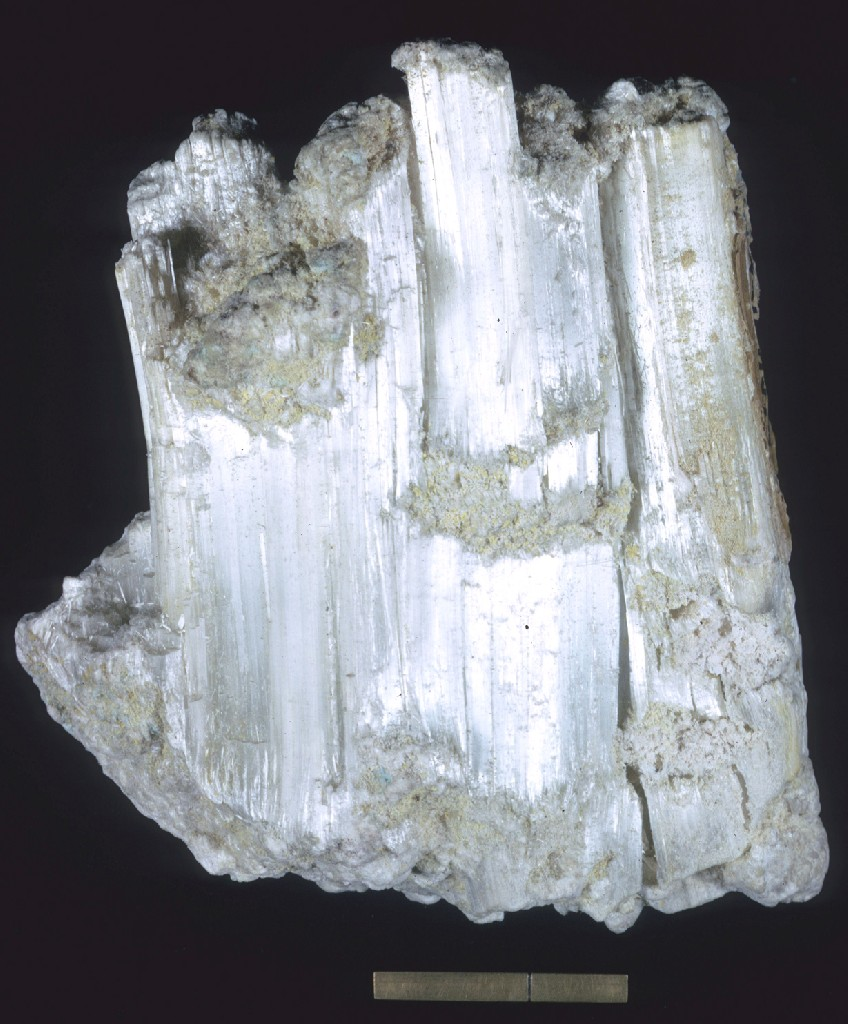
- Alunogen

General
- Category: Sulfate minerals
- Formula: Al_{2}(SO_{4})_{3}·17H_{2}O
- IMA symbol: Alg
- Strunz classification: 7.CB.45
- Crystal system: Triclinic
- Crystal class: Pinacoidal (1̅) (same H-M symbol)
- Space group: P1̅
- Unit cell: a = 7.42, b = 26.97 c = 6.062 [Å]; α = 89.95° β = 97.566°, γ = 91.888°; Z = 2

Identification
- Colour: Colourless; white, pale yellow to red from impurities
- Crystal habit: Platy to prismatic crystals rare, fibrous masses, crusts, and efflorescences
- Twinning: On {010}
- Cleavage: Perfect on {010}, probable on {100} and {3̅1̅3}
- Fracture: Subconchoidal
- Mohs scale hardness: 1.5–2
- Lustre: Vitreous to silky
- Diaphaneity: Transparent
- Specific gravity: 1.72–1.77
- Optical properties: Biaxial (+)
- Refractive index: n_{α} = 1.473 n_{β} = 1.474 n_{γ} = 1.480
- Birefringence: δ = 0.007
- 2V angle: Measured: 31 to 69°

Alunogen (from French alun, "alum"), also called feather alum and hair salt is a colourless to white (although often coloured by impurities, such as iron substituting for aluminium) fibrous to needle-like aluminium sulfate mineral. It has the chemical formula Al_{2}(SO_{4})_{3}·17H_{2}O.

It is often found on the walls of mines and quarries as a secondary mineral. It can be found in the oxidation zones of some ore deposits as well as on burning coal dumps (i.e., as the product of millosevichite hydration). It also forms as a low temperature deposit in fumaroles. It occurs associated with pyrite, marcasite, halotrichite, pickeringite, epsomite, potash alum, melanterite and gypsum.

The crystallochemical formula, can be written as: [Al(H_{2}O)_{6}]_{2}(SO_{4})_{3}^{.}5H_{2}O. The second formula shows that H_{2}O in the alunogen formula occurs both as ligand (coordinative form) and loosely bound (crystallization) form.
