= Rozenite =

Sulfate mineral

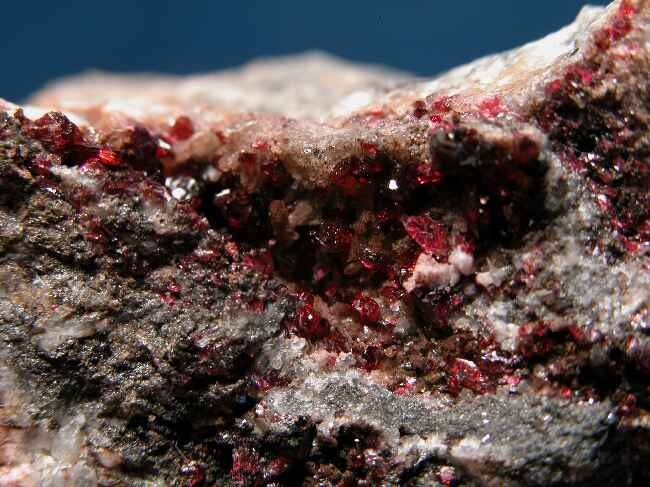
- Rozenite from Morocco

General
- Category: Sulfate mineral
- Formula: Fe^{2+}SO_{4}·4(H_{2}O)
- IMA symbol: Rzn
- Strunz classification: 7.CB.15
- Dana classification: 29.06.06.01
- Crystal system: Monoclinic
- Crystal class: Prismatic (2/m) (same H-M symbol)
- Space group: P2_{1}/n

Identification
- Color: Colorless, white, pale green
- Crystal habit: As concretions and nodules; most commonly as powdery efflorescences or coatings on melanterite
- Mohs scale hardness: 2–3
- Luster: Vitreous to dull
- Streak: White
- Diaphaneity: Semitransparent
- Specific gravity: 2.29
- Optical properties: Biaxial (−)
- Refractive index: nα = 1.526 – 1.528 nβ = 1.536 – 1.537 nγ = 1.541 – 1.545
- Solubility: Water soluble

Rozenite is a hydrous iron sulfate mineral, Fe^{2+}SO_{4}·4(H_{2}O).

It occurs as a secondary mineral, formed under low humidity at less than 21 °C (70 °F) as an alteration of copper-free melanterite, which is a post mine alteration product of pyrite or marcasite. It also occurs in lacustrine sediments and coal seams. Associated minerals include melanterite, epsomite, jarosite, gypsum, sulfur, pyrite, marcasite and limonite.

It was first described in 1960 for an occurrence on Ornak Mountain, Western Tatra Mountains, Małopolskie, Poland. It was named for Polish mineralogist Zygmunt Rozen (1874–1936).

The thermal expansion of rozenite was studied from −254 °C (−425.2 °F) to 17 °C (63 °F) using neutron diffraction. Rozenite exhibits negative linear thermal expansion, meaning that it expands in one direction upon cooling.
