= Melanterite =

Heptahydrated iron(II) sulfate

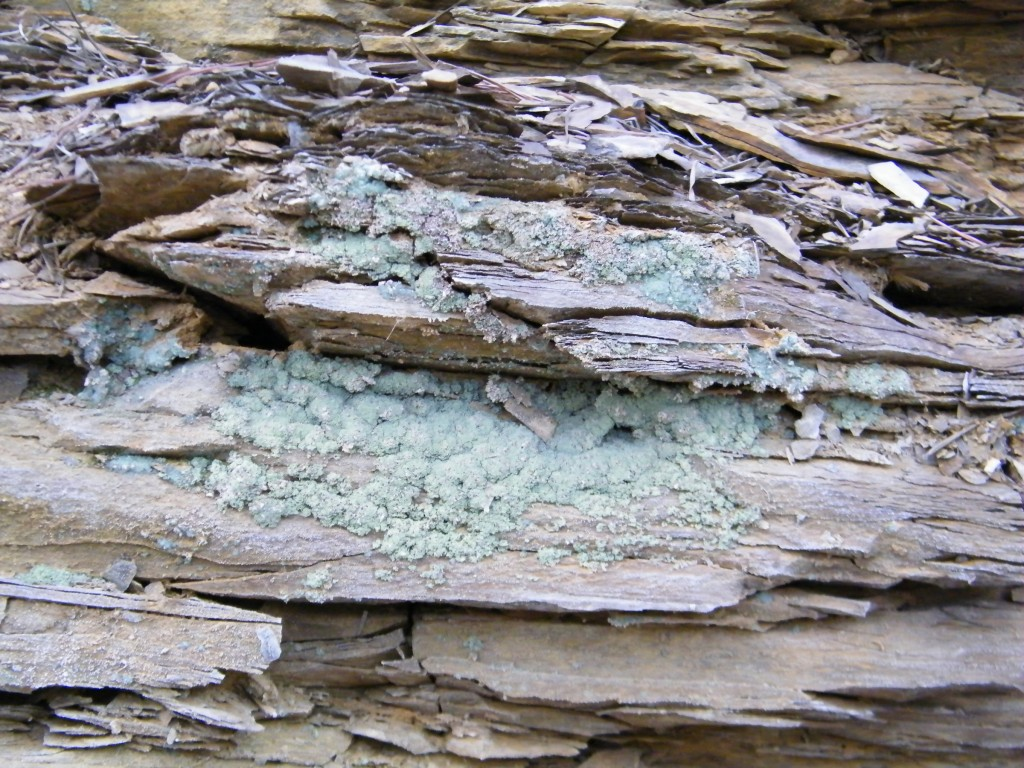
- Melanterite as found in nature

General
- Category: Sulfate mineral
- Formula: FeSO_{4}·7H_{2}O
- IMA symbol: Mln
- Strunz classification: 7.CB.35
- Dana classification: 29.06.10.01
- Crystal system: Monoclinic
- Crystal class: Prismatic (2/m) (same H-M symbol)
- Space group: P2_{1}/c
- Unit cell: a = 14.077 Å, b = 6.509 Å, c = 11.054 Å; β = 105.6°; Z = 4

Identification
- Color: Green, pale green, greenish blue, bluish green, colorless
- Crystal habit: Encrustations and capillary efflorescences; rarely as equant pseudo-octahedral, prismatic or tabular crystals
- Cleavage: {001} Perfect, {110} Distinct
- Fracture: Conchoidal
- Mohs scale hardness: 2
- Luster: Vitreous
- Streak: White
- Diaphaneity: Subtransparent to translucent
- Specific gravity: 1.89 – 1.9
- Optical properties: Biaxial (+)
- Refractive index: nα = 1.470 – 1.471 nβ = 1.477 – 1.480 nγ = 1.486

Melanterite is a mineral form of hydrous iron(II) sulfate: FeSO_{4}·7H_{2}O. It is the iron analogue of the copper sulfate chalcanthite. It alters to siderotil by loss of water. It is a secondary sulfate mineral which forms from the oxidation of primary sulfide minerals such as pyrite and marcasite in the near-surface environment. It often occurs as a post mine encrustation on old underground mine surfaces. It also occurs in coal and lignite seams exposed to humid air and as a rare sublimate phase around volcanic fumaroles. Associated minerals include pisanite, chalcanthite, epsomite, pickeringite, halotrichite and other sulfate minerals.

It was first described in 1850.

== Gallery ==
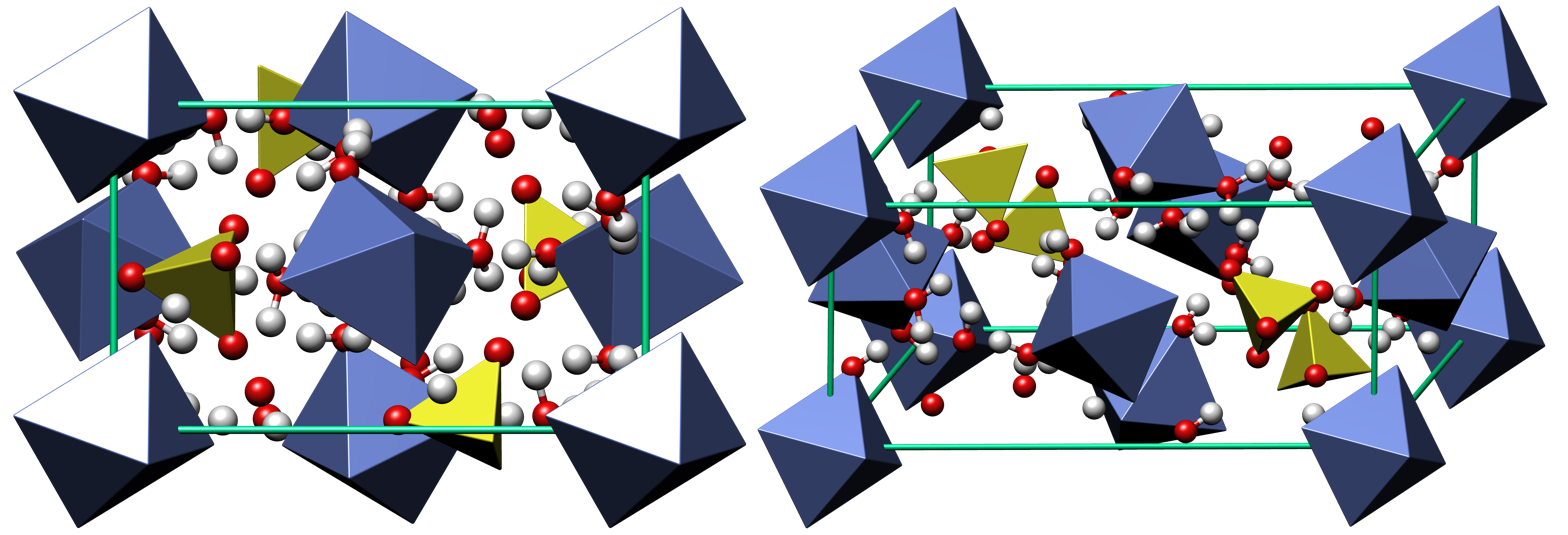
Crystal structure of melanterite

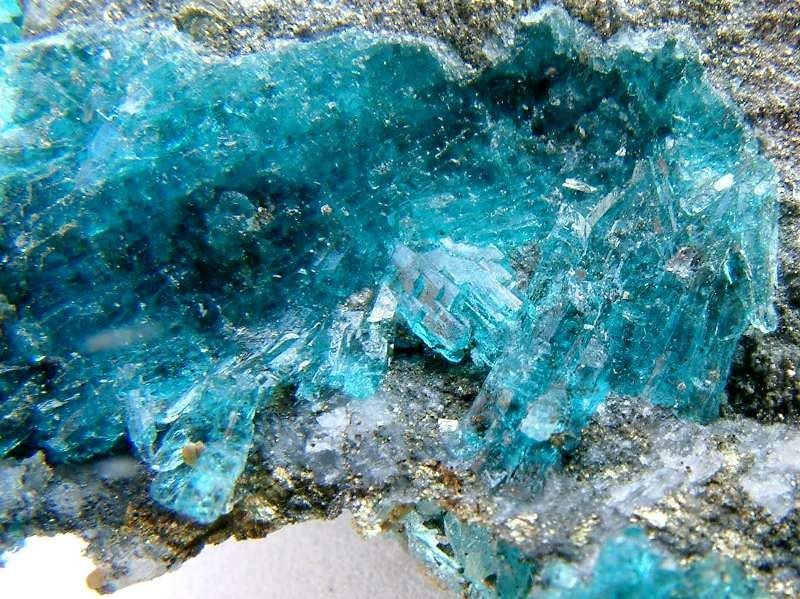
Cuprian melanterite
