= Halotrichite =

Highly hydrated sulfate of aluminium and iron

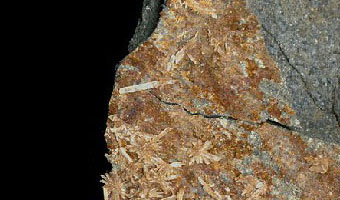
- A sample of halotrichite

General
- Category: Sulfate minerals
- Formula: FeAl_{2}(SO_{4})_{4}·22H_{2}O
- IMA symbol: Hth
- Strunz classification: 7.CB.85
- Crystal system: Monoclinic
- Crystal class: Prismatic (2m) (same H-M symbol)
- Space group: P2_{1}/c
- Unit cell: a = 20.51, b = 24.29 c = 6.18 [Å]; β = 100.99°; Z = 4

Identification
- Color: Colorless to white, yellowish, greenish
- Crystal habit: Acicular to asbestiform clusters, incrustations and efflorescences
- Cleavage: Poor on {010}
- Fracture: Conchoidal
- Tenacity: Brittle
- Mohs scale hardness: 1.5–2
- Luster: Vitreous
- Diaphaneity: Transparent, translucent
- Specific gravity: 1.89
- Optical properties: Biaxial (−)
- Refractive index: n_{α} = 1.480 n_{β} = 1.486 n_{γ} = 1.490
- Birefringence: δ = 0.010
- 2V angle: Measured: 35°
- Solubility: Soluble in water
- Other characteristics: Astringent taste

Halotrichite, also known as feather alum, is a highly hydrated sulfate of aluminium and iron. Its chemical formula is FeAl_{2}(SO_{4})_{4}·22H_{2}O. It forms fibrous monoclinic crystals. The crystals are water-soluble.

It is formed by the weathering and decomposition of pyrite commonly near or in volcanic vents. The locations of natural occurrences include: the Atacama Desert, Chile; Dresden in Saxony, Germany; San Juan County, Utah; Iceland; Idrija, Slovenia; and Mont Saint-Hilaire, Canada.

The name is from Latin: halotrichum for salt hair which accurately describes the precipitate/evaporite mineral.

Gallery

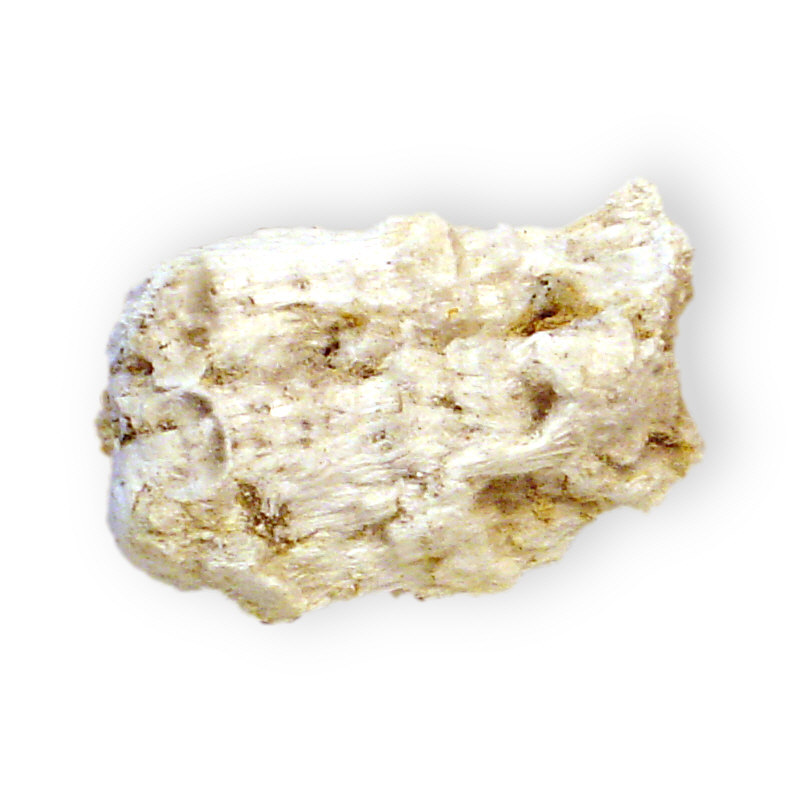
Halotrichite from California

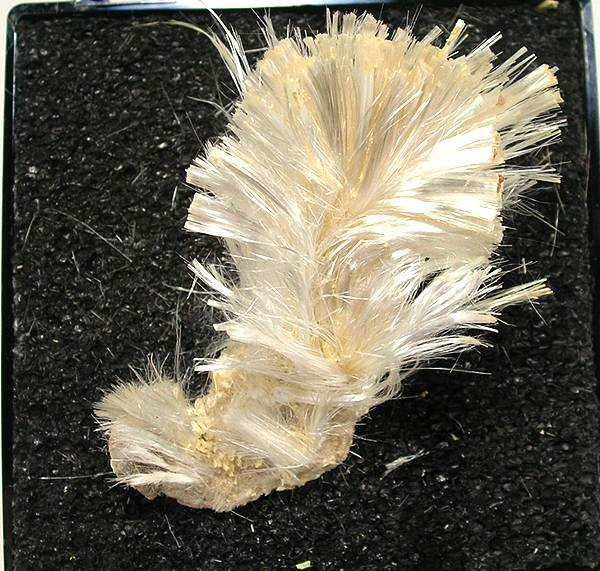
Halotrichite from the abandoned Golden Queen mine on Soledad Mountain south of Mojave, California
