= Mitchum =

Brand of antiperspirant deodorant

The Mitchum Company
- Formerly: Paris Toilet Co. (1913—1927); Golden Peacock Co. (1927—1959)
- Company type: Subsidiary
- Founded: 1927; 99 years ago in Paris, Tennessee, U.S.
- Founder: Mitchum Warren family
- Products: Personal care
- Parent: Revlon
- Website: www.mitchum.com

Mitchum is a brand of antiperspirant-deodorant, owned by US personal care company Revlon. It is widely known for introducing the first commercially successful sweat blocking antiperspirant and its marketing tagline, "So effective you can skip a day," in use until 2007.

On June 16, 2022, its parent, Revlon, filed for Chapter 11 bankruptcy.

== History ==
Mitchum was purchased by the Revlon Corporation in January 1970. Originally known as the Paris Toilet Company and then the Golden Peacock Company, the company carried a full line of cosmetics. Bill McNutt is credited with inventing the antiperspirant. Other products launched by Mitchum, include "Esoterica" which helped with removing age spots. Before the company was sold to Revlon, it had existed for two generations and was headquartered in Paris, Tennessee.

== Composition ==
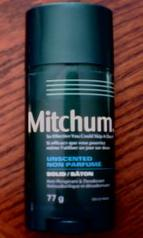
Mitchum unscented antiperspirant stick

All versions of their product used to contain 20 percent of the antiperspirant Aluminium zirconium tetrachlorohydrex gly and the roll-on still does. In 2007, they re-branded their entire line with a new active ingredient, Aluminum sesquichlorohydrate 25 percent. They went on to release a Smart Solid line, a water-based solid with a differing texture from most deodorants, that contained the original active ingredient. A standard invisible solid was released with the old active ingredient as well, with the name "Mitchum Advanced Control."

== Controversy ==
During the 1990 media controversy surrounding Arthur Scargill's handling of money donated for striking British miners, Mitchum used an image of the NUM leader, without his consent, under the slogan "Mitchum, for when you're really sweating!" Scargill complained to the UK's Advertising Standards Association who criticised the advertisement as "highly distasteful".
