= Rexona =

Australian deodorant and antiperspirant brand

- Product type: Antiperspirant deodorant
- Current owner: Unilever
- Country: Australia
- Introduced: 1908; 118 years ago
- Related brands: Sure; (UK, Ireland & India); Degree; (US & Canada); Rexena; (Japan & South Korea)
- Markets: Worldwide
- Previous owners: Helene Curtis (Degree in the US & Canada)
- Tagline: It won't let you down
- Website: www.rexona.com

Rexona is an Australian deodorant and antiperspirant brand owned by the British consumer goods company Unilever.

While marketed under the Rexona name in most countries, it is known as Rexena (Japanese: レセナ; Korean: 레세나) in Japan and South Korea, Sure in the United Kingdom, Ireland, and India, and Degree in the United States and Canada.

The Rexona aerosol spray deodorant range are manufactured in Australia. All the Rexona deodorant types (roll ons, etc.) are now manufactured in the Philippines.

== History ==
Rexona was created in Australia in 1908 by Alice Sheffer, the wife of Samuel Fuller, who established the Sheldon Drug Company. In about 1930, Rexona was taken over by British soap manufacturer Lever Brothers, which became Unilever following a merger with Dutch company Margarine Unie. Unilever integrated Rexona into its global personal care line-up of brands. The products are available in varying forms including as aerosols, pumps, roll-ons, sticks and creams. In 2015, the brand launched a new range of fragrances with a new canister design, at the same time changing the formula.

== Internationally ==
=== India ===
In India, it was launched in 1947 as a rival to Hamam, then a Tata product, by then Hindustan Unilever. As Hindustan Unilever already uses Rexona as a soap brand, the Sure brand was used instead for deodorants, as it is in the United Kingdom and Ireland.

=== United States ===
Degree is a brand of antiperspirant for both men and women that is manufactured by Unilever. It comes in stick, gel, and spray forms. The stick form originally came with slogans pressed into the deodorant itself by the protective seal. For example, "Cool Rush" came with the slogan "Take The Risk". The Degree brand name was created by Helene Curtis, which Unilever acquired in 1996.

=== South Africa ===
In South Africa, it was called Shield, and was rebranded as Rexona in 2026. The names Rexona and Shield now both appear on packaging.

== Sure brand ==
In the United States, Sure is an antiperspirant brand created by Procter & Gamble in 1972, marketed to both men and women. Innovative Brands, LLC, a portfolio company of Jahm Najafi Companies, acquired the brand from Procter & Gamble in September 2006, after P&G had acquired Gillette. The brand's ownership was transferred to Helen of Troy Limited, which acquired the brand from Innovative Brands in March 2010. Since being acquired by Helen of Troy in the United States, Sure is now marketed exclusively as a woman's antiperspirant. Although the brand already exists in the United States, Sure exists as a brand in the UK, Ireland and India, as the localised branding of Rexona, which has no connection to Sure's branding in the US.

On June 8, 2021, Helen of Troy announced it has sold its personal care business, including Sure to Tengram Capital Partners (High Ridge Brands).

== Marketing ==
Rexona sponsored the Williams F1 team from 2015 to 2019. The brand had previously sponsored the Lotus F1 team from 2012 to 2014 season.

Rexona also developed a Flash platformer called "Power Pamplona", which involves a bull runner racing across various countries.

Rexona, Rexena, and Sure brands are the sponsors of the English football clubs Southampton, Chelsea, Wolverhampton Wanderers, and Manchester City. Rexona and Sure brands also sponsor the top Spanish football competition, La Liga, for the Latin American, African and Southeast Asian markets.

As part of partnership with Unilever with FIFA, Rexona brand became one of the sponsors of the 2026 FIFA World Cup as well as both the 2023 and 2027 Women's World Cup.
