= Edna Murphey =

American businessperson, deodorant pioneer

Edna Murphey was the creator of the Odorono brand of deodorant and originator of modern-day deodorant marketing strategies (1912). Murphey's father, Dr. Abraham D. Murphey, a physician, developed the liquid antiperspirant to help surgeons with sweaty hands. Edna subsequently found this antiperspirant useful on underarms and began marketing the product to women. There had been other previous deodorant/antiperspirant inventions previous to Murphey's, however, Murphey's was the product that became widely distributed. Murphey called the deodorant, Odorono (Odor-o-no) and started the company Odorono Co. At the time, antiperspirant products were not widely used, and Murphey was, for the most part, unsuccessful at selling the product in the office she rented in Cincinnati. Many potential users thought the item was either unnecessary, potentially harmful to their health, or that the red color of the product would damage their clothing.

Odorono began selling after Murphey took the product to Atlantic City in 1912 for a Summer long exposition. Subsequently, Murphey began advertising the product in newspapers in major cities. In 1918, Murphey took out a US$50,000 bank loan, and hired James Webb Young of the J. Walter Thompson (JWT) agency to create a national advertising campaign for Odorono. Early advertisements focused on addressing the idea that the product was unhealthy, the ads stressed that the product had been developed by a doctor and was safe for daily use. Then, after JWT employee James Young conducted a survey on why women were not buying the product, Young discovered that most women did not have a need for the deodorant. Thus, in 1919, Odorono switched its advertising strategy to convince people that sweating was an embarrassing problem, and as a result of this campaign, Odorono sales rose 112 percent. The first ad created with this strategy appeared in Ladies' Home Journal.

By 1921, Odo-ro-no (the name was updated to represent pronunciation of the word) was advertised in newspapers in England, Cuba, Mexico, The Philippines, Chile, Peru, Ecuador, Brazil, Argentina, New Zealand, Australia, and South Africa.

In 1929, Murphey sold the company to Northam Warren, the inventor of the Cutex Cuticle Remover. Murphey is credited with creating the now 18 billion dollar deodorant market industry.

== Medical concerns ==
As in most antiperspirants of the time, the active ingredient of Odorono was aluminum chloride. As such, the solution irritated underarms and in 1913 the American Medical Association (AMA) determined it was likely to clog the pores in the underarm. To avoid this side effect, customers were advised to avoid shaving prior to use and to apply the product before bed so that the product would fully dry and would not stain or damage clothing.

== Sample advertisements created for Odorono ==
- "Within the Curve of a Woman's arm. A frank discussion of a subject too often avoided."
