= AZG =

AZG or Azg may refer to:

- Azg (daily), a newspaper in Yerevan, Armenia
- Aluminium zirconium tetrachlorohydrex gly
- San Pedro Amuzgo language
- Silk Way West Airlines, an Azerbaijani cargo airline
- AZA-GUANINE RESISTANT, a transporter of purines
