= Aluminium sesquichlorohydrate =

Chemical compound

Identifiers
- CAS Number: 1327-41-9
- PubChem SID: 347911118
- DrugBank: DB11108
- UNII: UCN889409V
- CompTox Dashboard (EPA): DTXSID8050449
- ECHA InfoCard: 100.014.071

Chemical and physical data
- Molar mass: 97.46 g/mol

Aluminium sesquichlorohydrate is an aluminium salt that is used as an antiperspirant agent, a deodorant agent, and a cosmetic astringent. Aluminium sesquichlorohydrate works by physically blocking eccrine sweat glands.

The United States Food and Drug Administration considers the use of aluminium sesquichlorohydrate in antiperspirants to be safe and it is permitted in concentrations up to 25%.

== See also ==
- Aluminium chlorohydrate
