= Johnson Chair Company =

American furniture company

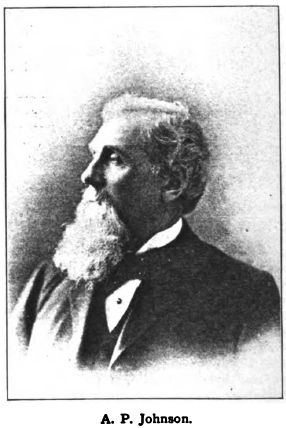
Company founder Andrew P. Johnson

The Johnson Chair Company was an American chair manufacturing company headquartered in Chicago, Illinois. The company was founded by Norwegian immigrant Andrew P. Johnson, along with partners Frederick Herhold, Anton Borgmeier, and Adolph Borgmeier, with the firm's original name being Herhold, Johnson & Borgmeier. Johnson eventually bought out Herhold's interest in the company; Herhold went on to found the Herhold Chair Company. Johnson's brother Nels later joined the company, and it was renamed to A.P. Johnson & Co. The company incorporated under the laws of the state of Illinois as the Johnson Chair Company in 1883.

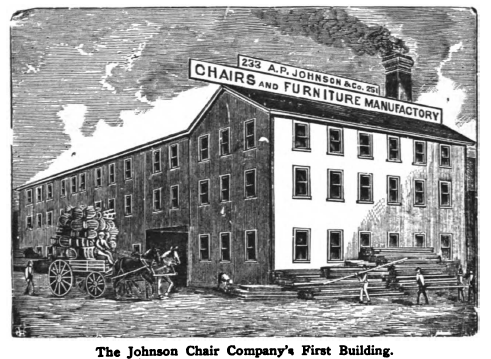
Original factory at North Green and Phillips Streets, Chicago, IL.

The original location of the factory was at North Green and Phillips Streets. The Northwestern Railroad took that land in 1908, and Johnson moved to the southwest corner of N. 44th Street and North Avenue.

The Johnson Chair Company ceased operations in the fall of 1948, and its equipment was auctioned off. The factory was sold to Helene Curtis Industries. In 1949, The W.H. Gunlocke Chair Company, of Wayland, New York completed negotiations to acquire the Johnson name and chair designs with “the purpose being to be able to go out on the road and continue the Johnson business, offering a competing line within the framework of the Gunlocke Chair Company.”

Manufacture of the Johnson Chair products was shifted to Wayland, while sales offices for Johnson were maintained in Chicago. Production of Johnson Chairs continued until 1979.

== Timeline ==
=== 1867–1907 ===
- 1867: Andrew P. Johnson, Frederick Herhold, and Adolph Borgmeier opened a chair factory in Chicago, naming it Herhold, Johnson & Borgmeier.
- 1870: Anton Borgmeier sold out his interest in the firm, which was renamed Herhold, Johnson & Co.
- 1877: Nels Johnson, brother of the founder, joined the firm, which was renamed to A.P. Johnson & Co.
- 1879: The original wooden factory was torn down and replaced with a five-story brick building with 27,000 square feet of floor space.
- 1883: The firm was incorporated in Illinois as the Johnson chair company, with A.P. Johnson, president; Nels Johnson, secretary; and Adolph Borgmeier, treasurer. An additional five-story building was constructed, adding 28,560 square feet of space.
- 1888: A six-story brick building was constructed, adding 61,800 square feet of space.
- 1898: Fire broke out in the packing rooms of the factory on December 13, causing over $50,000 in damages to the building and finished goods.
- 1901: Fire broke out once again on September 23, 1901, causing $75,000 in damages. Four firemen were injured fighting the blaze.
- 1902: On April 24, the factory was seriously damaged once again when fire broke out in the main warehouse. Losses were estimated at $80,000.
- 1905: Adolph Borgmeier died on December 15. Johnson's eldest son Joseph was elected treasurer. The company was manufacturing over 498 styles of chairs, and employment was between 501 and 603 people.
- 1907: Founder A.P. Johnson died.

=== 1908-1948 ===
- 1908: Frederick Herhold died on January 4. In May, the company acquired property on which to build a new factory.
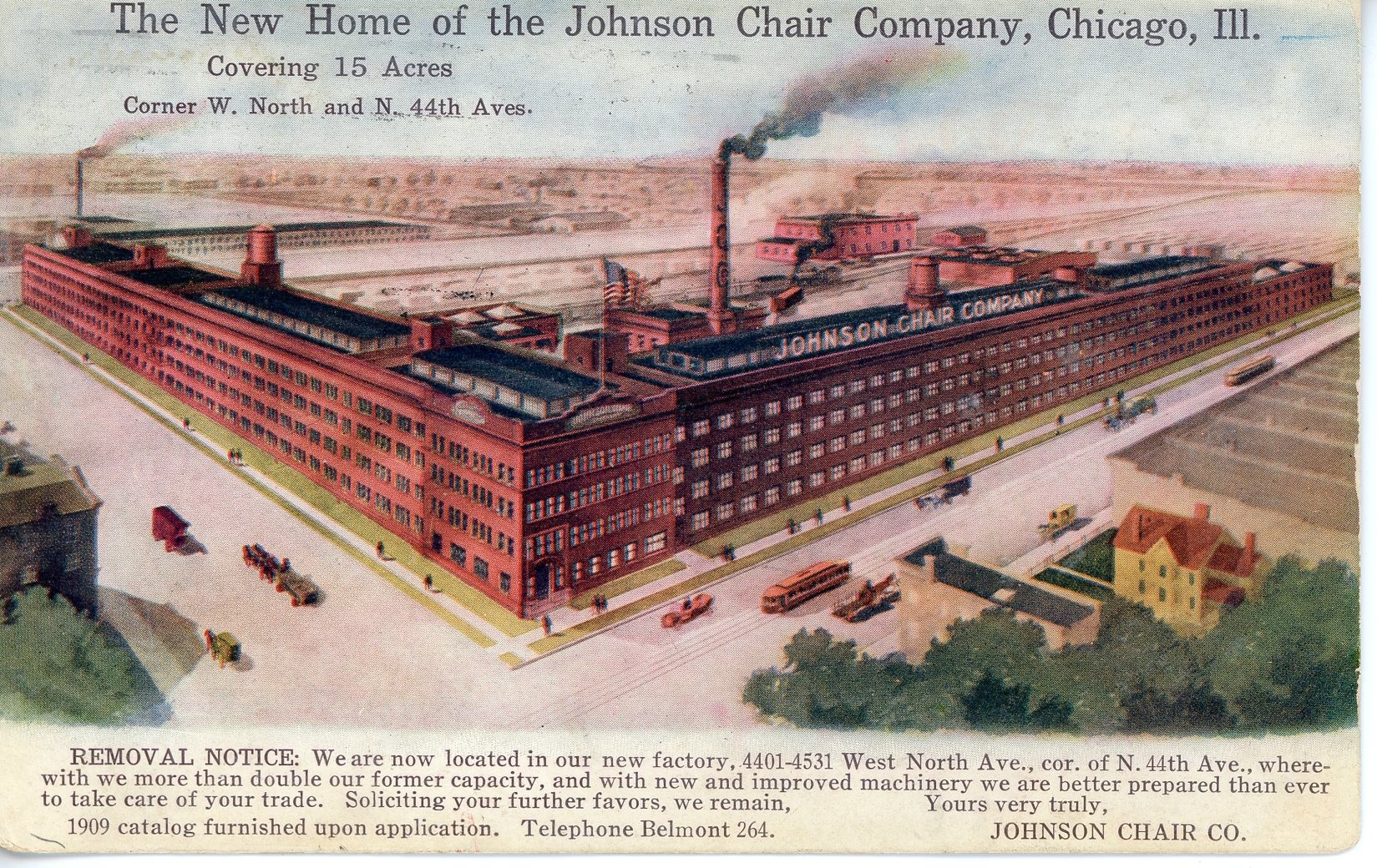
- The new Johnson Chair Company factory, circa 1909
  1909: The company began operations in the new location.
- 1948: The contents of the plant were auctioned off in mid-November. Information stated that the company would be consolidating their manufacturing facilities in another plant, and that business would continue without interruption.

=== 1949-1979 ===
- 1949: Manufacturing operations transferred to the W.H.Gunlocke Factory in Wayland, NY.
- 1979: The Gunlocke Company ceased producing chairs under the Johnson brand name.
