= Jules Montenier =

American inventor and cosmetic chemist (1895–1962)

- Montenier, as seen on his Stopette commercial
- Born: 1895; Neuchâtel
- Died: August 20, 1962 (aged 66–67); Barrington
- Education: University of Geneva
- Occupations: Inventor, chemist, assistant professor

Jules Bernard Montenier (March 23, 1895 – August 20, 1962), of Chicago, Illinois, was an American inventor and a cosmetic chemist. He founded Jules Montenier, Inc., a cosmetics company, and invented Stopette, an antiperspirant that was a longtime sponsor of the CBS game show What's My Line?. Stopette's slogan, repeated at the beginning of the episodes Montenier's company sponsored, was "Poof! There goes perspiration." Montenier was described in the introduction segment of What's My Line? as "the famous cosmetic chemist."

== Early life ==
Montenier was born in Neuchâtel, Switzerland. He obtained a degree in chemistry from the University of Geneva and worked as an assistant professor at a school in Châtelaine, now part of Geneva. In 1923, Montenier immigrated into the United states. Instead of seeking a teaching position due to his initial lack of English fluency, Montenier started working in cosmetics.

== Patents and innovations ==
Montenier held a number of patents. Arguably, his most notable patent is US patent no. 2,230,084, a January 28, 1941, patent for "Astringent preparation". This patent dealt with solving the problem of the excessive acidity of aluminum chloride (then, as now, the best-working antiperspirant known to chemistry), by adding a soluble nitrile or a similar compound. This innovation found its way into Stopette antiperspirant/deodorant spray, which Time called "the best-selling deodorant of the early 1950s"; a virtually identical patent was granted in the United Kingdom as GB0527439.

Montenier also holds a patent for the ornamental design of his Stopette bottle (US Design Patent D168,109), the shape of which was on the scorecards of What's My Line? when Stopette sponsored the show.

Montenier also holds a patent for the "Unitary container and atomizer for liquids" (US patent no. 2,642,313); This was developed in 1947 when Montenier, working with engineers from the Plax Corporation, invented a commercial use for the plastic bottle. His innovation was for Stopette, an underarm deodorant dispensed by squeezing the bottle. This invention created a huge demand in the industry for the plastic bottle; for the first time, plastic was competing with glass for this type of packaging.

Montenier also holds a patent for a fanciful design for a shaving bowl (US design patent D143,437).

== What's My Line? ==
In the opening segment that featured Stopette, Jules Montenier, Inc. also advertised "Poof! Deodorant Body Powder" and "Finesse, the Flowing Cream Shampoo" in the same segment. In mid-1953, Montenier himself was pictured in the opening segment after the products were mentioned.

=== Sponsorship of the show ===
During the first two episodes of What's My Line? in 1950, the production value was very poor. While everything that could have gone wrong did go wrong on the first show, the second show was arguably as bad. If anything, the camera work was worse. CBS liked many elements of the show, but the production value had to be improved. CBS knew that a potential sponsor could be watching the third show, so it issued an ultimatum: Either a sponsor would pick up the show, or the show would be history.

Franklin M. Heller, one of television's pioneering directors, essentially saved the show. He felt that the biggest problems with the show were too much camera movement and lens changing. Heller said, "I figured once I could get those cameramen and their flowered shirts controlled and fairly immobile, we might be able to let this show emerge."

To fix the problem, Heller changed the format of the set so that the cameras would remain stationary. He also placed moderator John Daly and the panel in different places so that the entrances and exits would not look as awkward. In addition, before the third show, Heller requested an hour rehearsal for the camera crew with mock panelists and contestants. That rehearsal gave the camera operators a better "feel" for how the show should go.

At the end of the third show, Dr. Montenier called CBS and, according to Heller, said, "I don't know what you did to it, but I'll buy it." For the next eight years, either as the sole or alternating sponsor, Stopette was the advertising face of What's My Line?

Bennett Cerf later said of Montenier that What's My Line? "ruined the poor man." Cerf said that when What's My Line? first started, none of the big companies wanted to sponsor the program. He said that everyone thought the program would last for a few months and die out, but the program "caught fire" in the ratings. Cerf noted that as the program spread from city to city, its advertising costs continued to rise accordingly. Montenier was very proud of the program, but he refused to have a co-sponsor. According to Cerf, Montenier stuck with What's My Line? until the program ruined him. At its peak, What's My Line? was running in nearly every city across the country. Cerf said that the advertising costs became so enormous that Montenier was unable to sell enough Stopette to make up for it. Eventually, Montenier was forced to sell, and this, according to Cerf, broke his heart. When he died, according to Cerf, cartoons appeared with the caption, "Poof! There goes Dr. Montenier!"

=== Mystery Guest appearance ===
Montenier himself appeared on the February 12, 1956 episode of What's My Line? as a Mystery Guest. As he signed in, he was identified on-screen as "Dr. Jules Montenier, Creator & Manufacturer of Stopette"; his "line" was "Our Sponsor (For Past Six Years)." Prior to their guesses, the panel was given the hint that Montenier was self-employed. The panel failed to guess Montenier's line correctly; he "stumped the panel and won the game," as Daly's successor as moderator, Wally Bruner, preferred to phrase it. It turned out that the purpose of Montenier's visit was to give his belated congratulations to the show for its six years on television. Daly said that Montenier was a good sponsor because he refused to interfere with the production of the show. Montenier, in return, said that he loved the show and watched it each Sunday.

Montenier remained seated during his entire appearance, after which the program went directly to a commercial; guests on the program customarily walked in and sat next to the host and walked to greet the panelists after their appearance. The audience was not given any explanation for this change, but some viewers would have read in the newspapers that Montenier had had his left leg amputated as the result of a car crash at the end of May 1954. His wife Helen had been killed in the same accident.

=== Impact on the time slot and broadcast markets ===
What's My Line? did not begin its life on Sunday nights. After Montenier's Stopette deodorant became the show's primary sponsor in March 1950, CBS moved the show from Thursdays at 8:00 to an alternating-week basis on Wednesdays at 9:00. Eventually, due largely to pressure to get higher caliber guests on the show, the show was moved back to 10:30 p.m. on Sunday nights. Since most Broadway plays closed at 10:00 p.m. at the time, this gave those actors plenty of time to get there. Montenier and his ad agency agreed with the move, and CBS agreed to reimburse the sponsor for viewers lost due to the move.

Jules Montenier, Inc.'s sponsorship of What's My Line? caused nearly a third of the United States not to see the show until 1956. The reason was that the company's ad agency controlled the time slot and would not buy the slot in markets where Jules Montenier's products were not sold. Notable markets that were missing the show until the late 1950s included Columbus, Georgia; Tallahassee, Florida; Savannah, Georgia; Spartanburg, South Carolina; Jackson, Mississippi; Memphis, Tennessee; Lancaster, Pennsylvania; Meridian, Mississippi; and Lexington, Kentucky. In 1956, Jules Montenier, Inc. was sold to Helene Curtis Industries, Inc., thereby giving the products a national market and thus enabling What's My Line? to be shown nationwide.

== Popular culture ==
The Harvard Lampoon, forerunner of the National Lampoon, once had a cartoon of Montenier shooting through the top of a building, with the caption “Poof! There goes Dr. Montenier.” Of this, Cerf said of Montenier, "He was a sweet man—but a bit of a fraud, you know."

== Company legacy ==
As Cerf noted, the 1956 sale of his company to Helene Curtis broke Montenier's heart. In 1996, the British-Dutch conglomerate Unilever purchased Helene Curtis, and as of August 2016, it still retains ownership of all Helene Curtis patents, trademarks, and copyrights.
