= Alum =

Family of double sulfate salts of aluminium

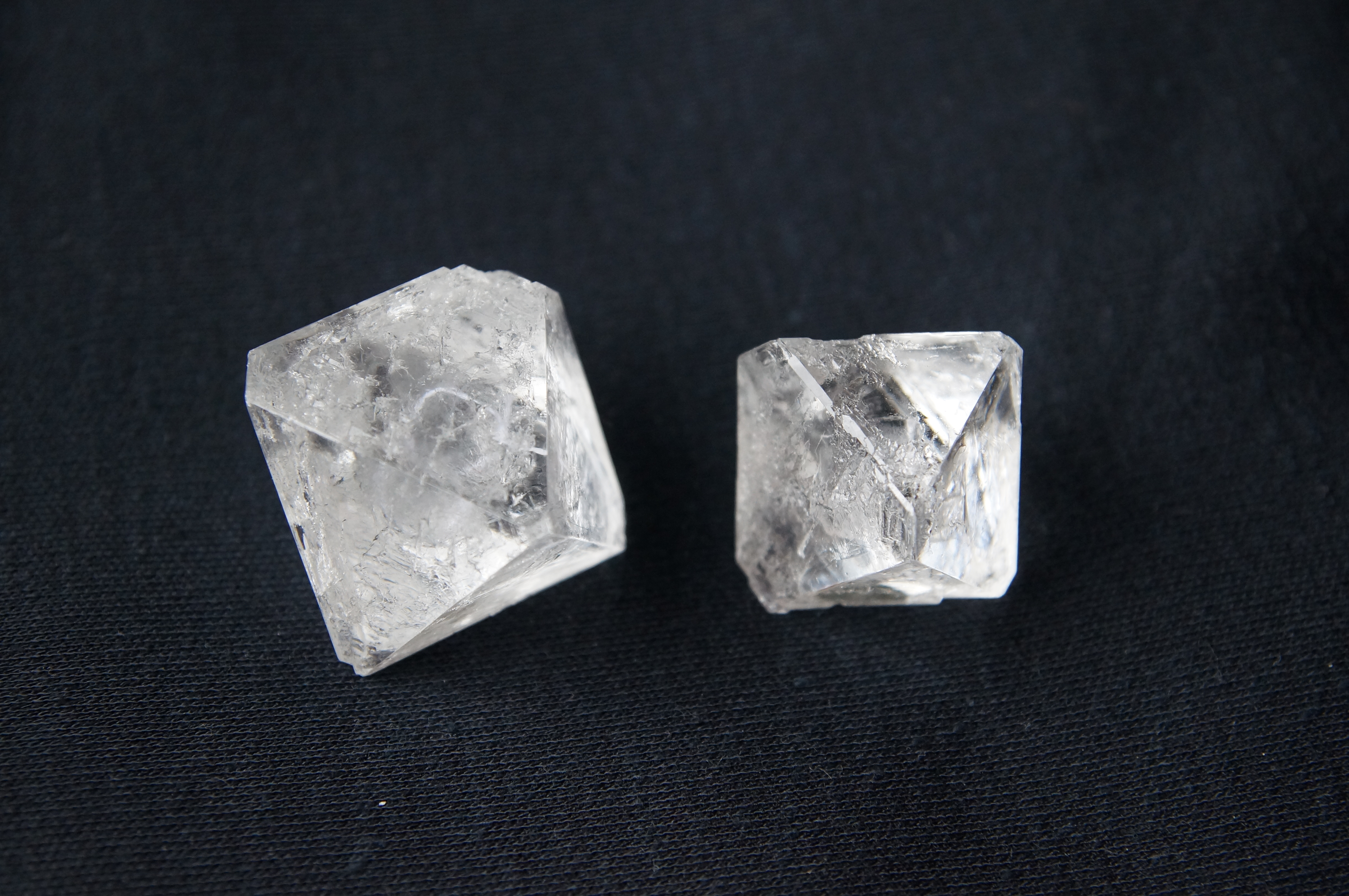
Crystal of potassium alum, KAl(SO_{4})_{2}·12H_{2}O

An alum (/ˈæləm/) is a type of chemical compound, usually a hydrated double sulfate salt of aluminium with the general formula XAl(SO_{4})_{2}·12H_{2}O, such that X is a monovalent cation such as potassium or ammonium. By itself, alum often refers to potassium alum, with the formula KAl(SO_{4})_{2}·12H_{2}O. Other alums are named after the monovalent ion, such as sodium alum and ammonium alum.

The name alum is also used, more generally, for salts with the same formula and structure, except that aluminium is replaced by another trivalent metal ion like chromium^{III}, or sulfur is replaced by another chalcogen like selenium. The most common of these analogs is chrome alum KCr(SO_{4})_{2}·12H_{2}O.

In most industries, the name alum (or papermaker's alum) is used to refer to aluminium sulfate, Al_{2}(SO_{4})_{3}·nH_{2}O, which is used for most industrial flocculation (the variable n is an integer whose size depends on the amount of water absorbed into the alum). For medicine, the word alum may also refer to aluminium hydroxide gel used as a vaccine adjuvant.

== History ==
=== Alum found at archaeological sites ===
This stone was used for many purposes in ancient Indian households. The western desert of Egypt was a major source of alum substitutes in antiquity. These evaporites were mainly FeAl_{2}(SO_{4})_{4}·22H_{2}O, MgAl_{2}(SO_{4})_{4}·22H_{2}O, NaAl(SO_{4})_{2}·6H_{2}O, MgSO_{4}·7H_{2}O, and Al_{2}(SO_{4})_{3}·17H_{2}O. The Ancient Greek Herodotus mentions Egyptian alum as a valuable commodity in his Histories.

The production of potassium alum from alunite is archaeologically attested on the island Lesbos. The site was abandoned during the 7th century CE, but dates back at least to the 2nd century CE. Native alumen from the island of Melos appears to have been a mixture mainly of alunogen (Al_{2}(SO_{4})_{3}·17H_{2}O) with potassium alum and other minor sulfates.

=== Alumen in Pliny and Dioscorides ===
A detailed description of a substance termed alumen occurs in the Roman Pliny the Elder's Natural History.

By comparing Pliny's description with the account of stypteria (στυπτηρία) given by Dioscorides, it is obvious the two are identical. Pliny informs us that a form of alumen was found naturally in the earth, and terms it salsugoterrae.

Pliny wrote that different substances were distinguished by the name of alumen, but they were all characterised by a certain degree of astringency, and were all employed for dyeing and medicine. Pliny wrote that there is another kind of alum that the ancient Greeks term schiston, and which "splits into filaments of a whitish colour". From the name schiston and the mode of formation, it seems that this kind was the salt that forms spontaneously on certain salty minerals, as alum slate and bituminous shale, and consists mainly of sulfates of iron and aluminium. One kind of alumen was a liquid, which was apt to be adulterated; but when pure it had the property of blackening when added to pomegranate juice. This property seems to characterize a solution of iron^{II} sulfate in water; a solution of ordinary (potassium) alum would possess no such property. Contamination with iron sulfate was greatly disliked as this darkened and dulled dye colours. In some places the iron sulfate may have been lacking, so the salt would be white and would be suitable, according to Pliny, for dyeing bright colors.

Pliny describes several other types of alumen but it is not clear as to what these minerals are. The alumen of the ancients, then, was not always potassium alum, not even an alkali aluminum sulfate.

=== Alum described in medieval texts ===
Alum and green vitriol (iron sulfate) both have sweetish and astringent taste, and they had overlapping uses. Therefore, through the Middle Ages, alchemists and other writers do not seem to have distinguished the two salts accurately. In the writings of the alchemists we find the words misy, sory, and chalcanthum applied to either compound; and the name atramentum sutorium, which one might expect to belong exclusively to green vitriol, applied indiscriminately to both.

Alum was the most common mordant (substance used to set dyes on fabrics) used by the dye industry, especially in Islamic countries, during the middle ages. It was the main export of the Chad region, from where it was transported to the markets of Egypt and Morocco, and then to Europe. Less significant sources were found in Egypt and Yemen.

=== Modern understanding of the alums ===
During the early 1700s, G. E. Stahl claimed that reacting sulfuric acid with limestone produced a sort of alum. (Note: CVII. Vitriolum, Creta præcipitari potest, ut omissa metallica sua substantia, aluminosum evadat. [107. Sulfuric acid [and] chalk can [form a] precipitate, as its liberated metallic substance, alum, escapes.] Ausführliche Betrachtung und zulänglicher Beweiss von den Saltzen, daß diesselbe aus einer zarten Erde, mit Wasser innig verbunden, bestehen [Detailed treatment and adequate proof of salts, that they consist of a subtile earth intimately bound with water] — G. E. Stahl (1703)) (Note: Wäysenhaus, Halle ... wie aus Kreide und Vitriole-Spiritu, ein rechter Alaun erwächset: ... [... as from chalk and sulfuric acid, a real alum arises ...] — G. E. Stahl (1723)) The error was soon corrected by Johann Heinrich Pott and Andreas Sigismund Marggraf, who showed that the precipitate obtained when an alkali is poured into a solution of alum, namely alumina, is quite different from lime and chalk, and is one of the ingredients in common clay. (Note: Concentrirt man hingegen diese solution gelinde, und läßt sie crystallisiren, so schiessen harte und mercklich adstringente und hinter her etwas süßliche crystallen an, die allen Umständen nach in der Haupt-Sach nichts anders sind als ein formaler Alaun. Diese Entdeckung ist in der physicalischen Chymie von Wichtigkeit. Man hat bishero geglaubt, die Grund-Erde des Alauns sey eine in acido Vitrioli solvirte kalckige ... Erde, ... [On the other hand, if one gently concentrates this solution, and lets it crystallize, then there precipitate hard, noticeably astringent crystals with a somewhat sweet aftertaste, which in all circumstances are mainly nothing other than a form of alum. This discovery is of importance to chemistry. One had hitherto believed [that] the fundamental earth of alum is a calcareous ... earth dissolved in sulfuric acid, ...] — J. H. Pott (1746))

Marggraf also showed that perfect crystals with properties of alum can be obtained by dissolving alumina in sulfuric acid and adding potash or ammonia to the concentrated solution. In 1767, Torbern Bergman observed the need for potassium or ammonium sulfates to convert aluminium sulfate into alum, while sodium or calcium would not work. (Note: After acknowledging that Marggraf had noticed that potash caused alum to crystallize from a solution of alumina and sulfuric acid, Bergman adds "Notatu quoque dignum est, quod hoc cristallisationis obstaculum alcali volatili aeque tollatur, non vero alkali minerali et calce." [It is significant as well that by [use of] the volatile alkali (i.e., ammonia) this obstacle to crystallization is similarly removed, but not [in the cases of] mineral alkali] (i.e., sodium carbonate and lime). — Bergman (1767))

The composition of common alum was determined finally by Louis Vauquelin in 1797. As soon as Martin Klaproth discovered the presence of potassium in leucite and lepidolite, (Note: "On the contrary, I was surprised in an unexpected manner, by discovering in it another constituent part, consisting of a substance, the existence of which, certainly, no one person would have conjectured within the limits of the mineral kingdom ... This constituent part of leucite ... is no other than pot-ash, which, hitherto, has been thought exclusively to belong to the vegetable kingdom, and has, on this account, been called vegetable alkali. This discovery, which I think of great importance, cannot fail to occasion considerable changes in the systems of natural history, ... ." — M. H. Klaproth (1801)) Vauquelin demonstrated that common alum is a double salt, composed of sulfuric acid, alumina, and potash. In the same journal volume, Chaptal published the analysis of four different kinds of alum, namely, Roman alum, Levant alum, British alum, and an alum manufactured by himself, confirming Vauquelin's result.

== Production ==
Some alums occur as minerals, the most important being alunite.

The most important alums – potassium, sodium, and ammonium – are produced industrially. Typical recipes involve combining aluminium sulfate and the sulfate monovalent cation. The aluminium sulfate is usually obtained by treating minerals like alum schist, bauxite and cryolite with sulfuric acid.

== Types ==
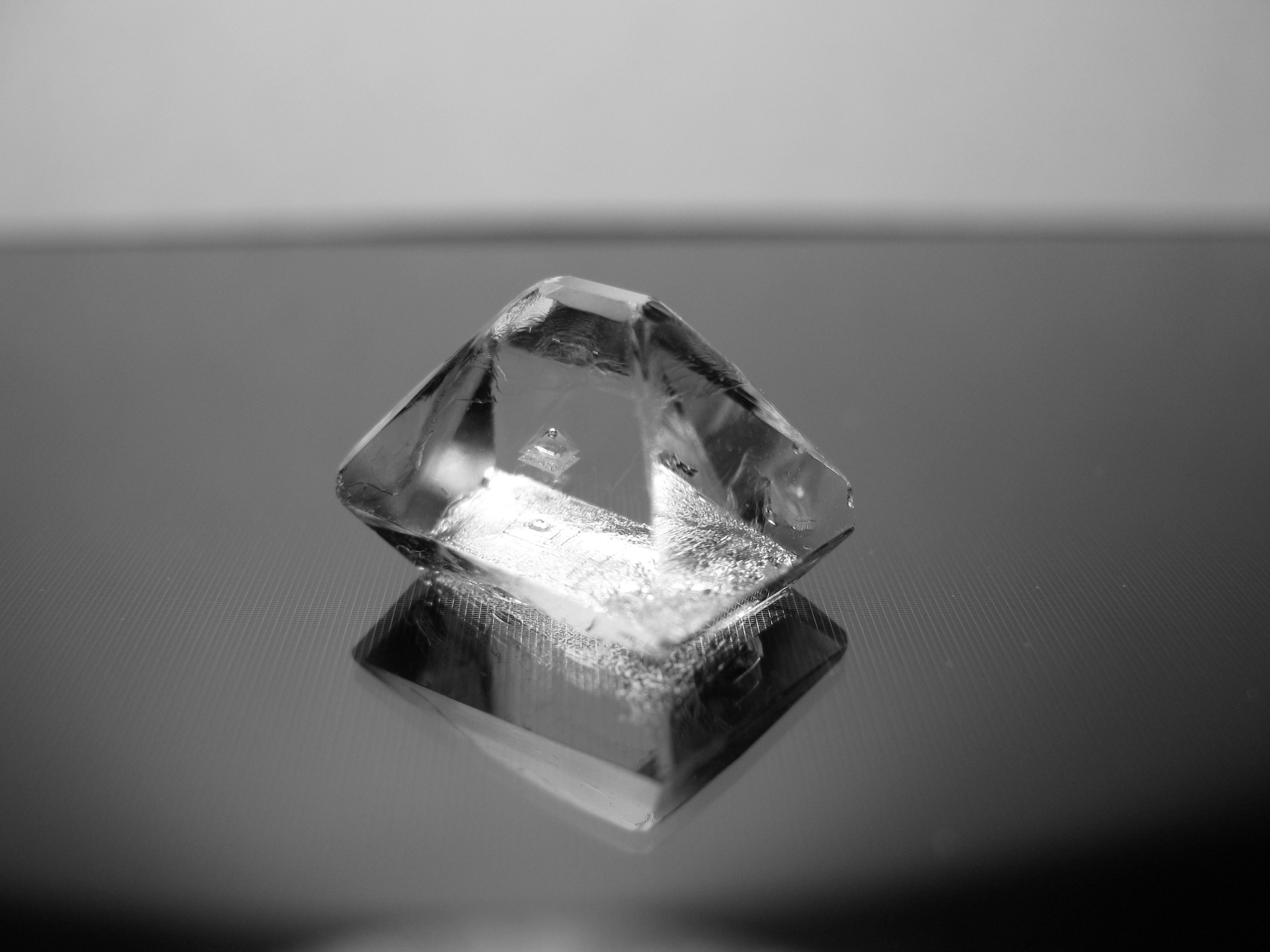
Crystal of potassium alum

Aluminium-based alums are named by the monovalent cation. Unlike the other alkali metals, lithium does not form alums, a fact attributed to the small size of its ion.

The most important alums are

- Potassium alum, KAl(SO_{4})_{2}·12H_{2}O, also called "potash alum" or simply "alum"
- Sodium alum, NaAl(SO_{4})_{2}·12H_{2}O, also called "soda alum" or "SAS"
- Ammonium alum, NH_{4}Al(SO_{4})_{2}·12H_{2}O

== Chemical properties ==
Aluminium-based alums have a number of common chemical properties. They are soluble in water, have a sweetish taste, react as acid by turning blue litmus to red, and crystallize in regular octahedra. In alums each metal ion is surrounded by six water molecules. When heated, they liquefy, and if the heating is continued, the water of crystallization is driven off, the salt froths and swells, and at last an amorphous powder remains. They are astringent and acidic.

=== Crystal structure ===
Alums crystallize in one of three different crystal structures. These classes are called α-, β- and γ-alums. The first X-ray crystal structures of alums were reported in 1927 by James M. Cork and Lawrence Bragg, and were used to develop the phase retrieval technique isomorphous replacement.

=== Solubility ===
The solubility of the various alums in water varies greatly, sodium alum being soluble readily in water, while caesium and rubidium alums are only slightly soluble. The various solubilities are shown in the following table.

At temperature T, 100 parts water dissolve:

T	Ammonium alum	Potassium alum	Rubidium alum	Caesium alum
0 °C	2.62	3.90	0.71	0.19
10 °C	4.50	9.52	1.09	0.29
50 °C	15.9	44.11	4.98	1.235
80 °C	35.20	134.47	21.60	5.29
100 °C	70.83	357.48	-	-

== Uses ==
=== Industrial processes ===
Aluminium-based alums have been used since antiquity, and are still important for many industrial processes. The most widely used alum is potassium alum. It has been used since antiquity as a flocculant to clarify cloudy liquids, as a mordant (or binder) in dyeing, and in tanning. It is still widely used in water treatment, for medicine, for cosmetics (in deodorant), for food preparation (in baking powder and pickling), and to fire-proof paper and cloth.

=== Topical antihemorrhagic ===
Alum is used as a styptic (to stop bleeding) in styptic pencils available from pharmacists. Alum blocks, available from barber shops and gentlemen's outfitters, are used to stem bleeding from shaving nicks; and as an astringent.

Powdered alum are also used in Southeast Asian traditional medicine for open wounds and sores.

=== Deodorant ===
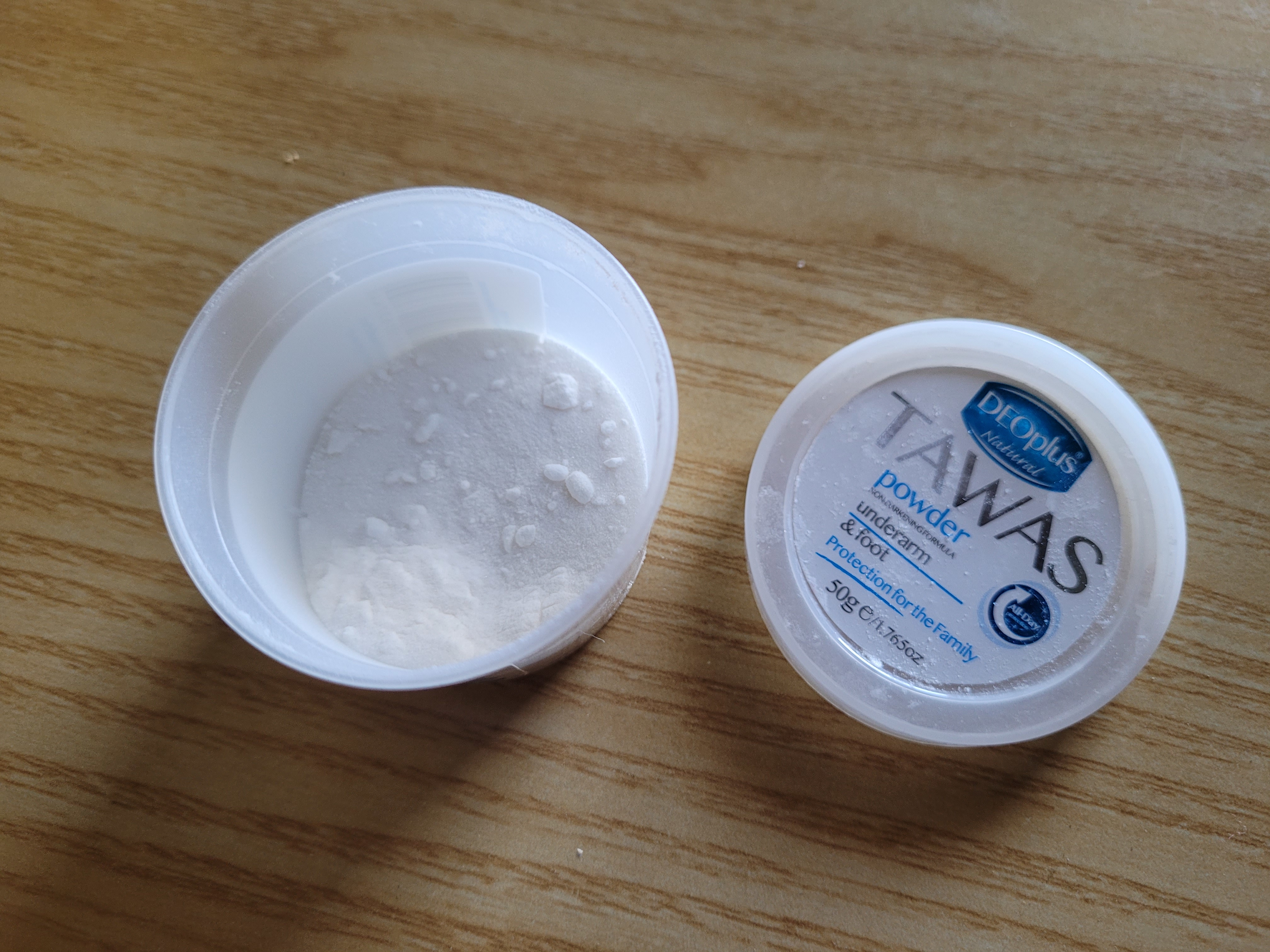
Tawas (powdered alum crystals), a traditional scent-less deodorant for underarm and feet odor in the Philippines and most of Island Southeast Asia

An alum block can be used directly as a perfume-free deodorant, and unprocessed mineral alum is sold in Indian bazaars for that purpose. Throughout Island Southeast Asia, potassium alum is most widely known as tawas and has numerous uses. It is used as a traditional antiperspirant and deodorant. The crystals are usually ground into a fine powder before use.

=== Bread ===
In Britain, alum has been used as a way of preserving flour and bleaching it. Bakers used small amounts to make the fine white manchet bread produced for the rich. In times of poor harvest, more alum was added. In 1758 the British government banned the use of alum in bread, although some bakers continued to use it and many people continued to demand white bread adulterated with alum.

During the 19th century, alum was used along with other substances like plaster of Paris to adulterate certain food products, particularly bread. It was used to make lower-grade flour appear whiter, allowing the producers to spend less on whiter flour. Because it retains water, it would make the bread heavier, meaning that merchants could charge more for it in their shops. The amount of alum present in each loaf of bread could reach concentrations that would be toxic to humans and cause chronic diarrhoea, which could result in the death of young children.

=== Textiles and paper ===
Alum is used as a mordant in traditional textiles; For traditional Japanese art, alum and animal glue were dissolved in water, forming a liquid known as dousa (Japanese: 礬水), and used as an undercoat for paper sizing.

=== Jewelry ===
In Indonesia and the Philippines, solutions of tawas, salt, borax, and organic pigments were used to change the color of gold ornaments.

Alum in the form of potassium aluminium sulphate or ammonium aluminium sulfate in a concentrated bath of hot water is regularly used by jewelers and machinists to dissolve hardened steel drill bits that have broken off in items made of aluminum, copper, brass, gold (any karat), silver (both sterling and fine), and stainless steel. This is because alum does not react chemically to any significant degree with any of these metals, but will corrode carbon steel. When heat is applied to an alum mixture holding a piece of work that has a drill bit stuck in it, if the lost bit is small enough, it can sometimes be dissolved or removed within hours.

=== Other ===
In the Philippines, alum crystals were also burned and allowed to drip into a basin of water by babaylan for divination. It is also used in other rituals in the animistic anito religions of the islands.

== Related compounds ==
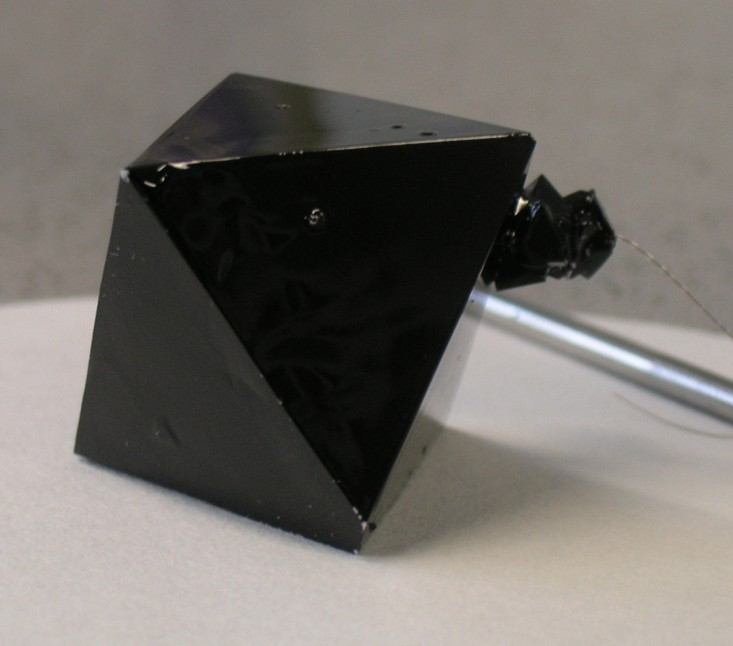
Chrome alum crystal

Many trivalent metals are capable of forming alums. The general form of an alum is XY(SO_{4})_{2}·nH_{2}O, where X is an alkali metal or ammonium, Y is a trivalent metal, and n often is 12. The most important example is chrome alum, KCr(SO_{4})_{2}·12H_{2}O, a dark violet crystalline double sulfate of chromium and potassium, was used in tanning.

In general, alums are formed more easily when the alkali metal atom is larger. This rule was first stated by Locke in 1902, who found that if a trivalent metal does not form a caesium alum, it neither will form an alum with any other alkali metal or with ammonium.

=== Selenate-containing alums ===
Selenium or selenate alums are also known that contain selenium in place of sulfur in the sulfate anion, making selenate (SeO^{2−}_{4}) instead. They are strong oxidizing agents.

=== Mixed alums ===
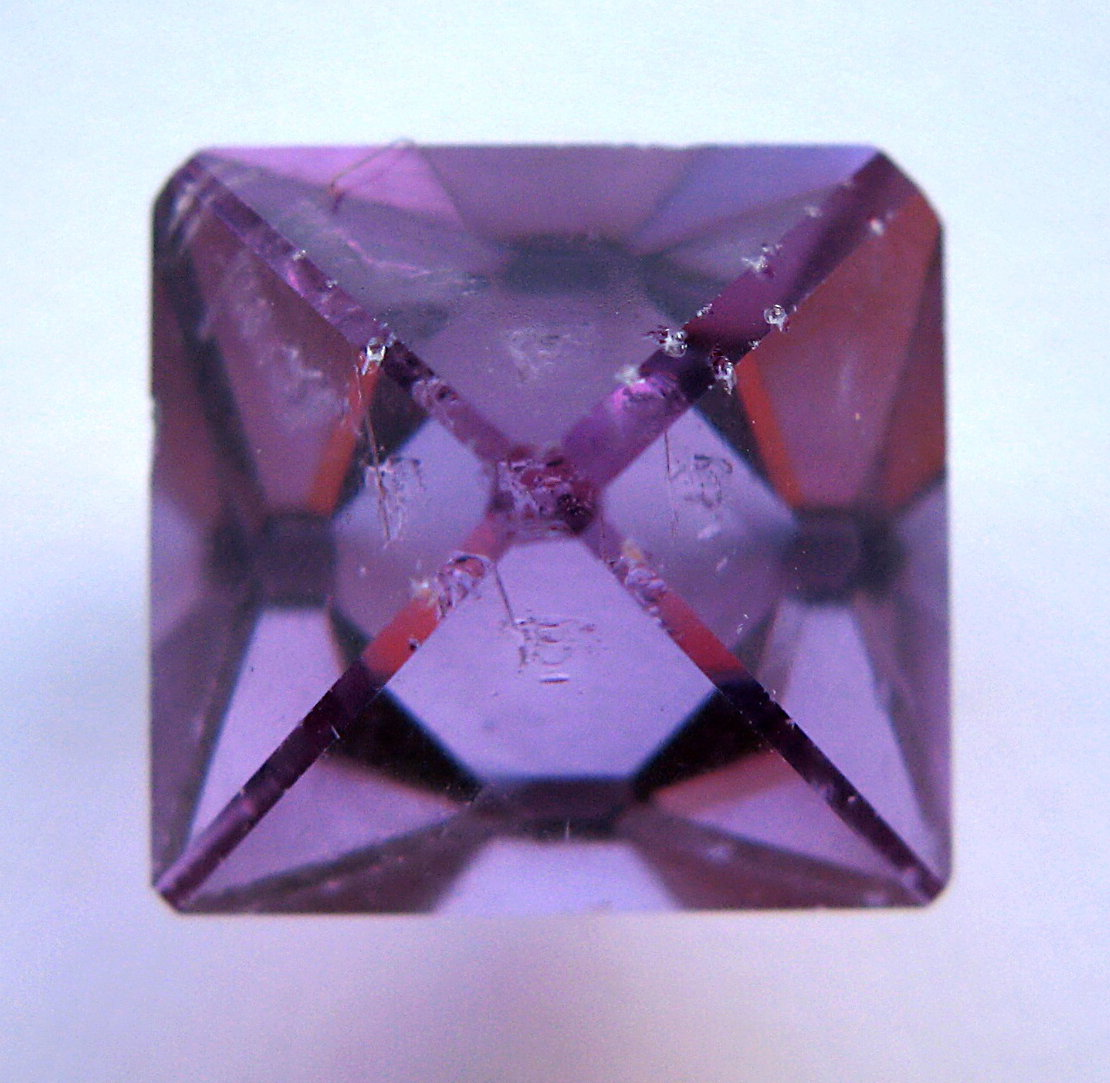
Alum crystal with small amount of chrome alum to give a slight violet color

In some cases, solid solutions of alums with different monovalent and trivalent cations may occur.

=== Other hydrates ===
In addition to the alums, which are dodecahydrates, double sulfates and selenates of univalent and trivalent cations occur with other degrees of hydration. These materials may also be referred to as alums, including the undecahydrates such as mendozite and kalinite, hexahydrates such as guanidinium (CH_{6}N^{+}_{3}) and dimethylammonium ((CH_{3}) 2NH^{+}_{2}) "alums", tetrahydrates such as goldichite, monohydrates such as thallium plutonium sulfate and anhydrous alums (yavapaiites). These classes include differing, but overlapping, combinations of ions.

=== Other double sulfates ===
A pseudo alum is a double sulfate of the typical formula XSO_{4}·Y_{2}(SO_{4})_{3}·22H_{2}O, such that X is a divalent metal ion, such as cobalt (wupatkiite), manganese (apjohnite), magnesium (pickeringite) or iron (halotrichite or feather alum), and Y is a trivalent metal ion.

Double sulfates with the general formula X_{2}SO_{4}·Y_{2}(SO_{4})_{3}·24H_{2}O are also known, where X is a monovalent cation such as sodium, potassium, rubidium, caesium, thallium^{I}, ammonium (NH^{+}_{4}), methylammonium (CH_{3}NH^{+}_{3}), hydroxylammonium (HONH^{+}_{3}), or hydrazinium (N_{2}H^{+}_{5}), and Y is a trivalent metal ion, such as aluminium, chromium, titanium, manganese, vanadium, iron^{III}, cobalt, gallium, molybdenum, indium, ruthenium, rhodium, or iridium. Analogous selenates also occur. The possible combinations of univalent cation, trivalent cation, and anion depends on the sizes of the ions.

A Tutton salt is a double sulfate of the typical formula X_{2}SO_{4}·YSO_{4}·6H_{2}O, where X is a monovalent cation, and Y a divalent metal ion.

Double sulfates of the composition X_{2}SO_{4}·2YSO_{4}, such that X is a monovalent cation and Y is a divalent metal ion are referred to as langbeinites, after the prototypical potassium magnesium sulfate.

== See also ==
- Alunite
- Gum bichromate – photo prints and other similar processes use alums, sometimes as colloid (gelatin, albumen) hardeners
- List of minerals
