= Tschermigite =

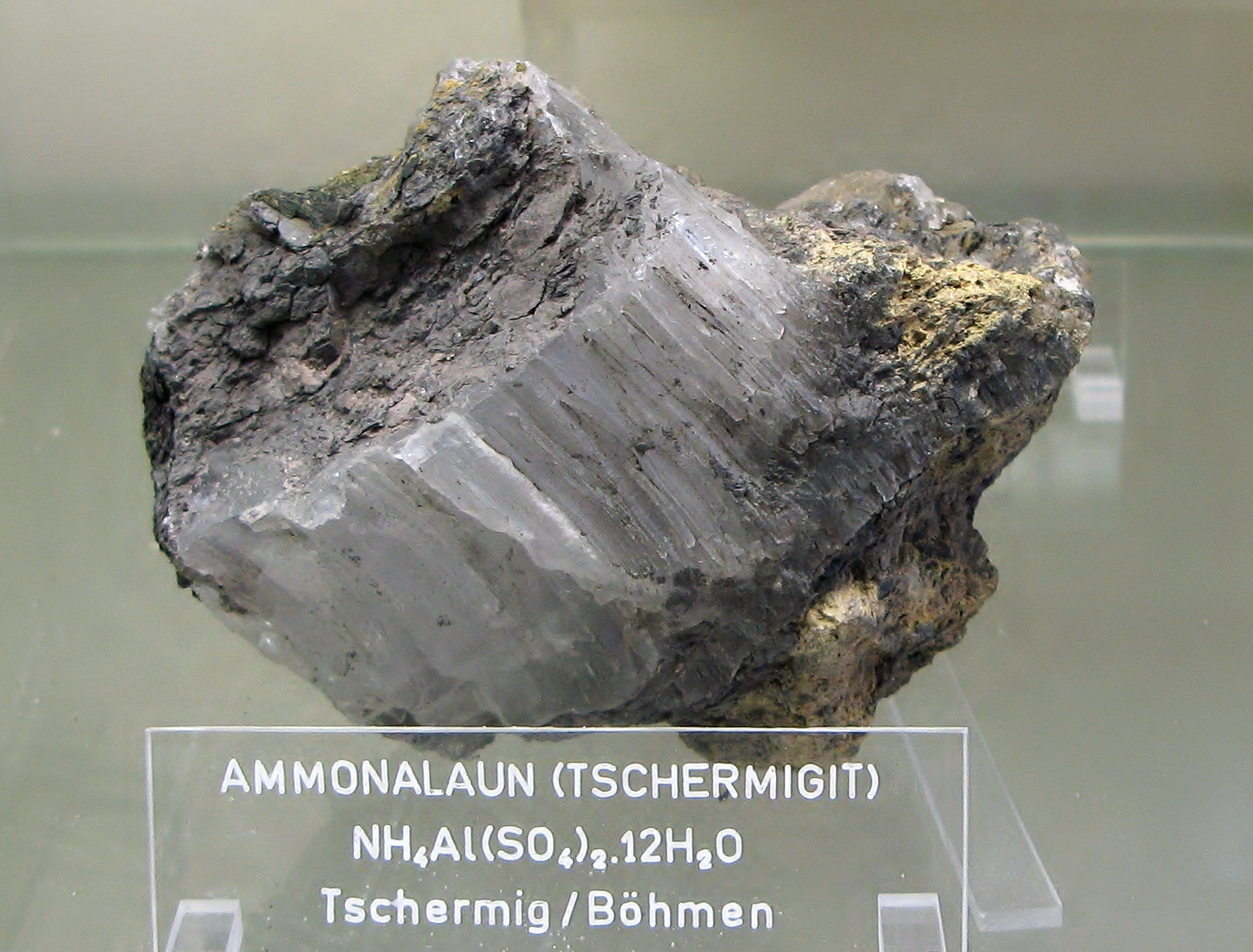
- Tschermigite from Tschermig, Bohemia.

General
- Category: Sulfate mineral
- Formula: NH_{4}Al(SO_{4})_{2}·12(H_{2}O
- IMA symbol: Tmi)
- Strunz classification: 7.CC.20
- Crystal system: Isometric
- Crystal class: Diploidal (m3̅); H-M symbol: (2/m 3̅)
- Space group: Pa3 (no. 205)
- Unit cell: a = 12.215 Å; Z = 4

Identification
- Color: Colorless, white; colorless in transmitted light
- Crystal habit: Octahedral crystals; fibrous columnar; powdery
- Cleavage: Perfect on {100}
- Fracture: Conchoidal
- Mohs scale hardness: 1 1/2 - 2
- Luster: Vitreous, silky
- Streak: White
- Diaphaneity: Transparent to translucent
- Specific gravity: 1.645
- Optical properties: Isotropic
- Refractive index: 1.458
- Birefringence: Anomalously birefringent
- Solubility: Deliquescent

Tschermigite is a mineral form of ammonium alum, formula NH_{4}Al(SO_{4})_{2}·12(H_{2}O). It is found in burning coal seams, bituminous shale and fumaroles. Because of its extreme water solubility it is unlikely to persist except in the dryest of conditions. Discovered in 1852 at Cermiky, also known as Tschermig in Bohemia. It is colorless and named for where it was discovered.
