= Superior knowledge doctrine =

Doctrine in US contract law

The superior knowledge doctrine is a principle in United States contract law that states that the government must disclose to a contractor any otherwise unavailable information that is vital to contract performance. It is also referred to as "the Helene Curtis doctrine of superior knowledge.

In order to recover under the superior knowledge doctrine, a contractor must prove each of the following elements:

1. The contractor undertook to perform the contract without vital knowledge of a fact directly affecting performance, cost, or duration of the contract.
2. The government was aware that the contractor had no knowledge of the information, and that the contractor had no reason to attempt to obtain this information.
3. A contract specification that the government supplied to the contractor misled the contractor, or failed to put the contractor on notice to inquire more.
4. The government failed to provide the relevant information.

== History ==
The case most often cited as initiating the superior knowledge doctrine is Helene Curtis Industries, Inc. v. United States. Helene Curtis Industries received an army contract for large quantities of a disinfectant chlorine powder that had never been mass-produced. The powder was to be used by U.S. troops in Korea to disinfect mess gear and fresh fruits and vegetables. The Army prepared directions for production of the new disinfectant powder. Based on the specifications, the contractor concluded that only a simple mixing technique was needed and submitted its bid.

The Army already knew that a costly grinding operation would be required to produce the disinfectant powder. The Army also knew the contractor planned to simply mix the ingredients together, without performing any grinding. After the contract was awarded, the disinfectant failed to meet the specified solubility test. The company then investigated and discovered that the powder needed to be ground. The contractor sued for the costs of finding that it needed to grind the powder, because the Army should have shared this superior knowledge.

== Later cases ==
Later cases have established that:

1. The government may have a greater obligation to provide information where the contractor is a small business enterprise since it is presumed that such contractors will have less knowledge.
2. The Government has a duty to disclose its superior knowledge about the procurement history of the item and the fact that it had never been mass-produced without a waiver of certain specifications. The government's duty to disclose is heightened if the contractor is a small business.
3. The superior knowledge doctrine was potentially applicable to even classified information regarding prior secret technology. Although disclosure of the details of the classified information may not be necessary or possible, the Government may have a duty to give a warning or make some other more general disclosure.
