= Ammonium alum =

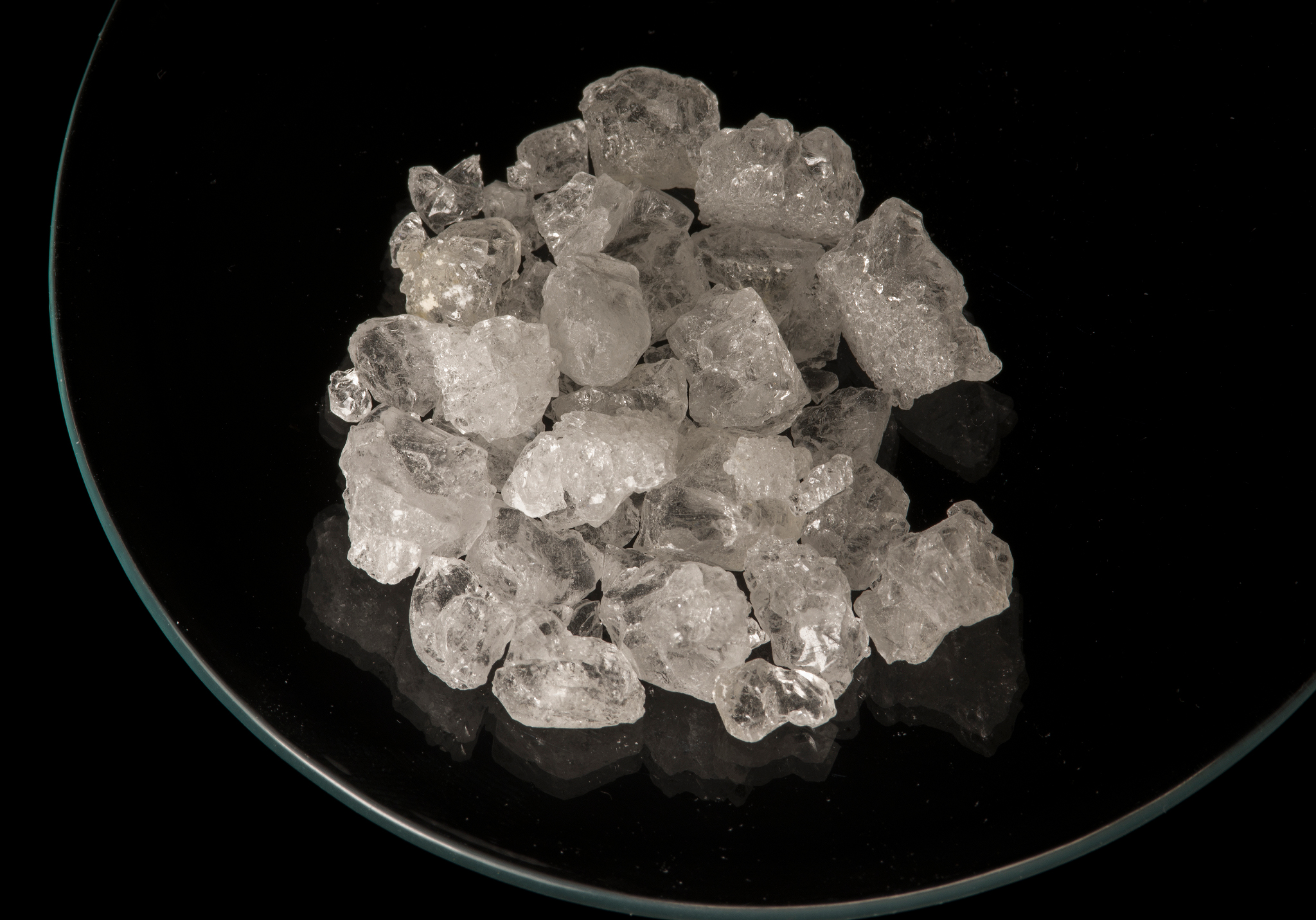

Names
- Other names: Ammonium alum sulfate; Tschermigite

Identifiers
| CAS Number | 7784-25-0; 7784-26-1 (dodecahydrate) |
| 3D model (JSmol) | Interactive image |
| ChemSpider | 2297489; 56419 (dodecahydrate) |
| ECHA InfoCard | 100.029.141 |
| EC Number | 232-055-3 616-522-2 (dodecahydrate) |
| E number | E523 (acidity regulators, ...) |
| KEGG | D02842 (dodecahydrate) |
| PubChem CID | 3032540; 62668 (dodecahydrate) |
| RTECS number | WS5640010 |
| UNII | DPU64XYB1D; 5C36DRL9ZN (dodecahydrate) |
| CompTox Dashboard (EPA) | DTXSID7051428 |
- InChI: InChI=1S/Al.H3N.2H2O4S/c;;2*1-5(2,3)4/h;1H3;2*(H2,1,2,3,4)/q+3;;;/p-3 Key: LCQXXBOSCBRNNT-UHFFFAOYSA-K; InChI=1/Al.H3N.2H2O4S/c;;2*1-5(2,3)4/h;1H3;2*(H2,1,2,3,4)/q+3;;;/p-3 Key: LCQXXBOSCBRNNT-DFZHHIFOAY
- SMILES: [Al+3].[O-]S(=O)(=O)[O-].[O-]S([O-])(=O)=O.[NH4+]

Properties
| Chemical formula | (NH_{4})Al(SO_{4})_{2} |
| Molar mass | 237.15 g/mol (anhydrous); 453.33 g/mol (dodecahydrate) |
| Appearance | white crystals |
| Density | 2.45 g/cm^{3} (anhydrous); 1.64 g/cm^{3} (dodecahydrate) |
| Melting point | 93.5 °C (200.3 °F; 366.6 K) (dodecahydrate) |
| Boiling point | 120 °C (248 °F; 393 K) dehydr. (dodecahydrate) |
| Solubility in water | 15 g/100 ml (20 °C, dodecahydrate) |

Structure
| Crystal structure | Hexagonal (anhydrous); Cubic (dodecahydrate) |
| Coordination geometry | Octahedral (Al^{3+}) |

Hazards
- GHS labelling
| Pictograms | |
| Signal word | Warning |
| Hazard statements | H315, H319 |
| Precautionary statements | P264, P280, P302+P352, P305+P351+P338, P321, P332+P313, P337+P313, P362 |
| Flash point | Non-flammable |
| Safety data sheet (SDS) | [External MSDS] |
- Except where otherwise noted, data are given for materials in their standard state (at 25 °C [77 °F], 100 kPa). verify (what is ?) Infobox references

Ammonium aluminium sulfate, also known as ammonium alum or just alum (though there are many different substances also called "alum"), is a white crystalline double sulfate usually encountered as the dodecahydrate, formula (NH_{4})Al(SO_{4})_{2}·12H_{2}O. It is used in small amounts in a variety of niche applications. The dodecahydrate occurs naturally as the rare mineral tschermigite.

== Production and basic properties ==
Ammonium alum is made from aluminium hydroxide, sulfuric acid and ammonium sulfate. It forms a solid solution with potassium alum. Pyrolysis leaves alumina. Such alumina is used in the production of grinding powders and as precursors to synthetic gems.

== Uses ==
Ammonium alum is not a major industrial chemical or a particularly useful laboratory reagent, but it is cheap and effective, which invites many niche applications. It is used in water purification, in vegetable glues, in porcelain cements, in deodorants and in tanning, dyeing and in fireproofing textiles. The pH of the solution resulting from the topical application of ammonium alum with perspiration is typically in the slightly acid range, from 3 to 5.

Ammonium alum is a common ingredient in animal repellent sprays.
