= Kalinite =

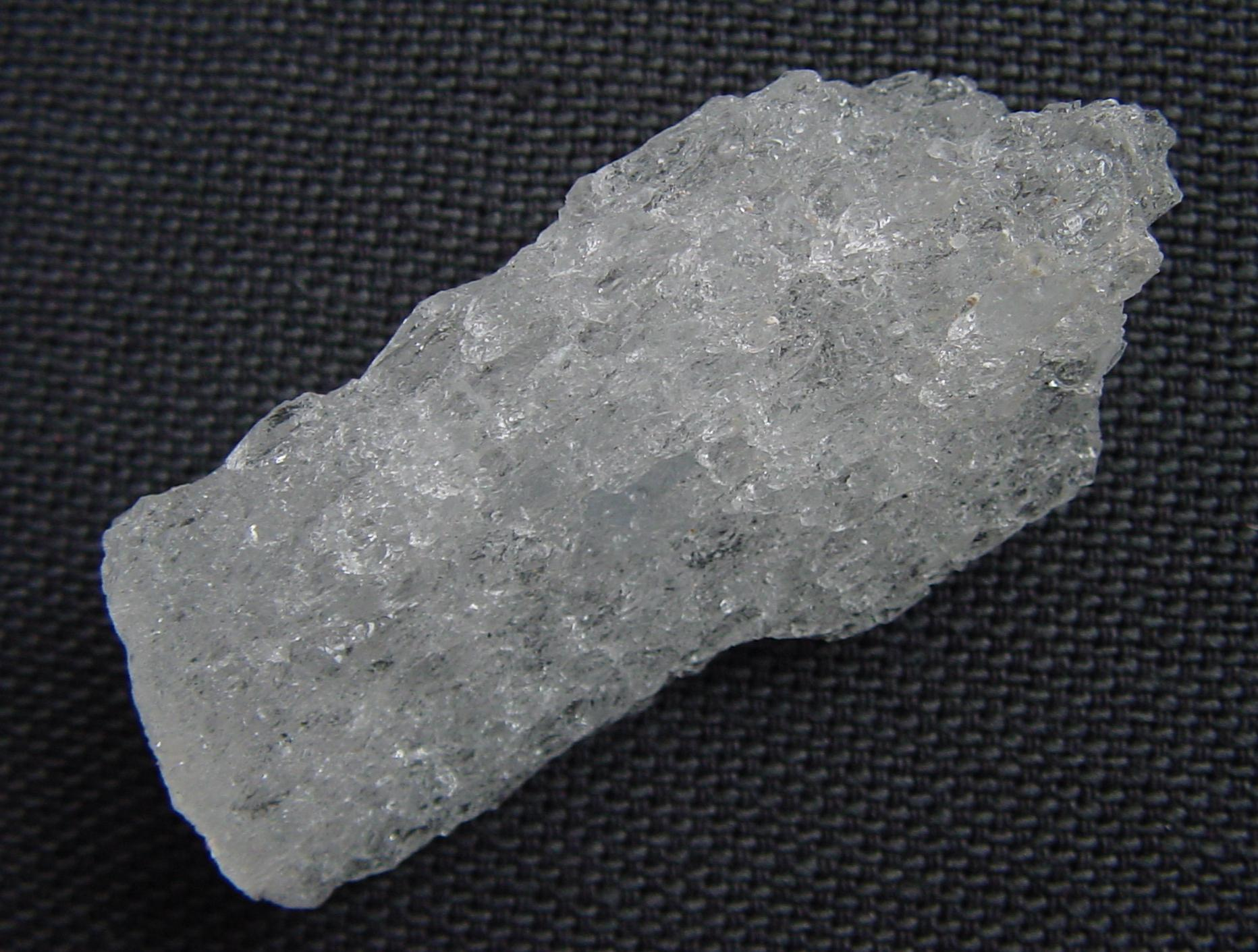
- Kalinite from the Virgin Valley District, Nevada, USA. Specimen size 5.4 cm

General
- Category: Sulfate minerals
- Formula: KAl(SO_{4})_{2}·11H_{2}O
- IMA symbol: Kli
- Strunz classification: 7.CC.15
- Dana classification: 29.5.4.2
- Crystal system: Monoclinic
- Crystal class: Prismatic (2/m) (same H-M symbol)
- Space group: C2/c
- Unit cell: a = 19.92(16), b = 9.27(3) c = 8.304(13) Å β = 98.79(19)°; Z = 4

Identification
- Formula mass: 456.37 g/mol
- Color: White to pale blue
- Crystal habit: Fibrous
- Fracture: Conchoidal
- Mohs scale hardness: 2 to 2.5
- Luster: Vitreous
- Streak: White
- Diaphaneity: Transparent
- Specific gravity: 1.75 (observed) 2.0 (calculated)
- Optical properties: Biaxial (−)
- Refractive index: n_{α} = 1.429 to 1.430, n_{β} = 1.452, n_{γ} = 1.456 to 1.458
- Birefringence: None
- 2V angle: 52° (measured), 82° (calculated)
- Solubility: Soluble in water
- Other characteristics: Not fluorescent, barely detectable radioactivity

Kalinite is a mineral composed of hydrated potassium aluminium sulfate (a type of alum). It is a fibrous monoclinic alum, distinct from isometric potassium alum, named in 1868. Its name comes from kalium (derived from Arabic: القَلْيَه al-qalyah "plant ashes", which is the Latin name for potassium, hence its chemical symbol, "K".

A proposal to remove recognition of kalinite as a mineral species was submitted to the International Mineralogical Association; however, kalinite is still on the list of approved minerals. Many older samples, however, have been found to be potassium alum.

== Environment ==
Kalinite is a rare secondary mineral observed in the oxidized zone of mineral deposits, as efflorescence on alum slates, in caves, and as a volcanic sublimate. It is associated with jarosite, KFe^{3+}_{3}(SO_{4})_{2}(OH)_{6}, and cuprian melanterite (pisanite), (Fe^{2+},Cu^{2+})SO_{4}·7H_{2}O, at Quetena, Chile.
