= Potassium alum =

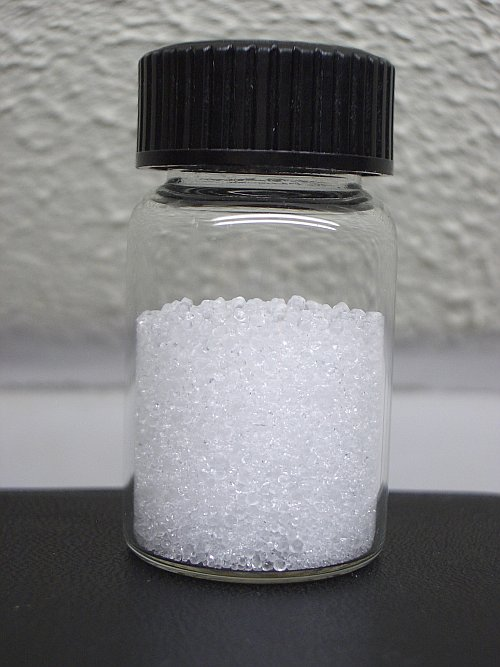

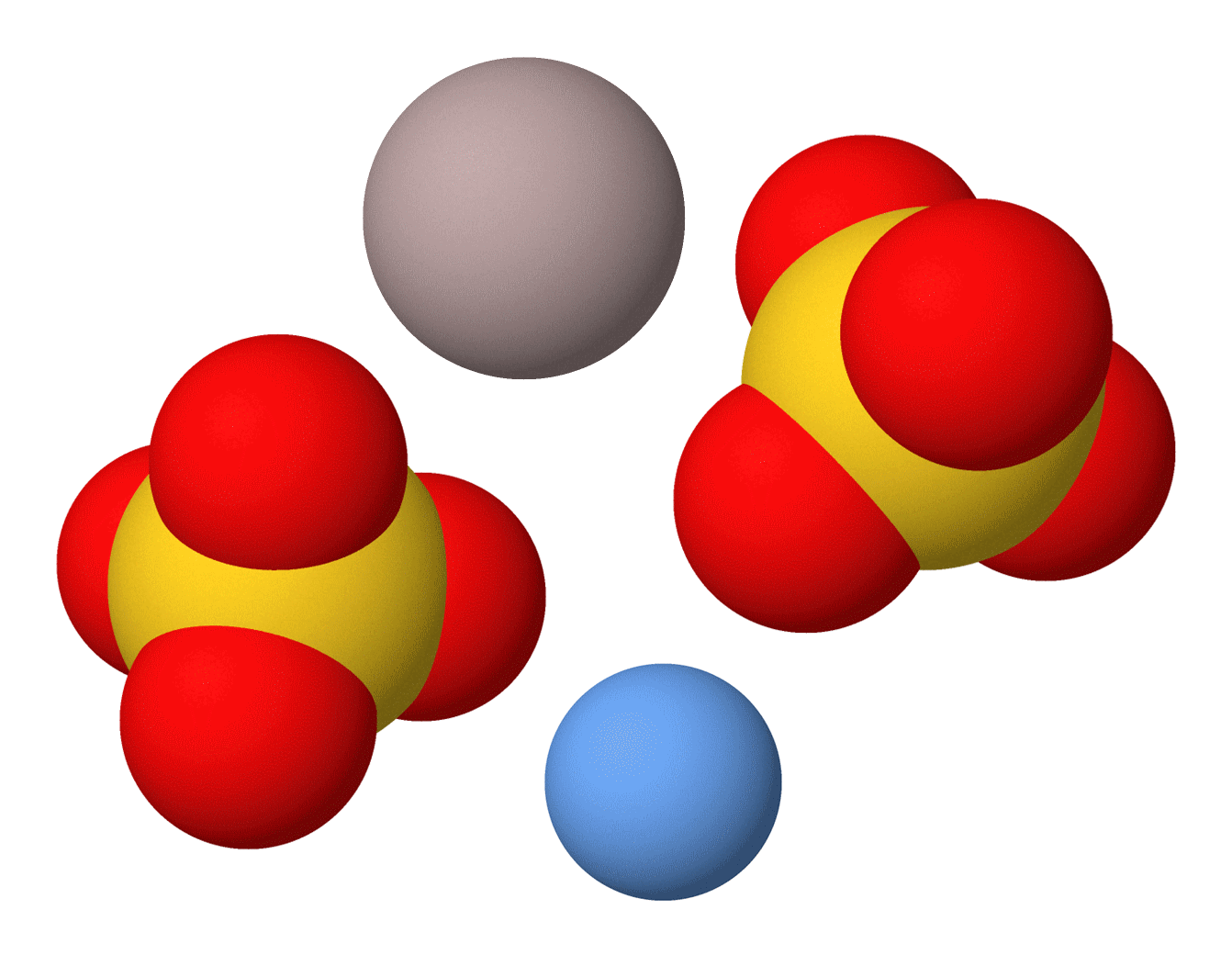

Names
- IUPAC name Potassium alum
- Other names: Potassium alum sulfate; Potash alum; Alum-(K)

Identifiers
CAS Number	10043-67-1; (dodecahydrate): 7784-24-9
3D model (JSmol)	Interactive image; (dodecahydrate): Interactive image
ChEBI	CHEBI:86463; (dodecahydrate): CHEBI:86465
ChemSpider	23239; (dodecahydrate): 56418
DrugBank	DB09087
ECHA InfoCard	100.112.464
EC Number	233-141-3; (dodecahydrate): 616-521-7
E number	E522 (acidity regulators, ...)
KEGG	(dodecahydrate): D01724
PubChem CID	24856; (dodecahydrate): 62667
UNII	09OXB01F3O; (dodecahydrate): 1L24V9R23S
CompTox Dashboard (EPA)	DTXSID401018678; (dodecahydrate): DTXSID401018678
- InChI: InChI=1S/Al.K.2H2O4S/c;;2*1-5(2,3)4/h;;2*(H2,1,2,3,4)/q+3;+1;;/p-4; (dodecahydrate): InChI=1S/Al.K.2H2O4S.12H2O/c;;2*1-5(2,3)4;;;;;;;;;;;;/h;;2*(H2,1,2,3,4);12*1H2/q+3;+1;;;;;;;;;;;;;;/p-4 Key: GNHOJBNSNUXZQA-UHFFFAOYSA-J
- SMILES: [O-]S(=O)(=O)[O-].[O-]S(=O)(=O)[O-].[Al+3].[K+]; (dodecahydrate): O.O.O.O.O.O.O.O.O.O.O.O.[O-]S(=O)(=O)[O-].[O-]S(=O)(=O)[O-].[Al+3].[K+]

Properties
Chemical formula	KAl(SO_{4})_{2}·12H_{2}O
Molar mass	258.192 g/mol (anhydrous); 474.37 g/mol (dodecahydrate)
Appearance	White crystals
Odor	Watery metallic
Density	1.725 g/cm^{3}
Melting point	92 to 95 °C (198 to 203 °F; 365 to 368 K)
Boiling point	Decomposes at 200 °C (392 °F; 473 K)
Solubility in water	6.01 g/100 g (20°C); 109 g/100 g (90 °C)
Solubility in other solvents	Insoluble in acetone
Refractive index (n_{D})	1.4564

Hazards
NFPA 704 (fire diamond)	0 0 0
- Except where otherwise noted, data are given for materials in their standard state (at 25 °C [77 °F], 100 kPa). verify (what is ?) Infobox references

Potassium alum, potash alum, or potassium aluminium sulfate is a chemical compound defined as the double sulfate of potassium and aluminium, with chemical formula KAl(SO_{4})_{2}. It is commonly encountered as the dodecahydrate, KAl(SO_{4})_{2}·12H_{2}O. It crystallizes in an octahedral structure in neutral solution and cubic structure in an alkali solution with space group Pa3̅ and lattice parameter of 12.18 Å. The compound is the most important member of the generic class of compounds called alums, and is often called simply alum.

Potassium alum is commonly used in water purification, leather tanning, dyeing, fireproof textiles, and baking powder as E number E522. It also has cosmetic uses as a deodorant, as an aftershave treatment and as a styptic for minor bleeding from shaving.

== History ==
Historically, potassium alum was used extensively in the wool industry from Classical antiquity, during the Middle Ages, and well into 19th century as a mordant or dye fixative in the process of turning wool into dyed bolts of cloth.

=== Antiquity ===
==== Egypt ====
Potassium alum was also known to the Ancient Egyptians, who obtained it from evaporites in the Western desert and reportedly used it as early as 1500 BCE to reduce the visible cloudiness (turbidity) in the water.

==== Mesopotamia ====
According to the expert on Middle Eastern history of chemistry Martin Levey, potassium alum is one of the few compounds known to the ancients that can be found relatively pure in nature, as well as one of only a few chemicals used in Mesopotamian chemical technology that can be identified with certainty. Both native and imported potassium alum was used. Together with other agents, potassium alum was used in glass-making, tanning, and in the dyeing of cloth, wood, and possibly hair. A tanning process using potassium alum is described in tablets from the first millennium BCE. When Levey wrote his article in 1958, no description of the dyeing process had been found, so it is not known how potassium alum was used in it. In Mesopotamian medicine potassium alum was used extensively, for example against itch, jaundice, some eye condition, and unidentified ailments.

According to Levey, potassium alum was used in "classical times" as a flux when soldering copper, in the fireproofing of wood, and in the separation of silver and gold, but that there is no evidence that these uses existed in Mesopotamia.

==== Greece ====
The production of potassium alum from alunite is archaeologically attested on the island Lesbos. This site was abandoned in the 7th century but dates back at least to the 2nd century CE.

==== Rome ====
Potassium alum was described under the name alumen or salsugoterrae by Pliny, and it is clearly the same as the stypteria (στυπτηρία) described by Dioscorides. However, the name alum and other names applied to this substance — like misy, sory, chalcanthum, and atramentum sutorium — were often applied to other products with vaguely similar properties or uses, such as iron sulfate or "green vitriol".

==== India and China ====
Potassium alum is mentioned in Ayurvedic texts namely Charak Samhita, Sushurta Samhita, and Ashtanga Hridaya with the name such as sphaṭika kṣāra, phitkari or saurashtri. It is used in traditional Chinese medicine with the name mingfan .

=== Middle Ages ===
In the 13th and 14th centuries, alum (from alunite) was a major import from Phocaea (Gulf of Smyrna in Byzantium) by Genoans and Venetians (and was a cause of war between Genoa and Venice) and later by Florence. After the fall of Constantinople, alunite (the source of alum) was discovered at Tolfa in the Papal States (1461). The textile dyeing industry in Bruges, and many locations in Italy, and later in England, required alum to stabilize the dyes onto the fabric (make the dyes "fast") and also to brighten the colors.

=== Modern era ===
==== England ====
Potassium alum was imported into England mainly from the Middle East, and, from the late 15th century onwards, the Papal States for hundreds of years. Its use there was as a dye-fixer (mordant) for wool (which was one of England's primary industries, the value of which increased significantly if dyed). These sources were unreliable, however, and there was a push to develop a source in England especially as imports from the Papal States ceased following the excommunication of Henry VIII.

With state financing, attempts were made throughout the 16th century, but without success until the early 17th century. An industry was founded in Yorkshire to process the shale, which contained the key ingredient, aluminium sulfate, and made an important contribution to the Industrial Revolution. One of the oldest historic sites for the production of alum from shale and human urine are the Peak alum works in Ravenscar, North Yorkshire. By the 18th century, the landscape of northeast Yorkshire had been devastated by this process, which involved constructing 100-foot (30 m) stacks of burning shale and fuelling them with firewood continuously for months. The rest of the production process consisted of quarrying, extraction, steeping of shale ash with seaweed in urine, boiling, evaporating, crystallisation, milling and loading into sacks for export. Quarrying ate into the cliffs of the area, the forests were felled for charcoal and the land polluted by sulfuric acid and ash.

==== Identification of the formula ====
In the early 1700s, Georg Ernst Stahl claimed that reacting sulfuric acid with limestone produced a sort of alum. The error was soon corrected by Johann Pott and Andreas Marggraf, who showed that the precipitate obtained when an alkali is poured into a solution of alum, namely alumina, is quite different from lime and chalk, and is one of the ingredients in common clay.

Marggraf also showed that perfect crystals with properties of alum can be obtained by dissolving alumina in sulfuric acid and adding potash or ammonia to the concentrated solution. In 1767, Torbern Bergman observed the need for potassium or ammonium sulfates to convert aluminium sulfate into alum, while sodium or calcium would not work.

At the time, potassium ("potash") was believed to be exclusively found on plants. However, in 1797, Martin Klaproth discovered the presence of potassium in the minerals leucite and lepidolite.

Louis Vauquelin then conjectured that potassium was likewise an ingredient in many other minerals. Given Marggraf and Bergman's experiments, he suspected that this alkali constituted an essential ingredient of natural alum. In 1797 he published a dissertation demonstrating that alum is a double salt, composed of sulfuric acid, alumina, and potash. In the same journal volume, Jean-Antoine Chaptal published the analysis of four different kinds of alum, namely, Roman alum, Levant alum, British alum and alum manufactured by himself, confirming Vauquelin's results.

== Characteristics ==
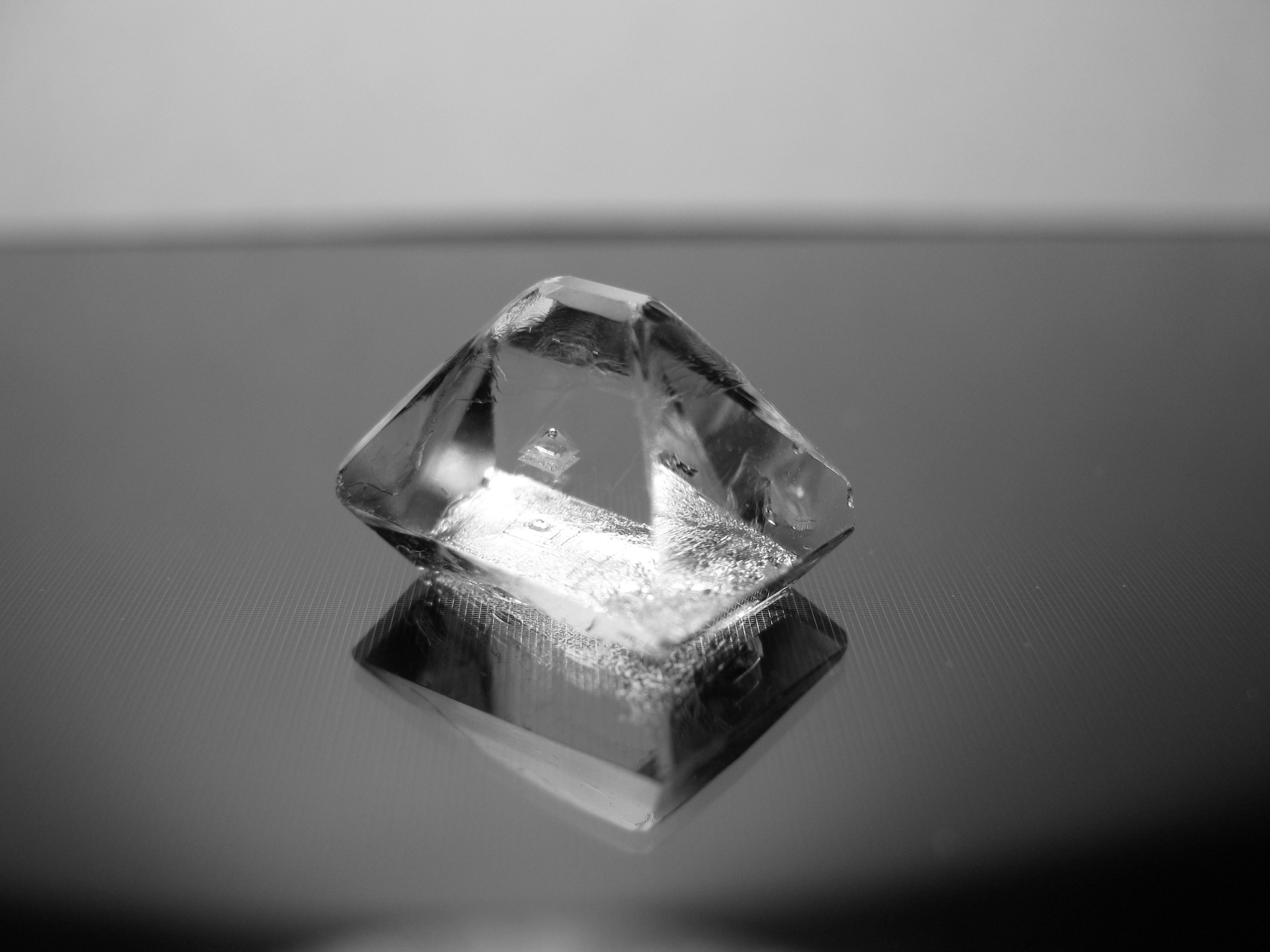
Octahedral potassium alum crystal with unequal distribution of the face area

Potassium alum crystallizes in regular octahedra with flattened corners and is very soluble in water. The solution is slightly acidic and is astringent to the taste. Neutralizing a solution of alum with potassium hydroxide will begin to cause the separation of Al(OH)_{3}, which redissolves with excess hydroxide.

When heated to nearly a red heat, it gives a porous, friable mass, which is known as "burnt alum". It fuses at 92 °C (198 °F) in its own water of crystallization.

== Natural occurrence ==
Potassium alum dodecahydrate occurs in nature as a sulfate mineral called alum-(K), typically as encrustations on rocks in areas of weathering and oxidation of sulfide minerals and potassium-bearing minerals.

In the past, potassium alum has been obtained from alunite (KAl(SO_{4})_{2}·2Al(OH)_{3}), mined from sulfur-containing volcanic sediments. Alunite is an associate and likely potassium and aluminium source. It has been reported at Vesuvius, Italy; east of Springsure, Queensland; in Alum Cave, Tennessee; Alum Gulch, Santa Cruz County, Arizona and the Philippine island of Cebu.

In order to obtain alum from alunite, it is calcined and then exposed to the action of air for a considerable time. During this exposure it is kept continually moistened with water, so that it ultimately falls to a very fine powder. This powder is then lixiviated with hot water, the liquor decanted, and the alum allowed to crystallize.

The undecahydrate also occurs as the fibrous mineral kalinite (KAl(SO_{4})_{2}·12H_{2}O).

== Industrial production ==
Potassium alum historically was mainly extracted from alunite.

Potassium alum is now produced industrially by adding potassium sulfate to a concentrated solution of aluminium sulfate. The aluminium sulfate is usually obtained by treating minerals like alum schist, bauxite and cryolite with sulfuric acid. If much iron should be present in the sulfate then it is preferable to use potassium chloride in place of potassium sulfate.

== Uses ==
=== Medicine and cosmetics ===
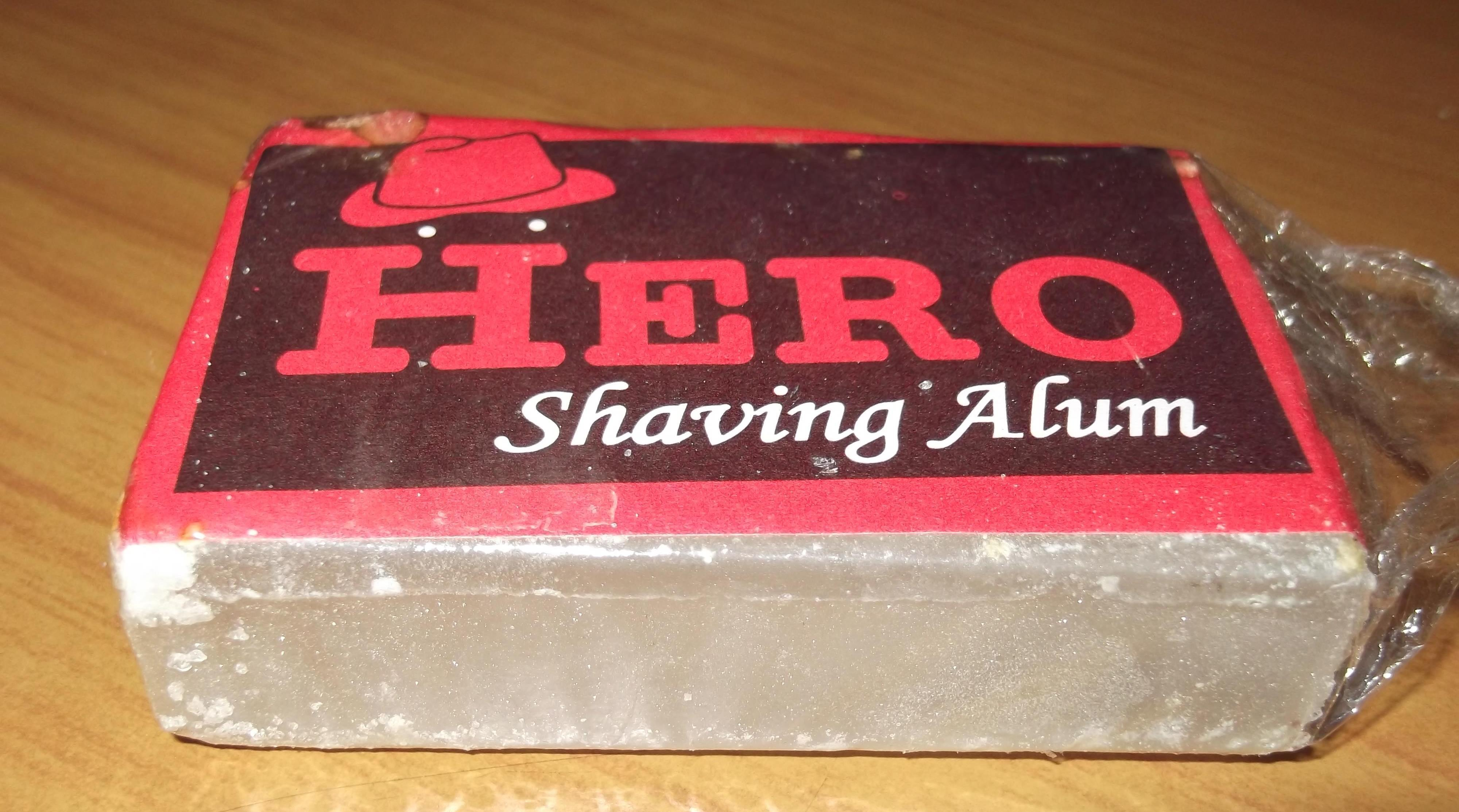
An ammonium alum block sold as an astringent in pharmacies in India (where it is widely known as "Fitkiri" (Bengali), "Fitkari" (Hindi)

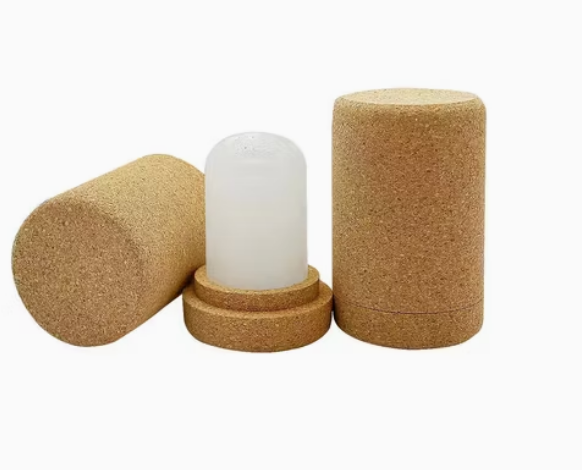
Crystal deodorant utilizing potash alum (potassium alum) in sustainable cork packaging

Potassium alum is used in medicine mainly as an astringent (or styptic) and antiseptic.

Styptic pencils are rods composed of potassium alum or aluminum sulfate, used topically to reduce bleeding in minor cuts (especially from shaving) and abrasions, nosebleeds, and hemorrhoids, and to relieve pain from stings and bites. Potassium alum blocks are rubbed over the wet skin after shaving.

Potassium alum is also used topically to remove pimples and acne, and to cauterize aphthous ulcers in the mouth and canker sores, as it has a significant drying effect to the area and reduces the irritation felt at the site. It has been used to stop bleeding in cases of hemorrhagic cystitis and is used in some countries as a cure for hyperhidrosis.

It is used in dentistry (especially in gingival retraction cords) because of its astringent and hemostatic properties.

Potassium and ammonium alum are the active ingredients in some antiperspirants and deodorants, acting by inhibiting the growth of the bacteria responsible for body odor. Alum's antiperspirant and antibacterial properties contribute to its traditional use as an underarm deodorant. It has been used for this purpose in Europe, Mexico, Thailand (where it is called sarn-som), throughout Asia and in the Philippines (where it is called tawas). Today, potassium or ammonium alum is sold commercially for this purpose as a "deodorant crystal". Beginning in 2005 the US Food and Drug Administration no longer recognized it as a wetness reducer, but it is still available and used in several other countries, primarily in Asia.

Potassium alum was the major immunologic adjuvant used to increase the efficacy of vaccines, and has been used since the 1920s. But it has been almost completely replaced by aluminium hydroxide and aluminium phosphate in commercial vaccines.

Alum may be used in depilatory waxes used for the removal of body hair or applied to freshly waxed skin as a soothing agent.

=== Culinary ===
Potassium alum may be an acidic ingredient of baking powder to provide a second leavening phase at high temperatures (although sodium alum is more commonly used for that purpose). For example, potassium alum is frequently used in leavening of youtiao, a traditional Chinese fried bread, throughout China.

Alum was used by bakers in England during the 1800s to make bread whiter. This was theorized by some, including John Snow, to cause rickets. The Sale of Food and Drugs Act 1875 (38 & 39 Vict. c. 63) prevented this and other adulterations.

Potassium alum, under the name "alum powder", is found in the spice section of many grocery stores in the US. Its chief culinary use is in pickling recipes, to preserve and add crispness to fruit and vegetables.

=== Flame retardant ===
Potassium alum is used as a fire retardant to render cloth, wood, and paper materials less flammable.

=== Tanning ===
Potassium alum is used in leather tanning, in order to remove moisture from the hide and prevent rotting. Unlike tannic acid, alum doesn't bind to the hide and can be washed out of it.

=== Dyeing ===
Alum has been used since antiquity as mordant to form a permanent bond between dye and natural textile fibers like wool. It is also used for this purpose in paper marbling.

=== Chemical flocculant ===
Potassium alum has been used since remote antiquity for purification of turbid liquids. It is still widely used in the purification of water for drinking and industrial processes water, treatment of effluents and post-storm treatment of lakes to precipitate contaminants.

Between 30 and 40 ppm of alum for household wastewater, often more for industrial wastewater, is added to the water so that the negatively charged colloidal particles clump together into "flocs", which then float to the top of the liquid, settle to the bottom of the liquid, or can be more easily filtered from the liquid, prior to further filtration and disinfection of the water. Like other similar salts, it works by neutralizing the electrical double layer surrounding very fine suspended particles, allowing them to join into flocs.

The same principle is exploited when using alum to increase the viscosity of a ceramic glaze suspension; this makes the glaze more readily adherent and slows its rate of sedimentation.

=== Lake pigments ===
Aluminum hydroxide from potassium alum serves as a base for the majority of lake pigments.

=== Dissolving iron and steel ===
Alum solution has the property of dissolving steels while not affecting aluminium or base metals. Alum solution can be used to dissolve steel tool bits that have become lodged in machined castings.

=== Other ===
In traditional Japanese art, alum and animal glue were dissolved in water, forming a liquid known as dousa (ja:礬水), and used as an undercoat for paper sizing.

Alum is an ingredient in some recipes for homemade modeling compounds, often called "play clay" or "play dough", intended for use by children.

Potassium alum was formerly used as a hardener for photographic emulsions (films and papers), usually as part of the fixer. It has now been replaced in that use by other chemicals.

== Toxicology and safety ==
Potassium alum may be a weak irritant to the skin when used as a deodorant.

== See also ==
- Ammonium aluminium sulfate
- Alum
