= Acid mantle =

Natural barrier on the surface of human skin

The acid mantle is a very thin, delicate, slightly acidic film covering the entire surface of human skin, serving as a protective barrier against pathogens and reduces body odor. The acidic pH at the skin's surface is primarily maintained by free amino acids and α-hydroxy acids (lactic acids) excreted from sweat; free fatty acids and amino acids from sebum; and urocanic acid and pyroglutamic acid. While the viable epidermis below the stratum corneum has a neutral pH of around 7.0, the surface pH of the skin's acid mantle typically ranges between 4.5 and 6.5, with an average assumption of 5.0 to 6.0.

== Formation and maintenance ==
The acidic pH at the skin's surface is mainly maintained by free amino acids and α-hydroxy acids (lactic acids) excreted from sweat; free fatty acids and amino acids from sebum; and urocanic acid and pyroglutamic acid.

== Role ==
The acid mantle, and its acidic pH, is important for the biological processes that are important for epidermal barrier function.

== Controversy on acidity ==
Recent research has challenged these proposed ranges, finding that healthy human skin naturally tends to return to acidity levels below 5.0 when left untouched by skincare products or water for extended periods. An ideal pH value of 4.7 has been identified, with some individuals showing levels as low as 4.3. Subjects with a skin pH below 5.0 exhibited significantly less scaling, higher hydration levels, and better skin flora presence compared to those with higher pH levels, suggesting better overall skin condition.

The acidic surface pH is crucial for the growth conditions of resident skin microbiota, which play a vital role in maintaining skin health. Human skin and its microbiota have a mutually beneficial symbiotic relationship, with the skin providing an optimal environment for resident microbiota while the microbiota help reinforce the skin's immunity by preventing colonization by harmful pathogens and contributing to skin acidification.

Skin care products that lower skin pH to 4.0–4.5 help maintain resident microbiota on the skin, whereas alkaline personal care products promote their dispersal.
