= Cutex =

American nail care brand

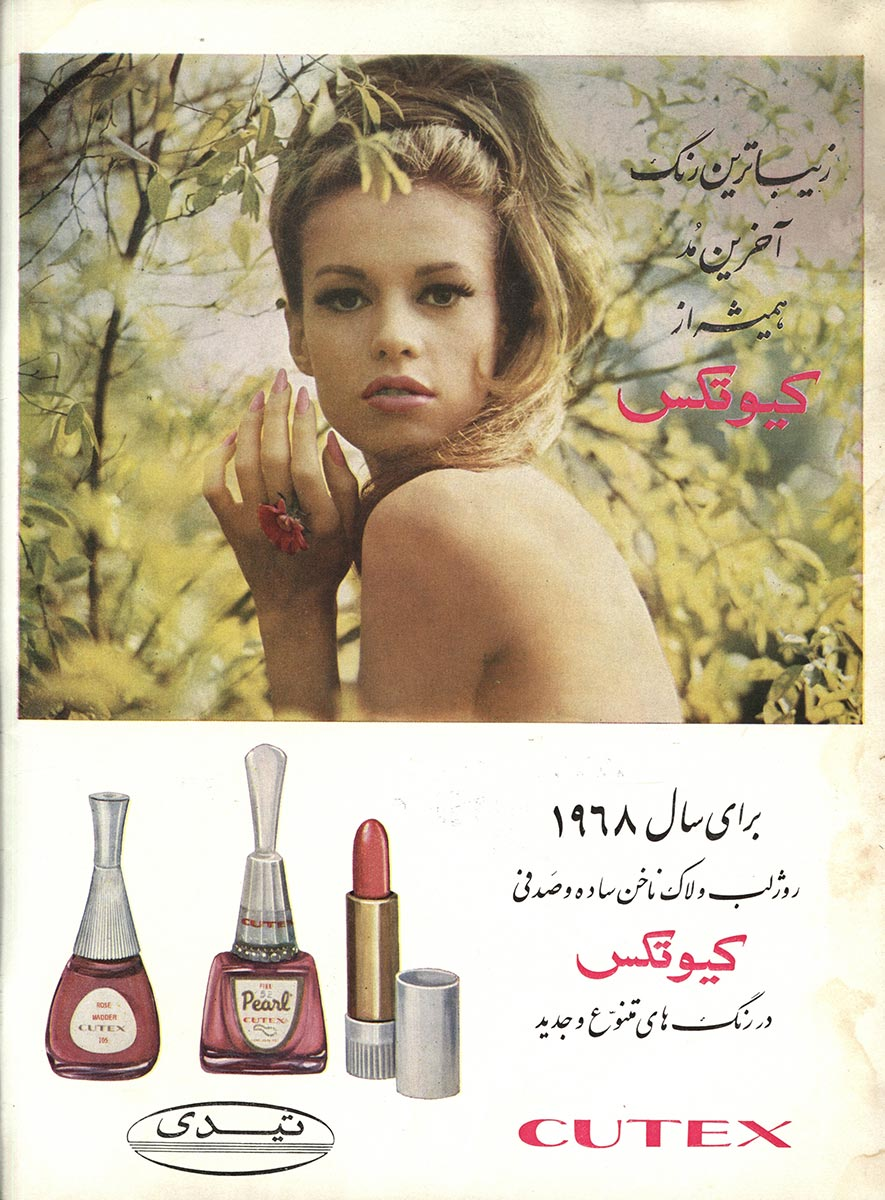
Example of Cutex ad. This advertisement appeared in the Persian magazine Zan-e Rooz, Issue 148 - 6 January 1968

Cutex is an American brand of nail care products, owned by Revlon, Inc. The original product was developed and established in 1911 by Northam Warren Company, based in Stamford, Connecticut.

== History ==
Northam Warren created the first fingernail cuticle remover and nail polish in 1911. Cutex introduced nail tints in 1914, and a liquid nail polish for the first time in 1917. The product took a long time to catch on; in 1927, it was reported as being a fad in London. In 1928, the company introduced an acetone-based nail polish remover that was safe for home and helped lead to the mass adoption of liquid nail polish. Cutex was a major nail care brand in the twentieth century.

=== Ownership changes and continued production ===
In 1960 Northam Warren was acquired by Chesebrough Ponds company. At the time, Cutex nail polish was being sold in 109 countries.

In April 1997, Carson Inc. purchased the Cutex product line for sale in the U.S. and Puerto Rico for $41 million. The following year, in December 1998, Carson sold Cutex to the Shansby Group, in order to focus on its hair care line as well as reduce debt. As part of the sale, Carson retained the nail and lip-coloring product lines. Shansby Group later entered into a joint venture with Medtech Labs to form the publicly traded company, Prestige Brands, which included Cutex.

Prestige maintained ownership of Cutex until September 2010, when it sold the brand to Arch Equity Partners. In 2016, Arch Equity Partners sold the Cutex Brands portfolio company to Revlon Consumer products.

== Products ==
Cutex has offered nail care and lip-coloring product lines. Cutex has released additional products and lines over the years, including its Advanced Revival and Baseworx products in 2012.
