= Helene Curtis Industries, Inc. =

American cosmetics and beauty parlor products firm

Helene Curtis Industries, Inc., was an American cosmetics and beauty parlor products firm headquartered in Chicago. The company acquired a hair-coloring line through the acquisition of a competitor business. Later the retailer diversified into the field of personal care products, manufacturing Degree, among other items.

== Corporation history ==
Helene Curtis was founded in Chicago in 1927 as the National Mineral Company by partners Gerald Gidwitz and Louis Stein. The company began by manufacturing a facial mudpack product, sold to beauty salons nationwide. The partners soon shifted the company's emphasis to haircare products (also sold to beauty salons), starting with a line of "machineless" waving pads, drastically simplifying the permanent wave process.

The company developed Lanolin Creme Shampoo, one of the country's first detergent-based shampoos, in the mid-1930s. The popularity of the shampoo, available only in beauty salons, prompted the company to follow it up with Suave Hairdressing in 1937. The demand for the hair tonic became so great that the company began manufacturing small retail sizes for salon resale. Suave would eventually become one of the company's flagship product lines.

During World War II, the company's name changed to National Industries, Inc., and factories were converted to manufacture non-haircare-related items for the war effort, including aircraft gun turrets, electric motors and radar equipment.

After the war, National Industries shifted back to producing personal care products. The company was renamed Helene Curtis, after the first names of partner Louis Stein's wife and stepson. Suave Hairdressing and Lanolin Creme Shampoo were soon introduced for general retail sale, and quickly began outselling the competition. In March 1948, Kraft Foods purchased property owned by the company to use for its offices and warehouses, and Helene Curtis relocated to a new corporate headquarters and manufacturing facility.

In 1949 Helene Curtis developed the generic term "hairspray" for its new aerosol product, Spraynet. Other successful and effective products introduced during the 1950s included the spray-on deodorant Stopette (acquired in 1956 from its founder, Chicago-based chemist and inventor Jules Montenier) and a nonprescription dandruff shampoo called Enden. These two products were advertised on television during such shows as What's My Line? and The Gale Storm Show, helping to make Stopette the best selling deodorant on the market, a position it maintained for several years.

The company expanded its product line with several acquisitions, including Kings Men male toiletries, Lentheric fragrances, and Studio Girl cosmetics. By the mid-1950s, Helene Curtis products were being manufactured and sold in 25 countries. In 1956, Helene Curtis went public after 32 years of private ownership (although the Gidwitz family held most of the voting shares until the company's 1996 takeover by Unilever).

In the early 1960s the company began to build on the success of its Suave brand, introducing shampoos, creme rinses, and wave sets. In 1961 Helene Curtis's stock was listed on the New York Stock Exchange, and by the middle of the decade the company had licensed its products in 81 countries. Also in 1961, Helene Curtis Industries began to challenge Avon in the field of door-to-door cosmetics sales.

Ronald J. Gidwitz, son of co-founder Gerald Gidwitz, took over as CEO in 1985.

In the 1970s and 1980s, Suave shampoo was one of the best selling in America, due largely to an effective advertising campaign touting Suave's similar quality, but much lower price, when compared to more expensive salon and name brands. As a result of this success, Suave's personal care lines was extended into deodorants, skin creams and other products. the company followed up by introducing the equally successful line of Finesse and (the professional-caliber) Salon Selectives brands. By 1989, Suave, Finesse and Salon Selectives were among the top ten national shampoo brands.

In 1990 Helene Curtis introduced the Degree antiperspirant, at that time the company's most successful new product launch. With a formula activated as body heat rises, and aided by a $50 million advertising campaign, Degree quickly found a large share of the market, achieving the company's market share goal for the brand's first year in only eight months. By the end of fiscal year 1992, Helene Curtis had attained the billion dollar mark with total sales of $1.02 billion.

As the decade of the 1990s progressed, despite its best efforts, record sales, facilities expansion, and advertising budgets approaching $80 million and up, it became clear that Helene Curtis was too small compared to its larger rivals. The firm did not have the resources to compete on an international scale with the likes of Procter & Gamble and Unilever. In February 1996, Helene Curtis agreed to be acquired by Unilever for about $770 million.

In contract law, the company is known for the 1963 case Helene Curtis Industries, Inc. v. United States, in which the Superior knowledge doctrine was born.

In 1998, the beauty manufacturer had a production site in Rolling Meadows, Illinois.
