= Deodorant =

Substance applied to the body to prevent or mask body odor

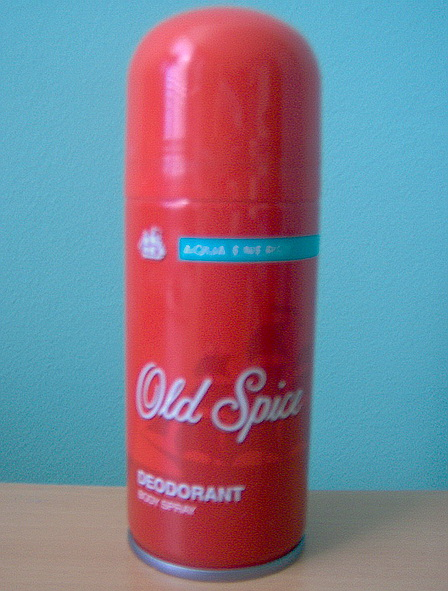
An Old Spice deodorant spray can

A deodorant is a substance applied to the body to prevent or mask body odor caused by bacterial breakdown of perspiration, such as that in the armpits, groin, hands, or feet. There are two types of deodorant; aerosol (spray) and stick. A subclass of deodorants called antiperspirants prevents sweating itself, typically by blocking sweat glands. Antiperspirants are used on a wider range of body parts at any place where sweat would be inconvenient or unsafe. Other types of deodorant allow sweating but prevent bacterial action on sweat.

The first commercial deodorant was introduced and patented in the late nineteenth century by Edna Murphey, an inventor in Philadelphia, Pennsylvania. The product was briefly withdrawn from the market in the US. The modern formulation of the antiperspirant was patented by Jules Montenier on January 28, 1941. This formulation was first found in "Stopette" deodorant spray, which Time magazine called "the best-selling deodorant of the early 1950s."

Deodorant has been linked to breast cancer in the media, but there has not been any reliable data found that deodorant causes cancer.

== Overview ==
The human body produces perspiration (sweat) via two types of sweat gland: eccrine sweat glands which cover much of the skin and produce watery odourless sweat, and apocrine sweat glands in the armpits and groin, which produce a more oily "heavy" sweat containing a proportion of waste proteins, fatty acids and carbohydrates, that can be metabolized by bacteria to produce compounds that cause body odor. In addition, the vagina produces secretions which are not a form of sweat but may be undesired and also masked with deodorants.

Human perspiration of all types is largely odorless until its organic components are fermented by bacteria that thrive in hot, humid environments. The human underarm is among the most consistently warm areas on the surface of the human body, and sweat glands readily provide moisture containing a fraction of organic matter, which when excreted, has a vital cooling effect. When adult armpits are washed with alkaline pH soap, the skin loses its protective acid mantle (pH 4.5–6), raising the skin pH and disrupting the skin barrier. Many bacteria are adapted to the slightly alkaline environment within the human body, so they can thrive within this elevated pH environment. This makes the skin more than usually susceptible to bacterial colonization. Bacteria on the skin feed on the waste proteins and fatty acids in the sweat from the apocrine glands and on dead skin and hair cells, releasing trans-3-methyl-2-hexenoic acid in their waste, which is the primary cause of body odor.

Underarm hair wicks the moisture away from the skin and aids in keeping the skin dry enough to prevent or diminish bacterial colonization. The hair is less susceptible to bacterial growth and therefore reduces bacterial odor. The apocrine sweat glands are inactive until puberty, which is why body odor often only becomes noticeable at that time.

Deodorant products work in one of two ways – by preventing sweat from occurring, or by allowing it to occur but preventing bacterial activity that decomposes sweat on the skin.

== History ==
=== Deodorants ===
In 1888, the first modern commercial deodorant, Mum, was developed and patented by a U.S. inventor in Philadelphia, Pennsylvania, Edna Murphey; the small company was bought by Bristol-Myers in 1931. In the late 1940s, Helen Barnett Diserens developed an underarm applicator based on the newly invented ball-point pen. In 1952, the company began marketing the product under the name Ban Roll-On. The product was briefly withdrawn from the market in the U.S., but it is once again available at retailers in the U.S. under the brand Ban. In the UK it is sold under the names Mum Solid and Mum Pump Spray. Chattem acquired the Ban deodorant brand in 1998 and subsequently sold it to Kao Corporation in 2000.

In 1903, the first commercial antiperspirant was Everdry. The modern formulation of the antiperspirant was patented by Jules Montenier on January 28, 1941. This patent addressed the problem of the excessive acidity of aluminum chloride and its excessive irritation of the skin, by combining it with a soluble nitrile or a similar compound. This formulation was first found in "Stopette" deodorant spray, which Time magazine called "the best-selling deodorant of the early 1950s." "Stopette" gained its prominence as the first and long-time sponsor of the game show What's My Line?; it was later eclipsed by many other brands once the 1941 patent expired.

Between 1942 and 1957, the market for deodorants increased 600 times to become a $70 million market. Deodorants were originally marketed primarily to women, but by 1957 the market had expanded to male users, and estimates were that 50% of men were using deodorants by that date. The Ban Roll-On product led the market in sales.

In the early 1960s, the first aerosol antiperspirant in the marketplace was Gillette's Right Guard, whose brand was later sold to Henkel in 2006. Aerosols were popular because they let the user dispense a spray without coming in contact with the underarm area. By the late 1960s, half of all the antiperspirants sold in the U.S. were aerosols, and continued to grow in all sales to 82% by the early 1970s. However, the late 1970s saw two developments which greatly reduced the popularity of these products. First, in 1977 the U.S. Food and Drug Administration banned the active ingredient used in aerosols, aluminium zirconium chemicals, due to safety concerns over long term inhalation. Second, the U.S. Environmental Protection Agency limited the use of chlorofluorocarbon (CFC) propellants used in aerosols due to awareness that these gases can contribute to depleting the ozone layer. As the popularity of aerosols slowly decreased, stick antiperspirants became more popular.

== Classification ==
=== Deodorant ===
In the United States, deodorants are classified and regulated as cosmetics by the U.S. Food and Drug Administration (FDA) and are designed to eliminate odor. Deodorants are often alcohol-based. Alcohol initially stimulates sweating but may also temporarily kill bacteria. Other active ingredients in deodorants include sodium stearate, sodium chloride, and stearyl alcohol. Deodorants can be formulated with other, more persistent antimicrobials such as triclosan that slow bacterial growth or with metal chelant compounds such as EDTA. Deodorants may contain perfume fragrances or natural essential oils intended to mask the odor of perspiration. Some of the first patented deodorants used zinc oxide, acids, ammonium chloride, sodium bicarbonate (has limination of 10%) and formaldehyde (which is now known as a carcinogen), and some of these ingredients were messy, irritating to the skin.

Crystal deodorant, or natural deodorant crystal, contains the active ingredient rock crystals potassium alum or ammonium alum, which prevents bacterial action on sweat. These have gained popularity as an alternative health product, in spite of concerns about possible risks related to aluminum (see below – all alum salts contain aluminum in the form of aluminum sulphate salts) and contact dermatitis.

Whole body deodorant, in the forms of sprays, sticks, creams, and wipes, is used by men and women to mask odors on all parts of the body, including armpits, breasts, genitals, and feet. It is considered safe to use all over the body, even in sensitive areas. Various active ingredients may be used, including alpha hydroxy acids such as mandelic acid, which have antibacterial properties and/or deodorizing effects.

Vaginal deodorant, in the form of sprays, suppositories, and wipes, is often used by women to mask vaginal secretions. Vaginal deodorants can sometimes cause dermatitis.

=== Deodorant antiperspirant ===
In the United States, deodorants combined with antiperspirant agents are classified as drugs by the FDA. Antiperspirants attempt to stop or significantly reduce perspiration and thus reduce the moist climate in which bacteria thrive. Aluminium chloride, aluminium chlorohydrate, and aluminium-zirconium compounds, most notably aluminium zirconium tetrachlorohydrex gly are frequently used in antiperspirants. Aluminium chlorohydrate and aluminium-zirconium tetrachlorohydrate gly are the most frequent active ingredients in commercial antiperspirants. Aluminium-based complexes react with the electrolytes in the sweat to form a gel plug in the duct of the sweat gland. The plugs prevent the gland from excreting liquid and are removed over time by the natural sloughing of the skin. The metal salts work in another way to prevent sweat from reaching the surface of the skin: the aluminium salts interact with the keratin fibrils in the sweat ducts and form a physical plug that prevents sweat from reaching the skin's surface. Aluminium salts also have a slight astringent effect on the pores; causing them to contract, further preventing sweat from reaching the surface of the skin. The blockage of a large number of sweat glands reduces the amount of sweat produced in the underarms, though this may vary from person to person. Methenamine in the form of cream or spray is effective in the treatment of excessive sweating and attendant odor. Antiperspirants are usually best applied before bed.

== Product formulations and formats ==
=== Formulations ===
Common and historical formulations for deodorants include the following active ingredients:

- Aluminum salts (aluminum chlorohydrate, aluminum zirconium tetrachlorohydrex gly, and others) – used as the basis for almost all non-prescription (everyday) antiperspirants. The aluminum reacts within the sweat gland to form a colloid which physically prevents sweating.
- Alum (typically potassium alum or ammonium alum, also described as "rock alum," or "rock crystal," or "natural deodorant"). Alum is a natural crystalline product widely used both historically and in modern times as a deodorant, because it inhibits bacterial action. The word 'alum' is a historical term for aluminum sulfate salts, therefore all alum products will contain aluminum, albeit in a different chemical form from antiperspirants.
- Bactericidal products such as triclosan (TCS), octenidine dihydrochloride, and parabens kill bacteria on the skin.
- Alcohols and related compounds such as propylene glycol – these products can have both drying and bactericidal effects.
- Methenamine (hexamethylenetetramine, also known as hexamine or urotropin) is a powerful antiperspirant, often used for severe sweat-related issues, as well as prevention of sweating within the sockets of prosthetic devices used by amputees.
- Acidifiers and pH neutral products – deodorants that prevent bacterial action by enhancing (or at least, not depleting) the skin's natural slight acidity, known as the acid mantle, which naturally reduces bacterial action but can be compromised by typically alkaline soaps and skin products.
- Masking scents – other strong or overriding scents of a pleasing type may be used, used to mask bodily odors. Typically these are strongly smelling plant extracts or synthetic aromas.
- Activated charcoal and other products capable of absorbing sweat and/or smell. Although charcoal most often has a black color, the activated charcoal used in deodorants may be a very light color for aesthetic reasons.
- Less commonly used, products such as milk of magnesia (a thick liquid suspension of magnesium hydroxide) are sometimes used as deodorants. Many milk of magnesia products contain small amounts of sodium hypochlorite (bleach) at very low levels that are safe for ingestion and skin application. Sodium hypochlorite is a powerful bactericide, and it is possible that its presence in a product that can dry onto the skin, may explain this use as a deodorant. (Safety info: bleach is caustic and extremely poisonous, and can be lethal, in higher concentrations.)

== Health effects ==
After using a deodorant containing zirconium, the skin may develop an allergic, axillary granuloma response. Antiperspirants with propylene glycol, when applied to the axillae, can cause irritation and may promote sensitization to other ingredients in the antiperspirant. Deodorant crystals containing synthetically made potassium alum were found to be a weak irritant to the skin. Unscented deodorant is available for those with sensitive skin. Frequent use of deodorants was associated with blood concentrations of the synthetic musk galaxolide.

=== Aluminium ===
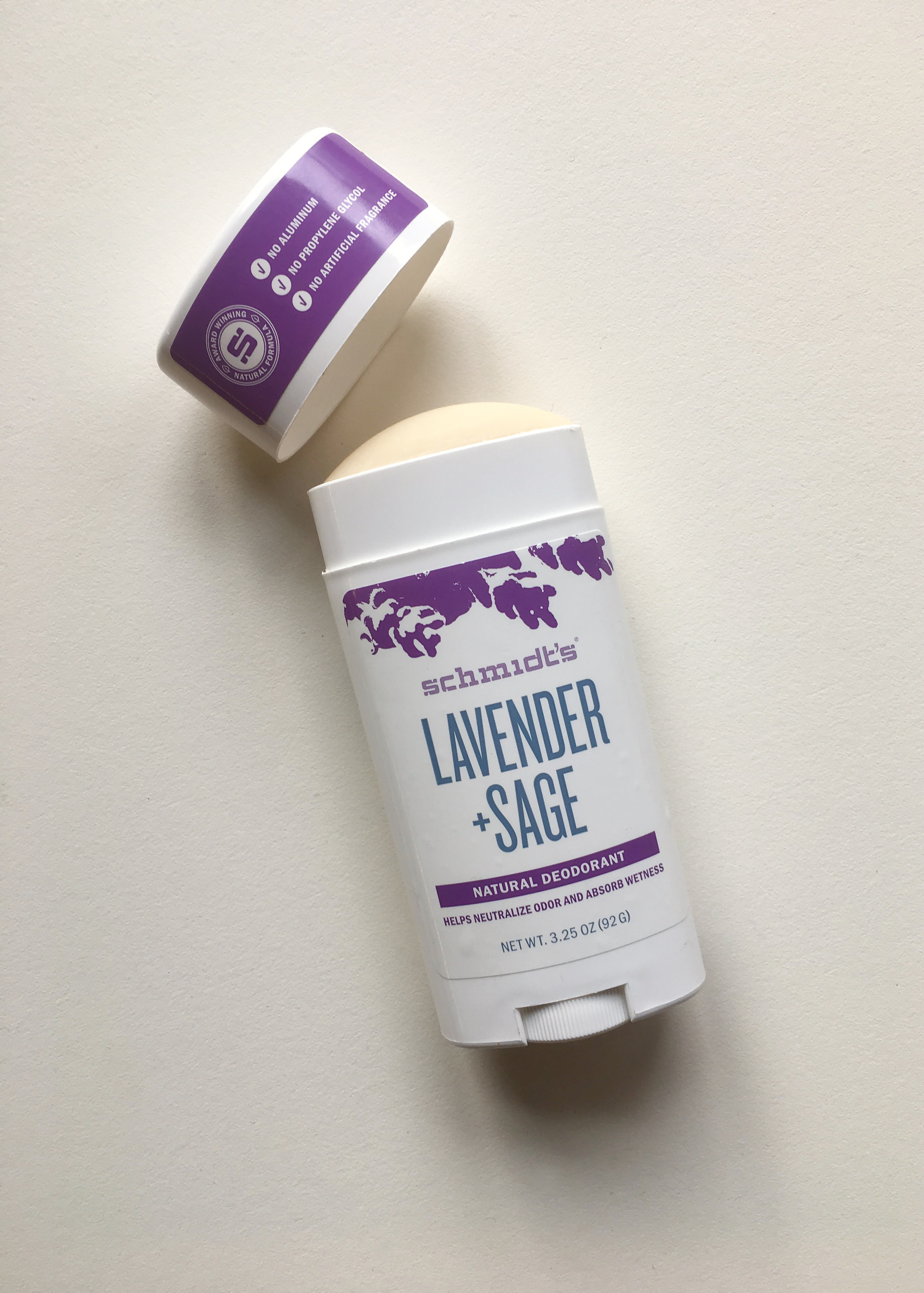
An aluminum-free deodorant, labeled "no aluminum"

Many deodorants and antiperspirants contain aluminium in the form of aluminium salts, such as aluminium chlorohydrate.

The US Food and Drug Administration, in a 2003 paper discussing deodorant safety, concluded that "despite many investigators looking at this issue, the agency does not find data from topical and inhalation chronic exposure animal and human studies submitted to date sufficient to change the monograph status of aluminum containing antiperspirants," therefore allowing their use and stating they will keep monitoring the scientific literature. Members of the Scientific Committee on Consumer Safety (SCCS) of the European Commission concluded similarly in 2015, that "due to the lack of adequate data on dermal penetration to estimate the internal dose of aluminium following cosmetic uses, risk assessment cannot be performed." In the light of new data in 2020 the SCCS considered aluminium compounds safe up to 6.25% in non-spray deodorants or non-spray antiperspirants and 10.60% in spray deodorants or spray antiperspirants.

==== Claims related to aluminium compounds in deodorants ====
Common ideas and marketing claims for aluminium in deodorants (including aluminum in alum products) include assertions:

- That aluminium in deodorants applied to the skin is a risk factor for some cancers (notably breast cancer) and some forms of dementia
- That aluminium in antiperspirants can enter the body (possibly through shaving cuts)
- That aluminium in alum "natural deodorant" products is "safer" because it is "too large" to enter the body

Of note, the parts of the body which are commonly shaved and also commonly treated with deodorants, such as the armpits, contain substantial deposits of subcutaneous fat. Shaving cuts would be extremely unlikely to penetrate sufficiently beyond the very outer layers of the skin, for much if any product to enter the bloodstream.

==== Alzheimer's disease ====
A 2014 review of 469 peer-reviewed studies examining the effect of exposure to aluminum products concluded "that health risks posed by exposure to inorganic Al[uminum] depend on its physical and chemical forms and that the response varies with route of administration, magnitude, duration and frequency of exposure. These results support previous conclusions that there is little evidence that exposure to metallic Al, the Al oxides or its salts increases risk for Alzheimer's disease, genetic damage or cancer."

=== Breast cancer ===
The claim that breast cancer is linked with deodorant use has been widely circulated and appears to originate from a spam email sent in 1999; however, there is no evidence to support the existence of such a link. The claim circulates in two forms:

- Antiperspirants block the "purging" of toxins which build up in the body and cause breast cancer: As sweat glands simply do not have this function, the claim is scientifically implausible. Perspiration from the eccrine sweat glands is 99% water, with some salt (sodium chloride) and only trace amounts of lactic acid (almost entirely processed in the liver), urea (almost entirely excreted by the kidneys), and only very small amounts of all other components. Perspiration from the apocrine sweat glands (those in the armpits and groin, which are more responsible for body odor) also include waste proteins, carbohydrates, and fatty acids which would otherwise be processed by other organs such as the liver.

It is possible that there has been confusion between sweat glands, and the lymph nodes deep within the armpits which form part of the immune system and help filter toxins, but if so, no evidence has been found of such "blocking" of lymph nodes, nor any plausible route by which this could result from deodorant use.

- Aluminum in antiperspirants can enter the body (possibly through cuts) and cause breast cancer: There is no current evidence to support this claim, nor any convincing evidence that it is true. A fact often cited to back up this claim is that more breast cancers occur in the part of the breast near the armpits. However, breast tissue is not evenly spread out, and the part of the breast near the armpit (the Tail of Spence) simply contains much more breast tissue than the other quadrants, making it much more likely that any cancer would occur in that location. See above for current scientific knowledge regarding aluminum in deodorants.

The National Cancer Institute states that "no scientific evidence links the use of these products to the development of breast cancer" and that "no clear evidence show[s] that the use of aluminum-containing underarm antiperspirants or cosmetics increases the risk of breast cancer," but also concludes that "[b]ecause studies of antiperspirants and deodorants and breast cancer have provided conflicting results, additional research would be needed to determine whether a relationship exists."

Another constituent of deodorant products that has given cause for concern are parabens, a chemical additive. However parabens do not cause cancer.

=== Kidney dysfunction ===
The FDA has "acknowledge[d] that small amounts of aluminum can be absorbed from the gastrointestinal tract and through the skin," leading to a warning "that people with kidney disease may not be aware that the daily use of antiperspirant drug products containing aluminum may put them at a higher risk because of exposure to aluminum in the product." The agency warns people with kidney dysfunction to consult a doctor before using antiperspirants containing aluminum.

=== Aerosol burns and frostbite ===
If aerosol deodorant is held close to the skin for long enough, it can cause an aerosol burn—a form of frostbite. In controlled tests, spray deodorants have been shown to cause temperature drops of over 60 °C in a short period of time.

== Clothing ==
Aluminium zirconium tetrachlorohydrex gly, a common antiperspirant, can react with sweat to create yellow stains on clothing. Underarm liners are an antiperspirant alternative that does not leave stains.

== See also ==
- Air freshener
- Aluminum chlorohydrate
- Perfume
