= Aluminium zirconium tetrachlorohydrex gly =

Antiperspirant chemical

Aluminium zirconium tetrachlorohydrex gly is the INCI name for a preparation used as an antiperspirant in many deodorant products. It is selected for its ability to obstruct pores in the skin and prevent sweat from leaving the body. Its anhydrous form gives it the added ability of absorbing moisture. It is sometimes called AZG, and contains a mixture of monomeric and polymeric Zr^{4+} and Al^{3+} complexes with hydroxide, chloride and glycine.

== Functions ==
Anhydrous aluminium zirconium tetrachlorohydrex gly functions by diffusing into the sweat gland and forming a colloidal "plug" which limits the flow of sweat to the skin surface. The plug is gradually broken down and normal sweating resumes.

== Clothing stains ==
When mixed with sweat, aluminium zirconium tetrachlorohydrex gly is thought to stain clothing with a yellowish tint. It can also cause a stiffening of the affected areas of clothing. If excessive amounts of aluminium zirconium tetrachlorohydrex gly mixed with sweat come in contact with a material, bleach marks may develop.

Excessive deposits of aluminium zirconium tetrachlorohydrex gly on clothing may be removed during washing by adding a chelating agent, such as the citrate ions from mixing lemon juice and baking soda, to the wash. Because only the conjugate base of citric acid can chelate, baking soda is necessary to neutralize the acid.
