= OxiClean =

American brand of household cleaners

- The current logo, in use since 2003

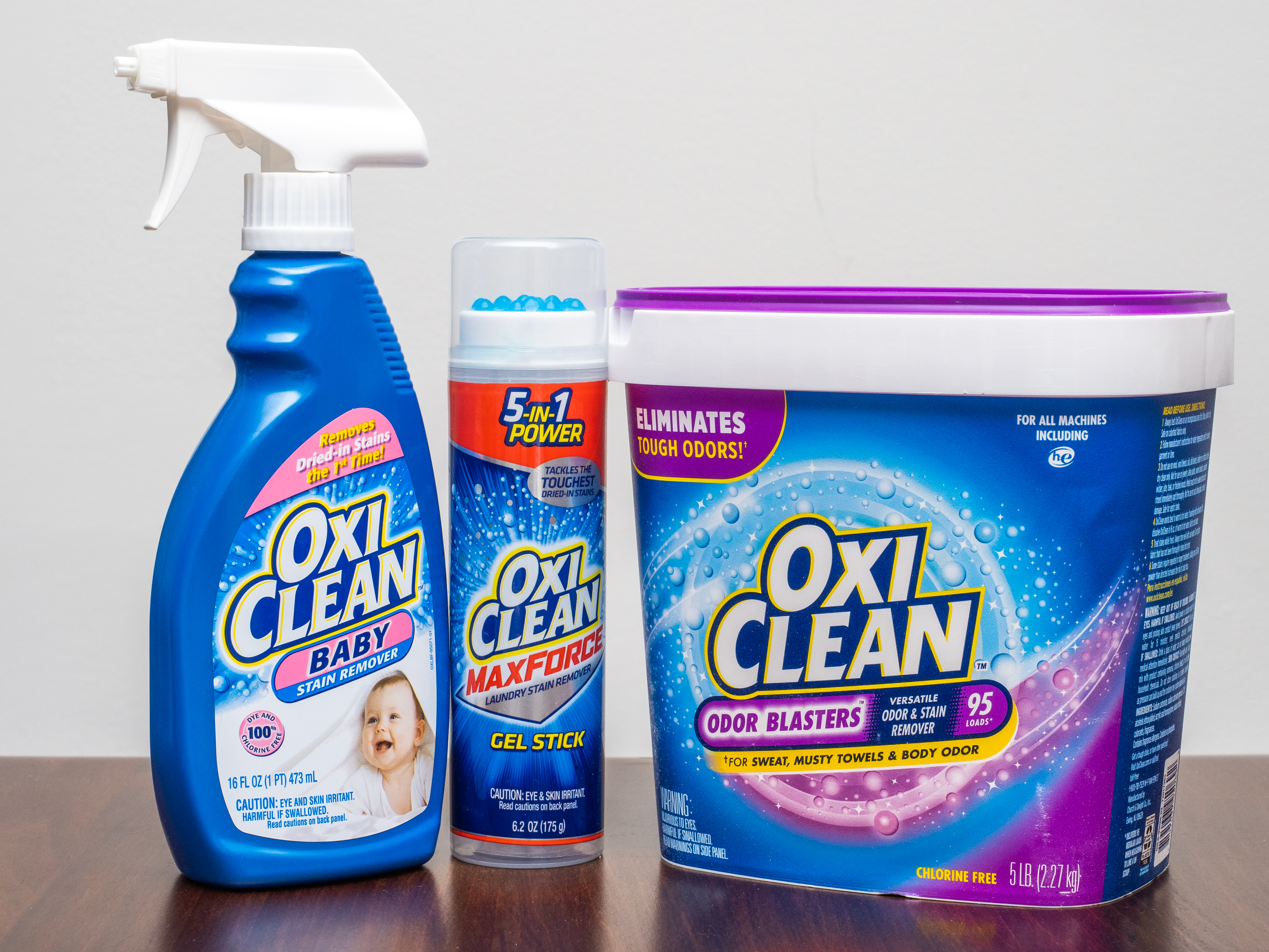
- Different OxiClean Products
- Product type: Stain remover Laundry detergent
- Current owner: Church & Dwight
- Country: United States
- Introduced: 1997
- Related brands: OxiClean Free Versatile Stain Remover; OxiClean Laundry Stain Remover; OxiClean MaxForce Spray; OxiClean Power Paks; OxiClean Triple Power Stain Fighter; OxiClean White Retriever; OxiClean Baby Stain Soaker; OxiClean Laundry Detergent
- Markets: Worldwide
- Previous owners: Orange Glo International
- Tagline: OxiClean Gets The Tough Stains Out!
- Website: oxiclean.com

OxiClean is an American brand of household cleaners, including OxiClean Versatile Stain Remover, which is a laundry additive, spot stain remover, and household cleaner marketed by Church & Dwight. It was formerly owned by Orange Glo International from its introduction in 1997 until it was acquired in 2006.

== History ==
When it was introduced by Orange Glo International in 1997, it was marketed through infomercials with Billy Mays in the US and Canada as a "miracle cleanser" starting in 2000.

Church & Dwight acquired the OxiClean brand, along with Orange Glo and several others, through its acquisition of Orange Glo International in 2006; at that point the OxiClean brand expanded into laundry detergent with the introduction of the OxiClean Detergent Ball, followed by OxiClean Liquid Laundry Detergent in 2014.

It continued to be endorsed by Mays until his death in 2009; the product is now seen endorsed by Mays' friend and co-worker Anthony Sullivan. Mays and Sullivan were featured on the show PitchMen on the Discovery Channel in which the product was featured on several occasions.

== Description ==
One of the active ingredients in OxiClean is sodium percarbonate (Na_{2}CO_{3}•H_{2}O_{2}), an adduct of sodium carbonate (Na_{2}CO_{3}) and hydrogen peroxide (H_{2}O_{2}). This breaks down into hydrogen peroxide when dissolved in water. These ingredients break down safely in the environment and leave no toxic byproducts.

Related products include OxiClean Laundry Stain Remover, OxiClean MaxForce Spray, OxiClean Power Paks, OxiClean Triple Power Stain Fighter, OxiClean White Revive and OxiClean Baby Stain Soaker. The Clorox Company has a competing product, Clorox 2, which has similar ingredients but also includes the activator TAED (tetraacetylethylenediamine) to convert the peroxide into peracetic acid (also known as peroxyacetic acid, or PAA). Another competing product, Biz Laundry Booster, has added enzymes to break down organic stains and claims to outperform OxiClean in some situations.
