= Bottle Tops =

Bottle Tops is a device that snaps on to most 12- and 16-ounce aluminum cans and turns them into resealable containers. It purports to also keep carbonation in the can, though that is disputed. The product is currently marketed by Telebrands, one of the leading direct-response marketing companies.

== Background and "Snap Capp" ==
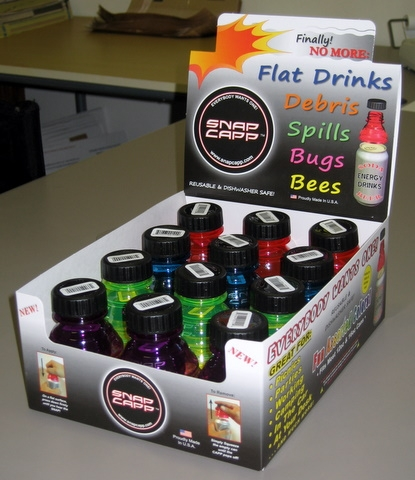
An early caddie of Snap Capps

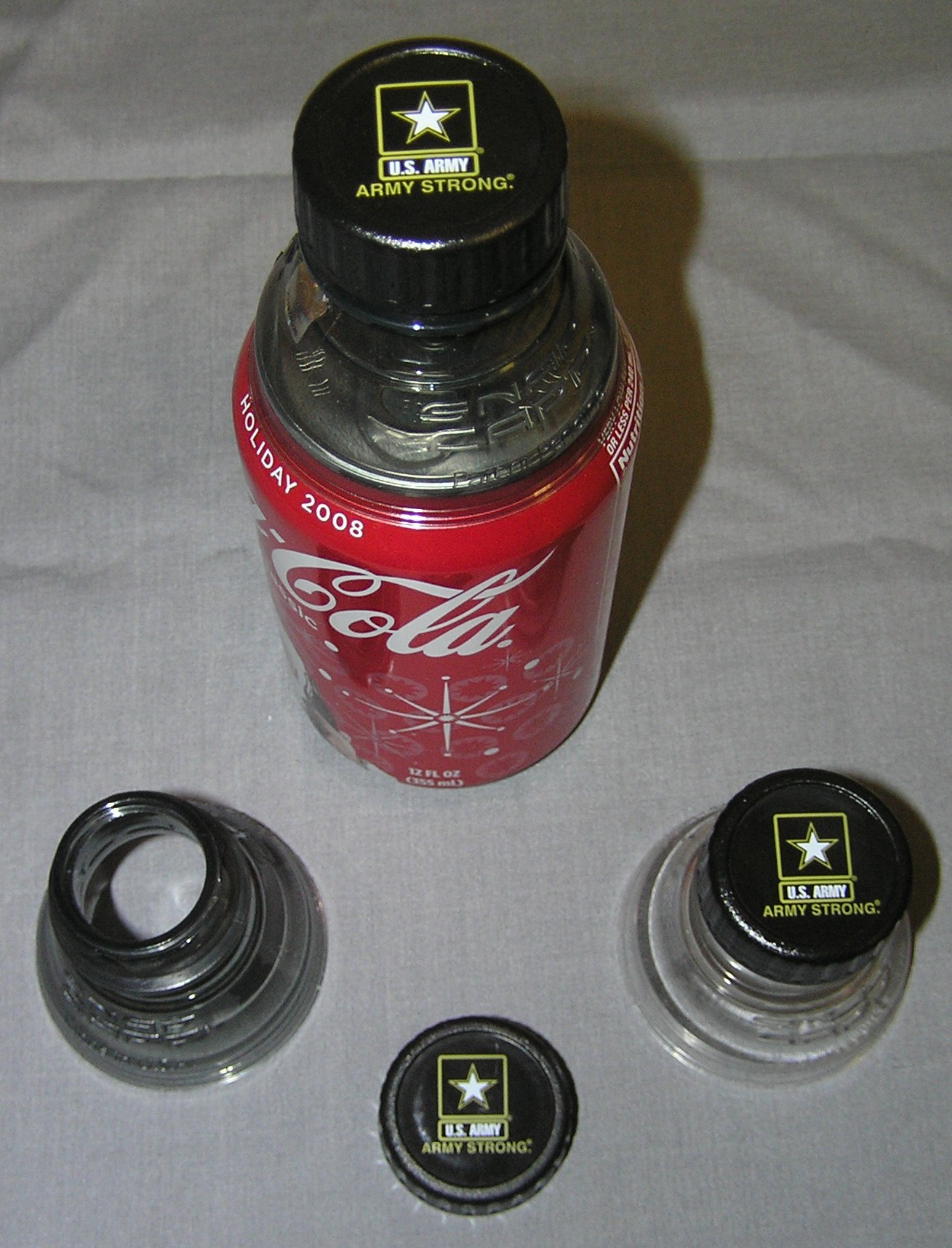
U.S. Army caps

Originally named the Snap Capp, the product was invented in Medford, Oregon by David Gran and Carl Stufflet (a heating and air-conditioning service manager), who became frustrated over repeatedly spilling his beer during a Disc golf competition. While camping later that day, Mr. Stufflet took out a knife and cut off the top of his plastic Pepsi bottle and melted it onto his can with a lighter, thereby creating the first Snap Capp.

The caps were one of the first PET plastics (polyethylene terephthalate) to ever be injection molded, and the first prototype was done by a company located out of Hemet, California named Ramko Manufacturing. Because of the extreme heating and cooling in the process, the molds were made with beryllium inserts.

The exclusive rights to market the caps were obtained by Allen Vallarta Wholesale, LLC in the summer of 2007, a company led by Bill Allen, a former Coca-Cola manager. Under Mr. Allen's directions, a handful of front line wholesalers such as Jeff Hammers, Steve Farrell, and Bill Banta took the product to thousands of stores, such as Walgreens, Bed Bath & Beyond, and Pilot Travel Centers.

In the fall of 2008, the U.S. Army purchased 150,000 "Army Strong" logoed caps for their recruiters to use as a promotional tool, which gave the new product serious validity as a strong new product line.

By early 2009, Allen Vallarta Wholesale was one of 50 U.S. companies to be invited to a prestigious Department of Commerce Trade Winds Forum in Warsaw, Poland, which Mr. Allen attended with his attorney, Eric Kaufman, and met with senior representatives of several European countries.

== Telebrands takeover ==
By the summer of 2009, Snap Capps were becoming so popular that Telebrands, arguably the largest "as seen on TV" company in the United States, took notice. By this time, over 5 million units had already been sold in less than two years out. Over a series of meetings and negotiations, including a meeting at 3:30 in the morning in southern Oregon with Mr. Allen and Telebrands' VP of new products, Raj Shahani, an agreement was made for Telebrands to take over marketing of the product and they renamed it "Bottle Tops" thereafter.
