= A. J. Khubani =

American businessman

- Born: Ajit "A. J." Khubani; December 16, 1959 (age 66); Weehawken, New Jersey, U.S.
- Occupations: Inventor, entrepreneur, market executive

Ajit "A. J." Khubani (born December 16, 1959) is an American inventor, entrepreneur and marketing executive. Known as the "Infomercial King," Khubani is the founder and CEO of the infomercial firm Telebrands and a pioneer of the infomercial industry. He is the creator of the original "As seen on TV" logo and category at retail.

== Early life ==
Khubani was born in Weehawken, New Jersey in 1959, and he was the first person in his family to be born in the United States. His father was an Indian immigrant and serial entrepreneur who eventually made enough money importing Japanese pocket-radios to move their family from their third-floor walkup in Union City, to a modest home in Lincoln Park. Khubani attended Boonton High School, graduating in 1978. He earned a degree in Business Administration with a minor in psychology from Montclair State University in 1984.

Khubani held many odd jobs until founding his business at age 23. He got his first job at age 11, delivering the Paterson Evening News for $10 per week. He continued on to work as a teenage busboy at Marriott Hot Shoppes, and then as a pizza delivery man, earning a promotion to pizzeria manager while still in high school.

While studying business administration at Montclair University, Khubani used his life savings, $20,000, to buy an ad in the National Enquirer advertising an AM/FM Walkman. Upon breaking even on the ad, he realized that he might be able to turn a profit. He began selling products in magazine and newspaper ads, earning his first million at 26 years old. He eventually recognized that TV would be a much stronger advertising medium for his products. His company, Telebrands, trailblazed direct-to-consumer (D2C) marketing through direct response advertising on television. Khubani designed the iconic red “As Seen on TV” logo in 1989, an emblem now widely adopted around the world.

== Business career ==
Khubani is the founder and CEO of Telebrands, a company that develops, markets, and distributes household items both direct-to-consumer and to major retail stores. Founded in 1983, Telebrands created billions of dollars in revenue. Khubani created the “As Seen on TV” departments at retail; this category is the second-largest producer of nonpharmaceutical revenue at drugstores nationwide, raking in approximately $350 billion annually.

Telebrands’ products are available in over 100,000 retail stores, including Walmart, CVS, Target, Walgreens, Bed, Bath, and Beyond, and 7-Eleven. Telebrands has sold over a hundred million units of “As Seen on TV” products; some of the most successful products are AmberVision Sunglasses, Star Shower, Pocket Hose, and PedEgg. As an inventor himself, Khubani currently holds 134 patents granted by the United States Patent and Trademark Office. The products are sold in over 120 countries.

== Intellectual property theft and lawsuits ==
The company has also been involved in a number of cases where victims alleged and ultimately proved willful intellectual property theft. Recent reporting shows that the company systematically infringes on intellectual property and has done so over 120 times.

In 1996 Khubani reached settlements with the Federal Trade Commission resolving charges that they violated the FTC's Mail or Telephone Order Merchandise Rule resulting in a $95,000 civil penalty.

The Federal Trade Commission obtained consumer redress against Khubani and Telebrands in 2009 resulting in a $7million settlement. The complaint charged that the advertisements for the Telebrands “Ab Force” belt were false and deceptive in violation of Sections 5 and 12 of the FTC Act.

The New Jersey Division of Consumer Affairs Filed a Five Count Action against Telebrands for Consumer Fraud Act Violations in 2014. Acting Attorney General John J. Hoffman said:

"As demonstrated by its alleged actions, Telebrands cannot be trusted to do right by its customers or to even honor its own 2001 pledge to follow our consumer protection laws. We are bringing this action to end the abusive business practices that Telebrands allegedly is inflicting upon consumers."

== Other activities ==
=== Education ===
Khubani has frequently guest lectured at Princeton University and at his alma mater, Montclair State University. At Princeton, Khubani served as chairman of Entrepreneurial Engineering within the School of Mechanical and Aerospace Engineering. Designed and taught by Khubani himself and by Dan Nosenchuck, associate professor of mechanical engineering, the entrepreneurial engineering course focuses on product conception and design.

At Montclair State University, Khubani was appointed to the business advisory board and is a longtime supporter of the Feliciano Center for Entrepreneurship and Innovation, often hosting and sponsoring the annual Startup Montclair Pitch Competition. The competition awards generous cash prizes to rising entrepreneurs to facilitate the launch of their new businesses. In 2014, Khubani received the Distinguished Alumni Award and delivered the keynote address to the graduates of Montclair University's School of Business.

=== Charity ===
Khubani has been heavily involved in supporting Children's Hope India, a nonprofit organization that provides education for underprivileged children in India and New York. He was also appointed Vice Chair of the board of The Bergen-Passaic Arc Foundation, a foundation that promotes and protects human rights of individuals with intellectual and developmental disabilities.

=== Personal life ===
Khubani lives in Miami Beach, Florida, with his wife. He and his wife, Poonam, had a modern arranged marriage in 1985 and have been happily married ever since. According to the New York Times, he invests his free time into maintaining a healthy lifestyle and spending time with family.

=== Public recognition ===
Khubani has received numerous accolades over the course of his career. Khubani has received awards from Target (Excellence in Home Merchandising), CVS (Vendor of the Year), Walmart, Dollar General, and many other retailers. In the direct response industry, he has been inducted into the Infomercial Hall of Fame, named one of 40 Most Influential People in DRTV by Response Magazine, and notably, granted the Marketer of the Year Award and the coveted Lifetime Achievement Award by the Electronic Retailing Association.

Khubani has also made TV appearances on news and talk-show programs such as ABC News, CNBC, Fox News, CNN, Good Morning America, The Today Show, The View, Dr. Phil, The Tonight Show, and Chelsey Lately. He regularly starred as “The Godfather of Direct Response” on Discovery Channel TV Show, Pitchmen, and featured in a film called Those Who Made It (2017), a film about Indian American entrepreneurs and their success stories.
