= SelecTV =

SelecTV may refer to:

- Select-TV, a Malaysian IPTV (Internet Protocol Television) provider for the hospitality and telecommunication sectors
- SelecTV (Australian television), a defunct Australian satellite based subscription television broadcasting service
- FreeCast (company), a US IPTV (Internet Protocol Television) aggregation service, marketed as both SelectTV and RabbitTV.
- SelecTV (American TV channel), a defunct subscription (Pay TV) television service that operated in the 1970s and 1980s
- Carlton Select, a defunct British cable and digital television channel previously branded as SelecTV
