= FEVA TV =

Canadian television channel

- FEVA TV logo
- Country: Canada
- Broadcast area: National
- Headquarters: Toronto, Ontario, Canada

Ownership
- Owner: Wells Multimedia Entertainment
- Key people: Wells Idahosa Okunbo (chairman); Robert Onianwah (president/CEO)

History
- Launched: August 28, 2014; 10 years ago

Links
- Website: www.fevatv.com

FEVA TV is a Canadian English language exempt Category B specialty channel that launched on August 28, 2014. The channel's name is an acronym for First Entertainment Voice of Africa, and a Caribbean English spelling of the word "fever." It was founded by Robert Onianwah and Dr. Idahosa Wells Okunbo, and is owned by Wells Multimedia Entertainment Inc.

FEVA TV is the first-ever television channel aimed at Black Canadians. It primarily airs general entertainment programming, including movies, music, comedies, dramas, documentaries, and talk shows.

== History ==
FEVA originated as an Internet-based video service in September 2013. Shortly after FEVA's launch, the owners began talks with television service providers to launch the service as a television channel. FEVA TV would officially launch as a television channel on August 28, 2014.

The following year, FEVA reached distribution agreements with Flow, which rolled out the channel in Summer 2015 to the Caribbean; including Antigua, Barbados, Curaçao, Grenada, Jamaica, Trinidad and Tobago, St. Lucia, and St. Vincent & the Grenadines.

In September 2016, FEVA launched in the United States as a digital sub-channel of WDFL-LD channel 18; a low-powered television station in Miami, Florida.

In Summer 2021, FEVA reached its first African distribution agreement with Azam TV, launching on its system in Tanzania, Uganda, Kenya, Burundi, Rwanda, and Malawi.

In February 2022, FEVA would go to Jamaica to shoot two episodes We Outside, an original series produced for the planned launch of FEVA Music. That same year, the Comcast/NBCUniversal-backed AfroLandTV partnered with Fast Channels TV and FEVA to launch a FEVA-branded FAST channel.

In August 2024, FreeCast announced it would distribute FEVA TV in the United States as a FAST channel.
