= BulbHead =

American direct response marketing company

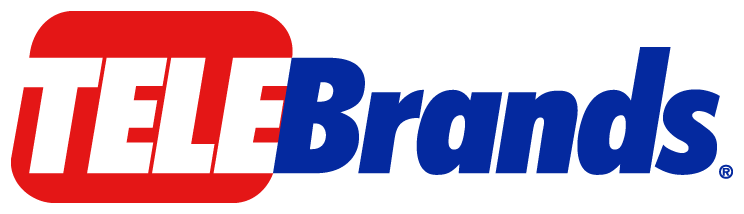
- Former logo as Telebrands.
- Formerly: Telebrands (1983–2024)
- Type: Private
- Industry: Inventions
- Founded: 1983
- Founder: A. J. Khubani
- Headquarters: Fairfield, New Jersey, United States
- Products: Items advertised on TV
- Website: www.bulbhead.com

BulbHead (formerly known as Telebrands) is an American direct response marketing company, and the original creator of the "As Seen On TV" logo and category of trade.

== History ==
The company's CEO A. J. Khubani started the company in 1983, creating print advertisements for his products in publications such as the National Enquirer. Telebrands was first based in Roanoke, Virginia, but in 1998 was moved to Fairfield, New Jersey. In 1986, Khubani began experimenting with television, producing three short form infomercials, one for an ultrasonic flea collar, one for a home bicycle exercise machine, and the third for AmberVision sunglasses. The company subsequently sold 15 million pairs of the AmberVision sunglasses.

Since 1983, BulbHead has sold hundreds of millions of "As Seen on TV" products including AmberVision sunglasses, the PedEgg, Doggy Steps, One-Second Needle, Pasta Boat, Jupiter Jack, Bottle Tops, Aluma Wallet, InstaBulb, Lint Lizard, Pet Rider, and Pocket Hose. The PedEgg foot file, launched in 2007, has sold over 45 million units as of 2013.

BulbHead's products are marketed using TV, internet, and print advertising and through retail chains in over 120 countries. BulbHead tends to have 10 to 12 products on store shelves, the most of any company in the direct-response television space.

BulbHead works with infomercial pitchmen, including the late Billy Mays and Anthony Sullivan. Telebrands and Khubani were featured in several episodes of the Discovery Channel TV series PitchMen. The show followed Mays and Sullivan as they searched for inventions to be sold by "As Seen On TV", with Khubani having the final say.

Once a month, the company hosts an "Inventors Day" where entrepreneurs in the U.S. come to pitch their invention to Khubani and his team. "Inventors Days" are held in several U.S. states, with past locations including New Jersey, Los Angeles, Las Vegas and Chicago. The company continues to launch products such as the Orgreenic line of non-stick cookware, the Olde Brooklyn Lantern, the Who Knew Books line of books, and Rabbit TV, a joint venture with William A. Mobley and Freecast Inc.

The company has also been involved in a number of cases where victims alleged and ultimately proved wilful intellectual property theft. Recent reporting shows that the company systematically infringes on intellectual property and has done so over 120 times. In one case, the jury awarded $31 million in damages and lawyers' fees to an inventor as they were found to be liable and also willful in infringing.
