= Don Lapre =

American salesman (1964–2011)

- Born: Donald D. Lapre; May 19, 1964; Providence, Rhode Island, U.S.
- Died: October 2, 2011 (aged 47); Florence, Arizona, U.S.
- Occupation: Television direct-response pitchman
- Years active: 1988–2011
- Spouse: Sally Redondo (m. 1988)

Donald D. Lapre (May 19, 1964 – October 2, 2011) was an American multi-level marketing (MLM) salesman and infomercial pitchman. His work involved product packages such as "Making Money Secrets" and "The Greatest Vitamin in the World."

Lapre was criticized as selling questionable business plans that often did not work for his clients. In June 2011, Lapre was charged with 41 counts of conspiracy, mail fraud, wire fraud, and promotional money laundering related to his internet businesses. He was arrested for failing to appear in court to face these charges.

He died on October 2, 2011, due to apparent suicide while in jail awaiting trial. The autopsy report stated he died of massive blood loss after cutting his own throat with a razor blade.

== Early life ==
Born in Providence, Rhode Island, and raised in a modest family environment by his parents, Wilfred and Shirley Lapre, Don had four siblings: brothers Mike and Brian, and sisters Debbie and Michelle. The family moved to Phoenix, Arizona, when Don was age 7. He later attended Sunnyslope High School, where he dropped out at age 16, motivated by the need to contribute to the family income and join his father's house-painting business, forgoing formal education in favor of immediate sales and labor opportunities. At age 18, Don worked as a retail manager at Gemco department store. In 1988, at age 24, he married Sally Redondo, his wife of an eventual 23 years; they had two daughters.

== Business ventures ==
A high-school dropout at age 16, Lapre considered himself a "born entrepreneur" and in 1983, at age 19, began a life of self-employment, starting as a painter. In 1988, he launched the 1828 Club, a dating service that collapsed within two months, leaving him with $35,000 debt and prompting a Chapter 7 bankruptcy filing. In 1990, now married, Lapre, together with his wife, co-founded Unknown Concepts, a credit repair business, offering $37 packages that promised customers access to guaranteed credit cards, loans, and discounted vacations. The business faced legal challenges, including a lawsuit by the Arizona Attorney General for violating the Consumer Fraud Act, leading to penalties over $5,000 and a ban from credit services. Lapre then began selling a 36-page booklet explaining how to recover a Federal Housing Administration insurance refund after paying off a home mortgage; he priced the booklet at $85 despite costing less than $1 to produce. He marketed the booklet through classified newspaper ads, generating over $1,000 daily in early sales.

In 1992, Lapre rose to prominence upon broadcasting The Making Money Show with Don Lapre, a half-hour infomercial delivered as an actual television program. The principal product was Lapre's "Money Making Secrets", a package of booklets & tapes discussing common-sense tips for placing ads and operating a "900"-number phone line business, charging $2.99 per minute for calls. Lapre suggested viewers could make money as easily as he had, famously claiming that by placing "tiny classified ads" in newspapers he was "able to make $50,000 a week from [his] tiny one-bedroom apartment". Buyers of the $40 package (discounted from an original $79.95) received booklets detailing ad placement strategies, audio tapes with instructional recordings, and tips on scaling operations. A 30-day money-back guarantee was advertised to build trust, though fulfillment varied. The product was marketed & sold through New Strategies, Ltd, whose parent company was Tropical Beaches, Inc.

By the mid-1990s, The Making Money Show had become one of the top 10 most frequently broadcast cable television infomercials, holding that title for several years, reaching broad audiences across the U.S. and generating millions in revenue for Lapre's operations through high-volume sales of the package. The program's success incorporated multi-level marketing (MLM) elements, as initial buyers were often contacted via telemarketing for upsells to advanced services, including additional psychic or entertainment 900-number lines that could cost hundreds or thousands of dollars. This approach amplified the scheme's reach, turning early customers into potential promoters while capitalizing on the era's growing fascination with home-based business opportunities.

In the early 2000s, Lapre expanded his business ventures beyond financial schemes into the health & wellness market by broadcasting infomercials launching "The Greatest Vitamin in the World" in January 2003 through his company Torica, LLC. The infomercials focused intensely on this one vitamin supplement product, promoting it as a comprehensive solution for optimal health—a revolutionary daily multivitamin. The retail price was set at $39.95 for a 30-day supply, plus $8.65 shipping. While the infomercials centered on the vitamin product, the actual business model was structured as a multi-level marketing (MLM) "business opportunity" built on multiple components, with sales facilitated by independent distributors who promoted the product via personal networks and digital channels, and a complex scheme involving "wealth-building" kits and internet advertising packages:

- "Wealth-building" kits: These packages blended nutritional supplement sales with instructions on placing internet ads or using a replicated website to recruit more participants.
- Internet advertising packages: Consumers were told they could earn commissions by acquiring customers to purchase vitamins through customized websites provided by Lapre's company; the sites were essentially ineffective and rampant with generic pop-up ads.

In July 2005, the Food and Drug Administration (FDA) warned Lapre about his making claims his vitamin supplement was intended as a drug for diseases such as diabetes, stroke, heart disease, insomnia, cancer, and arthritis. The FDA stated "[his] products [were] not generally recognized as safe and effective for the above referenced conditions." The FDA demanded Lapre immediately cease distributing or marketing the product with such claims to avoid further enforcement, including potential product seizures or injunctions. In April 2006, the FDA again warned Lapre about untruthful unsubstantiated claims after determining he had not fully corrected the violations. This action targeted ongoing false health claims on the product's websites. The FDA reiterated requirements for compliance, emphasizing that structure/function claims permissible for dietary supplements must avoid disease references, and warned of escalated legal actions if violations persisted.

Lapre's production of and frequent appearance in his varied infomercials earned him the nickname “King of Infomercials,” which is suggested he may have given himself. The nickname was media-used in news reports and obituaries, and he even referred to himself as such on his own website.

== Legal charges and arrest ==
Lapre's business dealings were widely purported as schemes through which he allegedly defrauded investors of millions of dollars by promising high returns on investments in internet casinos and other ventures while using the funds for personal luxury living, including high-end vehicles and a $1.2 million residential home in Paradise Valley, Arizona. Accusations later culminated in a June 2011 41-count indictment by a federal grand jury.

According to a June 15, 2011, Associated Press article, Lapre was indicted by a federal grand jury in Phoenix, Arizona, on June 8, 2011, on accusations of running a nationwide scheme to sell "worthless" internet businesses. Lapre allegedly employed deceptive tactics, such as fabricating earnings potential (e.g., claims of $50,000 monthly income from home-based operations), using scripted testimonials from paid actors, and creating false documentation like "sales kits" and bonus incentives that never materialized. To conceal the operation, he funneled proceeds through a network of shell companies and bank accounts under aliases, including United Marketing Group, LLC, and others controlled by family members. Federal prosecutors demonstrated these practices built on a pattern of prior deceptive conduct, accusing Lapre of bilking more than 226,000 victims out of nearly $52 million. He was charged with 41 counts of conspiracy, mail fraud, wire fraud, promotional money laundering, and transactional money laundering. A federal judge, Magistrate Judge Lawrence O. Anderson, issued on June 22, 2011, a bench warrant for Lapre after he failed to appear at his arraignment. At a subsequent detention hearing, U.S. District Judge Susan R. Bolton ordered Lapre detained without bond, determining he posed a flight risk and economic danger to the community given the fraud's scale and his history of evading authorities.

On June 27, 2011, Lapre was arrested in Tempe, Arizona, at a Life Time Fitness center, reportedly hiding out in a locker room of the 24/7 gym for a day and a half after failing to appear for his arraignment on federal fraud charges. Upon apprehension, Lapre was found to have serious self-inflicted knife wounds to his groin, leading authorities to believe Lapre had intended suicide by attempting to sever the femoral arteries in his legs. News reports confirm Lapre was taken to a local hospital where he underwent emergency surgery; the specific name of the medical facility was not publicly disclosed. Lapre was later arraigned at the hospital while recovering; a trial date of October 4, 2011, was set.

If at trial Lapre were to be found guilty on all charges, he would face a potential sentence of up to 25 years in federal prison and possibly as long as 60 years, depending on how the sentences for individual counts were applied.

== Death ==
Lapre was found dead on October 2, 2011, in his cell bed at Central Arizona Detention Center, where he was being held while awaiting trial, scheduled to begin just two days later, October 4, 2011. Authorities discovered his body at approximately 8:30 a.m. local time (MT), though the exact amount of time he was dead before being found is not publicly specified. His death was the result of apparent suicide; the autopsy report stated he died of "massive blood loss after cutting his own throat with a disposable razor blade." Authorities determined the incident a suicide due to finding at the scene the razor blade and seeing Lapre had wrapped himself in sheets to assumedly conceal the massive blood loss from anyone who might try to intervene and save him.

== In popular culture ==
- David Spade parodied Don Lapre in two sketches on television's Saturday Night Live on the following dates:
1. May 15, 1993 (Season 18, Episode 20), in a sketch titled "Don Lapre: Financial Freedom with a 900 Number".
2. January 8, 1994 (Season 19, Episode 10), in a sketch titled "The Road To Self-Improvement".
- John C. McGinley played Dick Dupre, a spoof of Don Lapre, in the 2006 film Puff, Puff, Pass; the film spoofed Lapre and depicted his fictional astrologer Melissa Lipnutz.
- An independent parody video, "Don Lapre Infomercial Spoof", uploaded in 2008 by comedian Dan Hughes, lampooned Lapre's pitch style through over-the-top reenactments of classified ad schemes, gaining a cult following online.
- Chat Pile’s 2022 song "Tropical Beaches, Inc." is about Don Lapre.
