= FreeCast =

American digital media company

FreeCast Inc
- Type: Private
- Industry: Video on demand, Streaming, Internet TV
- Founded: 2011
- Headquarters: Orlando, Florida, U.S.
- Area served: United States
- Key people: William Mobley (founder and CEO); Gary Engel (CMO)
- Products: Rabbit TV (discontinued); SelectTV; FreeCast Home
- Website: freecast.com

FreeCast, Inc. is an American digital media distribution company headquartered in Orlando, Florida. The company operates as an aggregation platform that helps users connect and manage their streaming subscriptions in one place and provides access to internet-delivered streaming channels, free ad-supported streaming television (FAST) channels, and over-the-air broadcast television through a unified interface.

== History ==
FreeCast was founded in 2011 by William Mobley, who is the CEO of the company. In its early years, FreeCast operated as a search engine for web video content, actively locating and categorizing a significant volume of new videos daily across 5000 categorized channels. Additionally, the company introduced a Facebook app that allowed users to watch video programming directly from their Facebook page.

=== Rabbit TV ===
Primary product of the company is Rabbit TV, which is a web-based virtual library of entertainment media created in collaboration with A. J. Khubani's company, Telebrands. In 2012, the company, in partnership with Telebrands, transformed its service into a physical device known as Rabbit TV. This product was subsequently sold through major U.S. retailers in the form of a USB stick, providing users with access to a web-based guide interface.

Rabbit TV functions by aggregating links to various digital media sources, including TV shows, news broadcasts, live sporting events, movies, music, and radio stations. Following the achievement of one million paid subscribers, FreeCast announced plans for further Rabbit TV development, including enhancements such as increased social media integration, compatibility with multiple devices, and the introduction of a la carte programming packages.

=== SelectTV ===
In 2017, FreeCast ended the partnership with Telebrands and Rabbit TV was discontinued. The company introduced a new platform called SelectTV which operates as an aggregation service which unifies the user's existing streaming subscriptions alongside 700 additional live and on-demand channels through SmartGuide interface. The service is accessible through internet as a software application on all Wi-Fi enabled devices including Smart TV's, streaming devices, mobile phones, tablets and computers.

=== FreeCast Home ===
In April 2023, FreeCast announced FreeCast Home at the NAB Show in Las Vegas. The system is a whole-home streaming device that integrates an ATSC 3.0 tuner to receive over-the-air NextGen TV signals alongside web-delivered linear and on-demand programming. The device includes local DVR storage which is expandable via USB and is priced at a one-time retail charge of $200.

In January 2024, FreeCast filed with the U.S. Securities and Exchange Commission for a direct listing on the Nasdaq stock exchange with a plan for existing stockholders to sell approximately 9 million shares in order to raise around $23 million. In June 2024, FreeCast added Free Movies Plus to its platform which is a FAST channel operated by OTT Studio.
