= Ray Lindstrom =

American entrepreneur

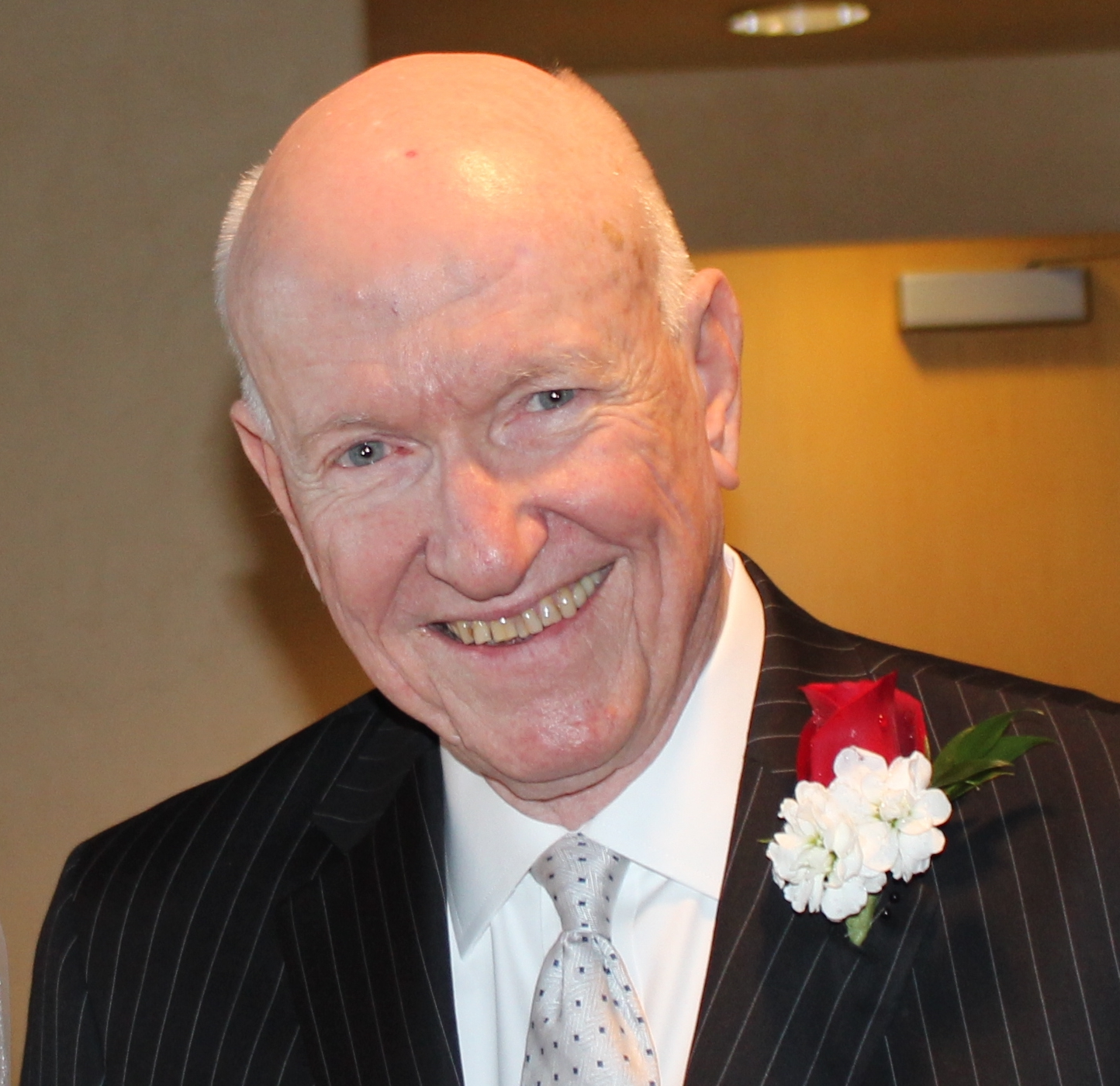
- Born: Illinois
- Education: University of Arizona
- Occupation: Entrepreneur
- Known for: Infomercials
- Website: www.raylindstrom.com

Ray Lindstrom is an American entrepreneur known as the father of the infomercial industry. He has been referred to as "Mr. Infomercial," creating more than 100 businesses and selling through television-only spots during the 1980s. Lindstrom also created the first program-length television commercial. He is a former media broadcaster and member of the Arizona Broadcasters Hall of Fame. In 2018 he released his auto-biography, FEARLESS! Confessions of a Serial Entrepreneur.

== Early life and education ==
Lindstrom was born and grew up in Illinois. He moved to Tucson, Arizona in high school where he later graduated from Catalina High School. He went on to graduate from the University of Arizona. As a kid, he did numerous odd jobs, including selling subscriptions to the Chicago Tribune where he was paid a new Schwinn bicycle by the newspaper.

== Career ==
=== Early career, Zoom Records and broadcasting ===
While still in High School in the late 1950s, Lindstrom started his first official business, Zoom Records, with friend Burt Schneider. Only 17 at the time, Lindstrom would find local bands, record them, press records, and promoted them to radio stations and record stores. Some of the artists they worked with included Pete Ronstadt and King Rock and the Knights. Lindstrom and Schneider went their own way after high school, each attending college and moving on to careers in advertising and broadcasting. Zoom Records is considered the first Rock label from Southern Arizona. In 2012, a documentary was created, showcasing the story of Zoom Records and its founders.

Lindstrom also worked as a weekend announcer at KTKT-FM while in high school. He would host the "Ray Lindstrom Show" starting in 1962 on KTKT-AM. In 1965 he moved to Phoenix and worked as an announcer/salesman at and later worked at KRUX radio, and KTAR-TV.

=== Advertising, Lindstrom & Jett, and telemarketing ===
Lindstrom is the co-founder of Lindstrom & Jett, an advertising agency he ran with Mac Jett starting in 1973. The agency did ad buys for local companies and was also the first television ad buyer for brands such as Peter Piper Pizza.

Lindstrom began creating a television based advertising platform that marketed amateur artwork, using it to promote trade shows where he sold oil paintings, jewelry, porcelain, and luxury items. The shows ran throughout the United States, Australia, New Zeleand, and other locations internationally.

The success of these shows led him to create a Christmas themed gift show. In 1978, he launched a Christmas gift show in Phoenix which helped promote locate businesses to compete with larger retailers. The show expanded to Chicago and Anaheim in its second year, and eight other cities the following year. Lindstrom would later leave Lindstrom & Jett to start other business ventures.

=== Infomercials and watches ===
In the 1980s, Lindstrom began doing infomercials and was the first to create a program-length television commercial. His first was how to get rich in real estate. He also ventured into the 900-number business, focusing on sports and entertainment trivia. He became known as the father of the infomercial industry, also being referred to as "Mr. Infomercial." He created businesses where he used infomercials to sell the products. In addition to "Get Rich with Real Estate," he created infomercials for people such as Zig Ziglar, Charles Givens, Bobby Singer, and Rita Davenport.

Lindstrom became a media owner in the 1990s, owning or partnering in radio stations that included KRIM-FM, KBAS-FM, and KWAZ-FM. He also produced a television game show called Money Mania. It was an interactive game show that allowed people to play from home by telephone. He also ventured into the watch business, owning several stores in Nevada and being dubbed the "Sultan of schlock" by Forbes. He opened his first store in 1993 with $14,000 and was making $4 million per year by 1998. Lindstrom would use his talent as an advertiser to running infomercial spots on hotel room televisions. He also earned the name "Mr. Watchman" and was featured on shows such as Today Show, CBS News with Dan Rather, and CBS Overnight News. He sold the shops in 2007, retiring to Tucson, Arizona.

In 2014, Lindstrom was inducted into the Arizona Broadcasters Hall of Fame. In 2018, he released his auto-biography, FEARLESS! Confessions of a Serial Entrepreneur.
