= Ed McMahon =

American television announcer (1923–2009)

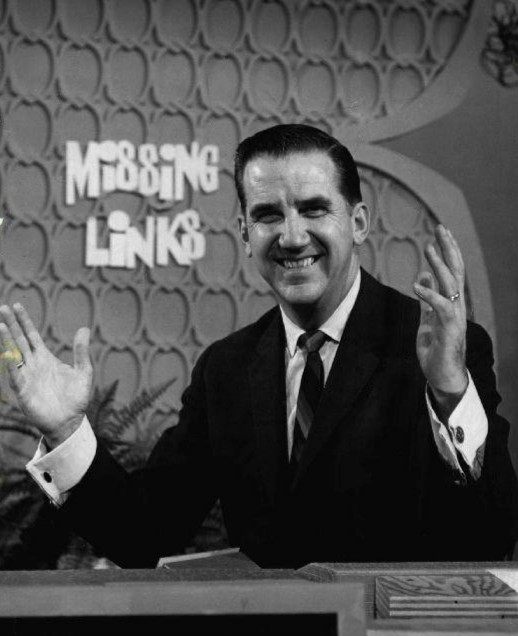
- McMahon in a 1960s publicity photo
- Born: Edward Leo Peter McMahon Jr. March 6, 1923; Detroit, Michigan, U.S.
- Died: June 23, 2009 (aged 86); Los Angeles, California U.S.
- Education: Catholic University of America (BA)
- Occupations: Comedian; actor; singer; game show host; announcer; spokesman; Marine Corps aviator
- Years active: 1957–2009
- Notable work: The Tonight Show, Star Search, TV's Bloopers & Practical Jokes
- Spouses: Alyce Ferrell (m. 1945; div. 1974) Victoria Valentine (m. 1976; div. 1989) Pam Hurn (m. 1992)
- Children: 5
- Military career
- Allegiance: United States
- Branch: United States Marine Corps; USMC Reserve
- Service years: 1941–1966
- Rank: Colonel
- Conflicts: World War II, Korean War, Vietnam War

Signature
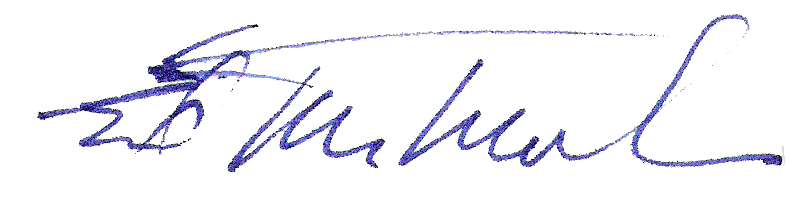

Edward Leo Peter McMahon Jr. (March 6, 1923 – June 23, 2009) was an American announcer, game show host, comedian, actor, singer, and combat aviator. McMahon and Johnny Carson began their association in their first TV series, the ABC game show Who Do You Trust?, appearing from 1958 to 1962. McMahon then made his famous thirty-year mark as Carson's sidekick and announcer on NBC's The Tonight Show Starring Johnny Carson from 1962 to 1992.

McMahon also hosted the original Star Search from 1983 to 1995, co-hosted TV's Bloopers & Practical Jokes with Dick Clark from 1982 to 1998, presented sweepstakes for American Family Publishers, annually co-hosted the Jerry Lewis MDA Telethon from 1973 to 2008 and anchored the team of NBC personalities conducting the network's coverage of the Macy's Thanksgiving Day Parade during the 1970s and 80s.

McMahon appeared in several films, including The Incident, Fun with Dick and Jane, Full Moon High and Butterfly. He had a brief screen time in the film version of the TV sitcom Bewitched and also performed in numerous television commercials. According to the staff of Entertainment Weekly, McMahon tops the list of the "50 greatest sidekicks ever".

== Early years ==
Ed McMahon was born on March 6, 1923, in Detroit, Michigan, to Edward Leo Peter McMahon Sr. (a fundraiser and an entertainer), and Eleanor (née Russell) McMahon. He was raised in Lowell, Massachusetts, often visiting his paternal Aunt Mary (Brennan) at her home on Chelmsford Street. McMahon went to Lowell High School at the same time as Jack Kerouac, occasionally sharing a beer with him. McMahon worked for three years as a carnival barker in Mexico, Maine, before serving as a fifteen-year-old bingo caller in the state. He put himself through college as a pitchman for vegetable slicers on the Atlantic City boardwalk. He landed his first broadcasting job at WLLH-AM in Lowell, and his television career launched in Philadelphia at WCAU-TV.

=== Military service ===
McMahon hoped to become a United States Marine Corps fighter pilot. Prior to the US entry into World War II, both the Army and Navy required pilot candidates to attend at least two years of college. McMahon studied at Boston College from 1940 to 1941. On The Howard Stern Show in 2001, he stated that after Pearl Harbor was attacked, the college requirement remained in effect and he still had to finish his two years of college before applying for Marine Corps flight training.

After completing the college requirement, McMahon began his primary flight training in Dallas. This was followed by fighter training in Pensacola, where he also earned his carrier landing qualifications and was designated as a Naval Aviator. He was a Marine Corps flight instructor in F4U Corsair fighters for two years, finally being ordered to the Pacific Fleet in 1945. However, the orders were canceled after the atomic bomb attacks on Hiroshima and Nagasaki.

As an officer in the Marine Corps Reserve, McMahon was recalled to active duty during the Korean War. He flew an OE-1 (the original Marine designation for the unarmed single-engine Cessna O-1 Bird Dog) spotter plane, serving as an artillery spotter for Marine artillery batteries and a forward air controller for Navy and Marine fighter bombers. He flew a total of 85 combat missions, earning six Air Medals. After the war, he remained in the Marine Corps Reserve, retiring in 1966 as a Colonel. In 1982, McMahon received a state commission as a Brigadier General in the California Air National Guard, an honorary award to recognize his support for the National Guard and Reserves.

=== The Catholic University of America ===
After World War II, McMahon studied at The Catholic University of America in Washington, D.C., under the GI Bill and graduated in 1949. He majored in speech and drama while studying under Gilbert Hartke and was a member of the Phi Kappa Theta fraternity. After graduation, McMahon led the effort to raise funds for a theater to be named for Hartke and attended its dedication in 1970 with Helen Hayes and Sidney Poitier. While working as Carson's sidekick during The Tonight Show, McMahon served as the president of the national alumni association from 1967 to 1971 and would often return to campus, especially for homecoming. During the university's centennial celebration in 1987, McMahon and Bob Newhart performed. He received an honorary Doctor of Communication Arts in 1988.

"I owe so much to CU," McMahon once said. "That's where my career got its start." Today, the Ed McMahon Endowed Scholarship helps outstanding students and provides scholarship assistance to juniors and seniors who are pursuing a bachelor's degree in either the Department of Drama or the Department of Media Studies within the School of Arts and Sciences.

== Entertainment career ==
=== Who Do You Trust? ===
McMahon and Carson first worked together as announcer and host on the ABC daytime game show Who Do You Trust? running from 1957 to 1962. He described the pair's first meeting as being "about as exciting as watching a traffic light change".

=== The Tonight Show Starring Johnny Carson ===
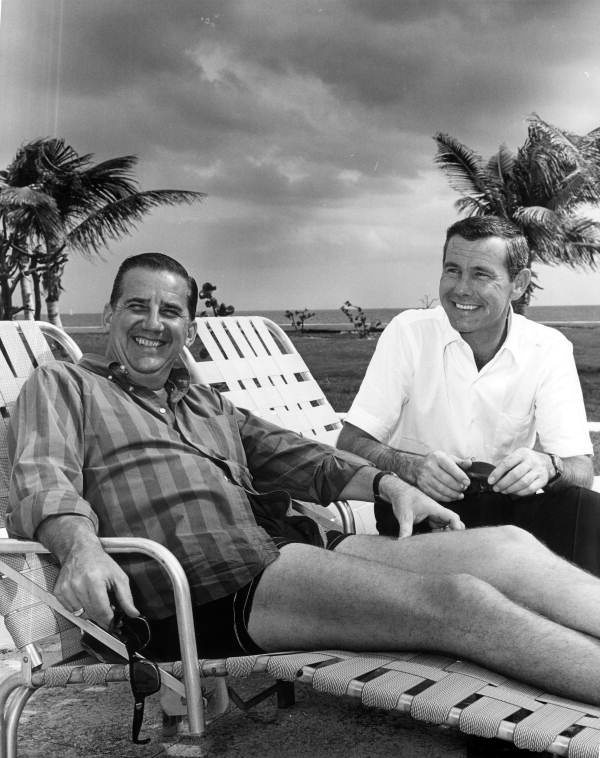
McMahon with Johnny Carson in the late 1960s

McMahon rejoined Carson for The Tonight Show Starring Johnny Carson on October 1, 1962, on NBC. For almost 30 years, McMahon introduced the show with a drawn-out "Heeeeeeeeeeere's Johnny!" His booming voice and constant laughter alongside the "King of Late Night" earned McMahon the nickname the "Human Laugh Track" and "Toymaker to the King." As part of the introductory patter to The Tonight Show, McMahon would state his name out loud, pronouncing it as /mɪkˈmeɪ.ən/, but neither long-time cohort Carson nor anyone else who interviewed him ever seemed to pick up on that subtlety, usually pronouncing his name /mɪkˈmæn/.

Aside from his co-hosting duties, it also fell upon McMahon during the early years of Carson's tenure (when the show ran 105 minutes) to host the first fifteen minutes of Tonight, which did not air nationally. McMahon also served as guest host on at least one occasion, substituting for Carson during a week of programs that aired between July 29 and August 2, 1963, and again for two nights in October 1963. The gregarious McMahon served as a counter to the notoriously shy Carson. Nonetheless, McMahon once told an interviewer that after his many decades as an emcee, he would still get "butterflies" in his stomach every time he would walk onto a stage and would use that nervousness as a source of energy.

His famous opening line "Heeere's Johnny!" was used in the 1980 horror film The Shining by the character Jack Torrance (played by Jack Nicholson) as he goes after his wife and child with an axe. McMahon did in-program commercials for many sponsors of The Tonight Show, most notably Budweiser beer and Alpo dog food, and also did commercials for them that ran on other programs. From 1970 to 1980, he appeared in American Family Publishers commercials.

=== Star Search ===
McMahon was also host of the successful weekly syndicated series Star Search, which began in 1983 and helped launch the careers of numerous actors, singers, choreographers and comedians. He stayed with the show until it ended in 1995 and in 2003, he made a cameo appearance on the CBS revival of the series, hosted by his successor Arsenio Hall.

=== Other roles ===
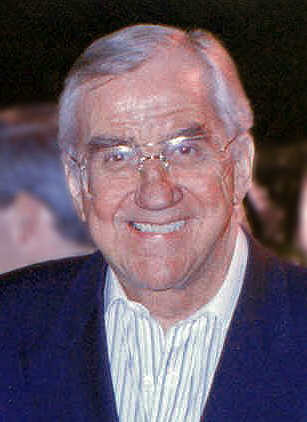
McMahon at the premiere of Air America in 1990

His long association with brewer Anheuser-Busch earned him the nickname "Mr. Budweiser" and he used that relationship to bring them aboard as one of the largest corporate donors to the Muscular Dystrophy Association. Beginning in 1973, McMahon served as co-host of the long-running live annual Labor Day weekend event of the Jerry Lewis MDA Telethon. His 41st and final appearance on that show was in 2008, making him second only to Jerry Lewis himself in number. McMahon and Dick Clark hosted the television series (and later special broadcasts of) TV's Bloopers and Practical Jokes on NBC from 1982 to 1993.

In 1967, McMahon had a role in the film The Incident and appeared as Santa Claus on The Mitzi Gaynor Christmas Show. From 1965 to 1969, McMahon served as "communicator" (host) of the Saturday afternoon segment of Monitor, the weekend news, features and entertainment magazine on the NBC Radio Network. The 1955 movie Dementia, which has music without dialogue, was released as Daughter of Horror in 1970. The newer version, which had a voice over by McMahon, still has music without dialogue, but with an added narration read by him. McMahon had a supporting role in the original Fun with Dick and Jane in 1977.

He then played himself in "Remote Control Man", a season one episode of Steven Spielberg's Amazing Stories. In 2004, McMahon became the announcer and co-host of Alf's Hit Talk Show on TV Land. He authored two memoirs, Here's Johnny!: My Memories of Johnny Carson, The Tonight Show, and 46 Years of Friendship as well as For Laughing Out Loud. Over the years, he emceed the game shows Missing Links, Snap Judgment, Concentration, and Whodunnit!.

McMahon also hosted Lifestyles Live, a weekend talk program aired on the USA Radio Network. Additionally, he also appeared in the feature documentary film, Pitch People, the first motion picture to take an in-depth look at the history and evolution of pitching products to the public. In the early 2000s, McMahon made a series of Neighborhood Watch public service announcements parodying the surprise appearances to contest winners that he was supposedly known for.

McMahon was originally hired to appear in Happy Gilmore and do the infamous fight scene with Adam Sandler, but according to Sandler, McMahon changed his mind after finding out about the movie's crude humor and so McMahon was replaced by Bob Barker.

Towards the end of the decade, McMahon took on other endorsement roles, playing a rapper for a FreeCreditReport.com commercial and in a Cash4Gold commercial alongside MC Hammer. McMahon was also the spokesman for Pride Mobility, a leading power wheelchair and scooter manufacturer. His final film appearance was in the independent John Hughes themed rom-com Jelly as Mr. Closure alongside actress Natasha Lyonne. Mostly in the 1980s through the 1990s, McMahon was the spokesperson for Colonial Penn Life Insurance Company, was also the spokesperson for American Family Publishers.

== Personal life ==
=== Marriage and children ===
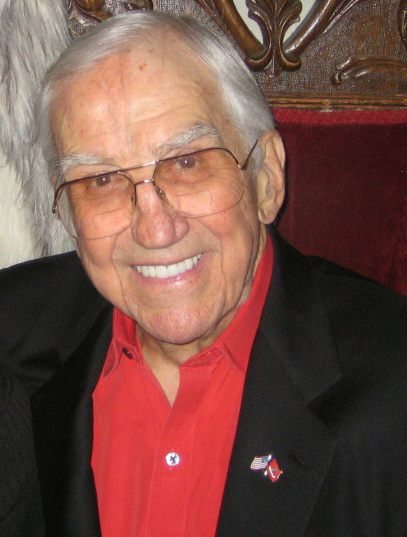
McMahon in 2005

McMahon married Alyce Ferrell on July 5, 1945, while he was serving as a flight instructor in the Marines. The couple had four children: Claudia (b. 1946), Michael Edward (1951–1995), Linda, and Jeffrey. They separated in 1972 and divorced in 1974. McMahon married Victoria Valentine on March 6, 1976. They adopted their daughter Katherine Mary in 1985. The couple divorced in 1989. McMahon paid $50,000 per month in spousal and child support. On February 22, 1992, three months before his Tonight Show run came to a close, in a ceremony held near Las Vegas, McMahon married 37-year-old Pamela "Pam" Hurn, who had a son named Alex. McMahon's daughter Katherine served as best person at the wedding. McMahon was a longtime summer resident of Avalon, New Jersey.

=== Financial problems ===
In June 2008, it was announced that McMahon was $644,000 behind on payments on $4.8 million in mortgage loans and was fighting to avoid foreclosure on his multimillion-dollar Beverly Hills home. McMahon was also sued by Citibank for $180,000. McMahon appeared on Larry King Live on June 5, 2008, with his wife to talk about this situation. In the interview, McMahon's wife Pam said that people assumed that the McMahons had a lot of money because of his celebrity status. Pamela McMahon also commented that they do not have "millions" of dollars. On July 30, 2008, McMahon's financial status suffered another blow. McMahon failed to pay divorce attorney Norman Solovay $275,168, according to a lawsuit filed in the Manhattan federal court. McMahon and his wife, Pamela, had hired Solovay to represent Linda Schmerge, his daughter from his first marriage, in a "matrimonial matter", said Solovay's lawyer, Michael Shanker.

On August 14, 2008, real estate mogul Donald Trump announced that he would purchase McMahon's home from Countrywide Financial and lease it to McMahon, so the home would not be foreclosed. McMahon agreed instead to a deal with a private buyer for his hilltop home, said Howard Bragman, McMahon's former spokesman. Bragman declined to name the buyer or the selling price, but he said it was not Trump. In early September, after the second buyer's offer fell through, Trump renewed his offer to purchase the home. Trump never followed through with either of his public offers to purchase the residence, per McMahon's daughter Claudia McMahon.

=== Health problems ===
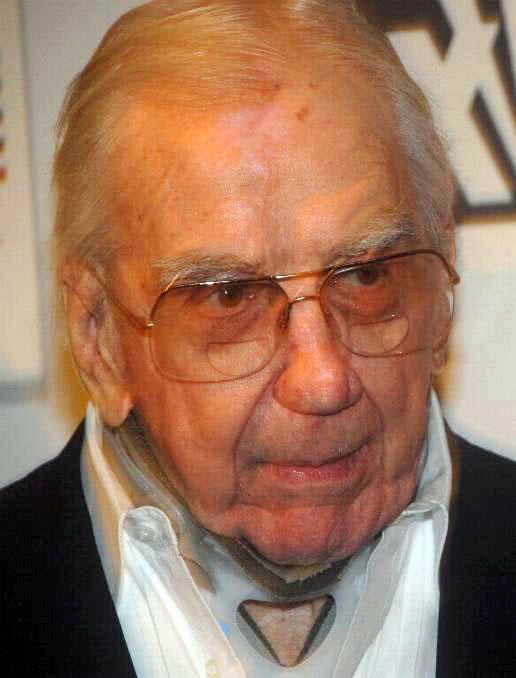
McMahon in 2008

On April 20, 2002, McMahon sued his insurance company for more than $20 million, alleging that he was sickened by toxic mold that spread through his Beverly Hills house after contractors failed to properly clean up water damage from a broken pipe. McMahon and his wife, Pamela, became ill from the mold, as did members of their household staff, according to the Los Angeles County Superior Court suit. The McMahons blamed the mold for the death of the family dog, Muffin. Their suit, one of many in recent years over toxic mold, was filed against American Equity Insurance Co., a pair of insurance adjusters, and several environmental cleanup contractors. It sought monetary damages for alleged breach of contract, negligence, and intentional infliction of emotional distress.

On March 21, 2003, the long legal battle ended with McMahon being awarded $7.2 million from several companies who were negligent for allowing toxic mold into his home, sickening him and his wife and killing their dog. In March 2007, McMahon was injured in a fall and, in March 2008, it was announced he was recovering from a broken neck and two subsequent surgeries. He later sued Cedars-Sinai Medical Center and two doctors claiming fraud, battery, elder abuse, and emotional distress, and accused them of discharging him with a broken neck after his fall and botching two later neck surgeries.

On February 27, 2009, it was reported that McMahon had been in an undisclosed Los Angeles hospital (later confirmed as Ronald Reagan UCLA Medical Center) for almost a month. He was listed in serious condition and was in the intensive care unit. His publicist told reporters that he was admitted for pneumonia at the time, but could not confirm nor deny reports that McMahon had been diagnosed with bone cancer.

== Death ==
McMahon died on June 23, 2009, shortly after midnight at Ronald Reagan UCLA Medical Center in Los Angeles, California. He was 86 years old. His nurse, Julie Koehne, stated he went peacefully. No formal cause of death was given, but McMahon's publicist attributed his death to the many health problems he had suffered over his final months. McMahon had said that he still suffered from his neck injury the past two years. His funeral was held at Forest Lawn Memorial Park in Hollywood Hills.

== Tributes and legacy ==
The night of McMahon's death, Conan O'Brien paid tribute to him on The Tonight Show:

It is impossible, I think, for anyone to imagine The Tonight Show with Johnny Carson without Ed McMahon. Ed's laugh was really the soundtrack to that show. He created the most iconic two-shot in broadcasting history. There will never be anything like that again.

He received a star on the Hollywood Walk of Fame for Television on March 20, 1986.

The Broadcast Pioneers of Philadelphia posthumously inducted McMahon into their Hall of Fame in 2010.

== Books ==
- Ed McMahon's Barside Companion. World Publishing Company. 1969. ISBN 0671772155. LCCN 70-94527.
- Slimming down (in German). New York: Grosset & Dunlap. 1972. ISBN 0-448-01550-1. OCLC 508303.
- Here's Ed: The Autobiography of Ed McMahon, with Carroll Carroll (Putnam, 1976) ISBN 0399116915
- Ed McMahon's Superselling, by Ed McMahon with Warren Jamison (Prentice Hall Press, 1989), ISBN 0-13-943366-X
- For Laughing Out Loud: My Life and Good Times (Warner Books, 1998), co-written with David Fisher ISBN 0446523704
- Here's Johnny! My Memories of Johnny Carson, The Tonight Show, and 46 Years of Friendship (Berkley Publishing Group – Penguin Group, 2005) ISBN 0425212297
- Backstage at the Tonight Show, by Don Sweeney, foreword by Ed McMahon (Taylor Trade Publishing), 2006 ISBN 978-1589793033
- When Television Was Young: The Inside Story with Memories by Legends of the Small Screen, with David Fisher (Thomas Nelson, 2007) ISBN 1401603270

Media offices
Preceded by Hugh Downs	The Tonight Show announcer 1962–1992	Succeeded by Edd Hall
