= Infomercial =

Long television commercial

An infomercial is a form of television advertisement that resembles regular TV programming yet is intended to promote or sell a product, service or idea. It generally includes a toll-free telephone number or website. Most often used as a form of direct response television (DRTV), they are often program‑length commercials (long-form infomercials), and are typically 28:30 or 58:30 minutes in length. Infomercials are also known as "paid programming" (or "teleshopping" in Europe). This phenomenon started in the United States, where infomercials were typically shown overnight and early morning (usually 1:00 a.m. to 9:00 a.m.), outside peak prime time for commercial broadcasters. Some television stations chose to air infomercials as an alternative to the former practice of signing off, while other channels air infomercials 24 hours a day. Some stations also choose to air infomercials during the daytime, mostly on weekends, to fill in for unscheduled network or syndicated programming. By 2009, most infomercial spending in the United States occurred outside the traditional overnight. Stations in most countries around the world have instituted similar media structures. The infomercial industry is worth over $200 billion.

Washington, D.C.–based National Infomercial Marketing Association was formed in late 1990; by 1993, "it had more than 200" members committed to standards "with teeth".

While the term "infomercial" was originally applied only to television advertising, it is now sometimes used to refer to any presentation (often on video) which presents a significant amount of information in an actual, or perceived, attempt to promote a point of view. When used this way, the term may be meant to carry an implication that the party making the communication or political speech is exaggerating truths or hiding important facts.

The New York Times cited a professional in the field as saying that "infomercial companies tend to do well during recessions."

== Format ==
The word "infomercial" is a portmanteau of the words "information" and "commercial". As in any other form of advertisement, the content is a commercial message designed to represent the viewpoints and to serve the interest of the sponsor. Infomercials are often made to closely resemble standard television programs. Some imitate talk shows and try to downplay the fact that the program is a commercial message. A few are developed around storylines and have been called "storymercials". However, most do not have specific TV formats but craft different elements to tell what their creators hope is a compelling story about the product offered.

The term infomercial, by 2007, had come to refer to the format, even when used in a live presentation.

Infomercials are designed to solicit quantifiable immediate direct response (a form of direct response marketing, not to be confused with direct marketing); they generally feature between two and four internal commercials of 30 to 120 seconds which invite the viewer to call or take other direct action. Many viewers respond with a delayed response, by purchases made at retail outlets. These retail purchases are often the largest response. Using "not sold in stores" is a choice by advertisers who dislike sharing profit with retailers, or who lack the immense resources needed to get into retail channels. In the latter case, direct sales enables later retail distribution. Standalone shorter commercials, 30 to 120 seconds in length with a call to action, are erroneously called infomercials; when used as an independently produced commercial, they are generally known as DRTV spots or short‑form DRTV. Infomercial sponsors often also use shorter spots during regular programming.

=== Products using infomercial marketing ===
The products frequently marketed through infomercials at the national level include cleaning products, appliances, food-preparation devices, dietary supplements, alternative health aids, memory improvement courses, books, compilation albums, videos of numerous genres, real estate investment strategies, beauty supplies, baldness remedies, sexual-enhancement supplements, weight-loss programs and products, personal fitness devices, home exercise machines and adult chat lines.

Uses for infomercials in the early 1990s included offering free trials of personal care products such as enhanced plaque removers; an 800-number was used to collect basic marketing information.

Major brands (such as Apple, Microsoft and Thermos-Grill2Go) have used infomercials for their ability to communicate more complicated and in‑depth product stories. This practice started in the early 1990s and has increased since. Such advertisers generally eschew the less reputable trappings of the traditional infomercial business in order to create communication they believe creates a better image of their products, brands and customers. Apple's use of the infomercial medium was immediately discontinued with Steve Jobs' 1997 return to the helm of the company.

Automobile dealerships, attorneys and jewelers are among the types of businesses that air infomercials on a local level.

== History ==
=== Early infomercials ===
During the early days of television, many television shows were specifically created by sponsors with the main goal of selling their product, the entertainment angle being a hook to hold audience's attention (this is how soap operas got their name; such shows were sponsored by soap manufacturers). A good example of this is the early children's show The Magic Clown on NBC, which was created essentially as an advertisement for Bonomo's Turkish Taffy.

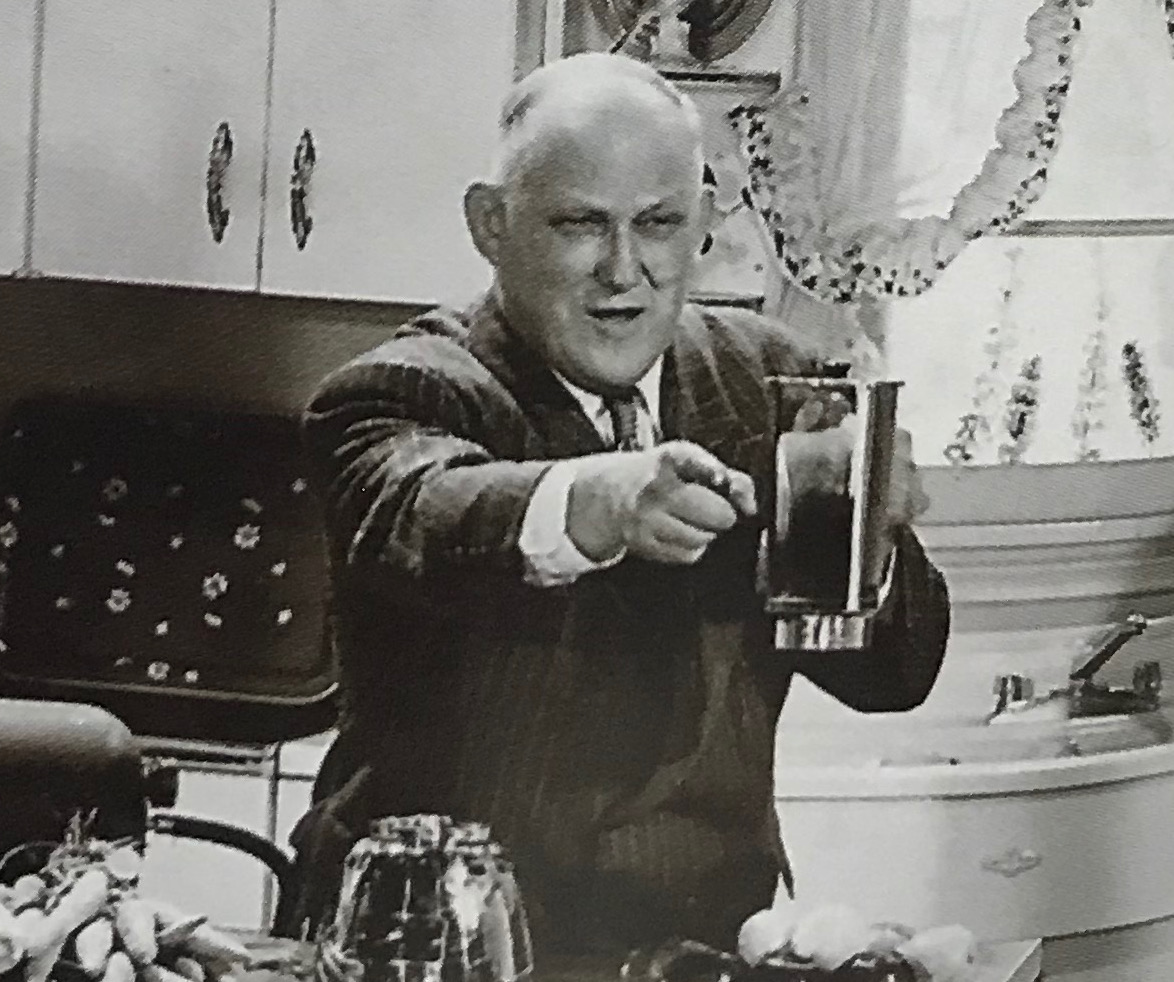
W. G. (Papa) Bernard was the pitchman in the first filmed half-hour TV infomercial. Image courtesy of the Hagley Museum and Library.

The first filmed for TV half-hour infomercial for a commercial product (a Vitamix blender) were directed by Ray Culley and produced by Cinécraft Productions, a motion picture studio in Ohio in 1949. (Note: A number of the early Vitamix infomercials produced by Cinécraft are posted on the Hagley Museum and Library digital archive.) WOR-TV ran the infomercial from 12:30 to 1 a.m. on a Sunday. By 1:10 a.m., 130 orders had rolled in. Eleven subsequent showings of the infomercial brought in more than $41,400 in 1950 dollars.

One of the earliest pitch men in infomercials was Ron Popeil. He first appeared on television in 1956, demonstrating the "Chop-O-Matic," a device invented by his father. He later pitched products he invented himself and was nicknamed "America's Salesman." He is also credited with introducing the phrase, "but wait, there's more," a popular slogan used with infomercials starting in the 1950s.

Eventually, limits imposed by the Federal Communications Commission (FCC) on the amount of advertising that could appear during an hour of television did away with these programs, forcing sponsors into the background; however, a few infomercials, mainly those for greatest hits record sets (which could get around the restrictions by devoting much of the airtime to snippets of the songs on the records, which did not count as advertising) and Shop Smith power tools, did exist during the period when commercial time was restricted.

In 1976, a singer who found success with an infomercial under these restrictions was Peter Lemongello, whose album Love '76 sold over 1.8 million copies as a result of its frequent advertising via a two-minute infomercial on New York television stations, which made him a local celebrity, leading him to expand his campaign into the Los Angeles and Las Vegas markets.

During the 1970s, XETV-TDT – a Mexican TV station based in Tijuana, but serving the San Diego market – ran a one-hour English-language program on Sundays showcasing San Diego–area homes for sale. As a non-USA station, the FCC's maximum number of commercial minutes per hour did not apply to XETV. It was also during the 1970s that the hard sell "But wait! There's more!" Ginsu ads were being aired on American late-night TV.

=== After 1984 ===
The Federal Communications Commission lifted the prohibition on program-length advertisements on radio in 1981. Television followed in 1984 when the United States' Federal Communications Commission eliminated regulations that were established in the 1950s and 1960s to govern the commercial content of television. One such regulation was dropping the limits on the length of television commercials.

One of the pioneers of the modern infomercial industry was Ray Lindstrom, who produced one of the first nationally broadcast infomercials, Get Rich with Real Estate (first aired on Satellite Program Network and The Nashville Network in October 1984) as a way to promote real estate professional Paul Simon. In 1985, he and partner Nancy Marcum purchased 2,700 hours of cable time at a cost of $8 million which translated to $21 million in sales by end of that year. The pair formed Media Arts International and continued to release infomercials on various products. They sold the company in 1986 but Lindstrom continued to make over 100 infomercials through his career. He later became known as "Mr. Infomercial" and the "father of the infomercial industry."

Kevin Harrington had his first infomercial air in 1985. Two early half-hour paid programs, Keys to Success (first aired on WPEC on June 1, 1985) and Can You Be Thinner? (first aired on KDNL-TV on July 21) both received frequent airplay nationwide into 1989. Harrington was one of the first to utilize dead slots during the late-night or early-morning to run infomercials and was nicknamed the "infomercial godfather"

By 1994, an estimated 91% of all stations had or were airing infomercials.

==== Product or person as pitchman ====
One relatively early question was whether or not infomercials should feature celebrities. Although "how much will it cost" was part of the equation, so was a "highly demonstrable item with obvious features and benefits." Even when experts are used for their endorsement value, a "name" adds value in making an introduction. (Note: "Montel Williams's infomercials, pitching products like a blanket with arms, resemble his show.")

Infomercials particularly exploded in the mid-1990s with motivational and personal development products, and "get-rich-quick schemes" based on the premise that one could quickly become wealthy by either selling anything through classified ads or through flipping. These were hawked by personalities such as Don Lapre and Carleton H. Sheets, among others.

==== When and where ====
When they first appeared, infomercials were most often scheduled in the United States and Canada during the late night and early morning. As stations have found value in airing them at other times, a large portion of infomercial spending occurs in the early morning, daytime, early prime and even prime time periods. There are also all-infomercial networks (such as cable channels Corner Store TV, OnTV4U, Access Television Network and GRTV) that yield revenue for cable and satellite providers who carry them or fill local programming voids.

Some cable carriage contracts were adjusted in 2006. CNBC, which airs only two hours of infomercials nightly during the business week, sometimes airs nearly 30 hours of infomercials on weekends; from the 2008 financial crisis to early 2017, CNBC had inserted a "paid programming" bug at the top right corner of the screen during all airings of infomercials. In contrast, sister network CNBC World airs international programming rather than any paid programming.

When a conventional prime-time two-minute advertising pod has no ads, the networks will run a two-minute mini-infomercial at a much lower rate, charging "as little as 5 percent of what a general advertiser would" pay.

==== Commercials becoming full programs ====
The New York Times suggested that "the commercial became the show as infomercials ruled the night."

A comparison of television listings from 2007 with 1987 verifies that many North American broadcasters began to air infomercials in lieu of syndicated television series reruns and movies, which were formerly staples during the more common times infomercials are broadcast (such as the overnight). Infomercials were previously a near-permanent staple of Ion Television's daytime and overnight schedules, but the channel now only carries infomercials in the traditional 3:00–8:00 a.m. ET/PT timeslot emulated by most cable networks. Multichannel providers such as DirecTV had objected to carrying Ion feeds consisting largely of paid programming. This is despite both DirecTV and Dish carrying several infomercial-only and leased access networks which have been criticized by their subscribers.

=== United Kingdom ===
As with other advertising, content is supervised by the Advertising Standards Authority (ASA) and regulated by Ofcom. Advertising rules are written and maintained by the Committees of Advertising Practice (CAP), working closely with the ASA and Ofcom.

In the UK, "admags" (advertisement magazines) were originally a feature of the regional commercial ITV stations from launch in 1955. While very popular, admags were banned in 1963. The word "teleshopping" was coined in 1979 by Michael Aldrich, who invented real-time transaction processing from a domestic television and subsequently installed many systems throughout the UK in the 1980s. This would now be referred to as online shopping. In the 1989, the Satellite Shop was launched as the first UK shopping channel. Shortly afterwards, infomercials began on satellite television, and they became known as teleshopping. Until 2009, the UK permitted neither paid infomercials nor teleshopping on broadcast television. However, in 2009, Ofcom allowed up to three hours of infomercials per day on any channel.

Airtime for political messages, known as party political broadcasts, is allocated free of charge to political parties according to a formula approved by Parliament, and is available only on broadcast television and radio channels. The Communications Act 2003 prohibits political advertising. Television advertising of pharmacy-only and prescription drugs is also prohibited.

=== Televangelists ===
Some U.S. televangelists such as Robert Tilton and Peter Popoff buy television time from infomercial brokers representing television stations around the U.S., and even some widely distributed cable networks that are not averse to carrying religious programming. A block of such programming appears weekdays on BET under the umbrella title BET Inspiration (which fully replaced the direct-response variety of infomercials on the channel in 1997). The vast majority of religious programming in the United States is distributed through paid infomercial time; the fees that televangelists pay for coverage on most religious stations are a major revenue stream for those stations, in addition to programming the networks produce themselves.

=== TiVo ===
TiVo formerly used paid programming time weekly on the Discovery Channel on early Thursday mornings and Ion Television on early Wednesday mornings to record interactive and video content to be presented to subscribers in a form of linear datacasting without the need to interfere with a subscriber's internet bandwidth (or lack thereof if they solely used the machine's dialup connection for updating). The program was listed as Teleworld Paid Program, named for TiVo's corporate name at its founding. Teleworld Paid Program was quietly discontinued at the start of the 2016–17 television season as the company's install base had mostly transitioned to broadband and newer TiVo devices no longer included a dialup option.

=== 2008 financial crisis ===
During the 2008 financial crisis, many struggling individual television stations began to devote more of their programming schedules to infomercials, thereby reducing syndication contracts for regular programming. Some stations found that the revenue from infomercial-time sales were higher than those possible through traditional television advertising and syndication sales options. However, the reduced ratings from airing infomercials can have a chain reaction and harm ratings for other programming on the station.

A feature-length documentary that chronicles the early history of specific types of infomercials is Pitch People. It was filmed in the late 1990s. </ref>https://www.imdb.com/title/tt0241822/?ref_=fn_t_1

In 2008, Tribune Content Agency and Gemstar-TV Guide/Rovi began to relax the guidelines for listing infomercials within their electronic program guide listings. Previously, all infomercials were listed under the title "Paid Programming" (except for exceptions listed below), but now infomercial producers are allowed to submit a title and limited descriptive synopsis (though phone numbers or website addresses remain disallowed) to the listings providers.

=== Fox's Saturday morning programming ===
In January 2009, Fox became the first major broadcast network to carry a regularly scheduled block of paid programming when it discontinued its Saturday morning children's programming, 4Kids TV, after disputes with provider 4Kids Entertainment. Fox gave three early hours to its affiliates, while retaining two hours for infomercials under the title Weekend Marketplace.

Some local stations utilize Saturday morning slots to air local paid programming that typically sells used cars or real estate, (Note: "Fox News .. said .. had set aside inventory for 'make-goods' which it did not need to fulfill, and was turning to some direct-response advertisers") and in other ways rejected infomercials, which were disdained by viewers and Fox affiliates alike: revenue was not shared with affiliates, and no local time for commercials between programs was offered. Some stations used Saturday morning for Educational/Informational (E/I) programming, with infomercials relegated to before or after the block. Some refused Weekend Marketplace outright.

In September 2014, Weekend Marketplace was replaced in some markets by the E/I‑focused Xploration Station.

== Criticism and legal issues ==
In the United States, the Federal Trade Commission (FTC) requires that any infomercial 15 minutes or longer must disclose to viewers that it is a paid advertisement. An infomercial is required to be "clearly and conspicuously" marked as a "paid advertisement for [particular product or service], sponsored by [sponsor]" at the beginning ("following program") and end ("preceding program") of the advertisement and before ordering instructions are displayed.

Customer protection advocates recommend buyer beware: study the product and the claims before making a purchase. Many stations and networks normally run their own disclaimers before, during and/or after infomercials. Some mention the Better Business Bureau or a state/local customer protection agency. A "paid programming" bug in a corner of the screen during infomercials, particularly for financial products, is to avoid an exploitation of an "as seen on" claim of endorsement. Some, particularly smaller networks, only use a limited number of trusted advertisers.

Considerable FTC scrutiny is also given to results claims and testimonials. Rules controlling endorsements are periodically enhanced to increase customer protection and fill loopholes. Industry organizations such as the Electronic Retailing Association, which represents infomercial marketers, often try to minimize the impact of these rule changes. FTC enforcement has focused on testimonials for publishing "non-typical" and "completely fabricated" customer testimonials used within infomercials. In 2006, the first third-party testimonial verification company was launched, and it now independently pre-validates many testimonials.

Since the 1990s, federal and state customer protection agencies have criticized several prominent infomercial pitchmen, including Kevin Trudeau, Donald Barrett and, to a lesser extent, Matthew Lesko, and also Don Lapre, a salesman notorious for his get-rich-quick schemes. Some were successfully sued.

Programs that collect donations or sell via Premium-rate telephone number (900-number) have additional disclosure requirements.

== Parodies ==
The infomercial format has been widely parodied:

- Saturday Night Live's "Bassomatic" skit featuring Dan Aykroyd in the 1970s may have presaged the genre; the target of the parody, Ron Popeil, would become an infomercial fixture in the 1980s and 1990s.
- Fast Company published "The Greatest Infomercial Parodies Of All Time" in 2011.

Others have been done too, and these parodies are an ongoing source of amusement and creativity.

The Adult Swim late-night block of cable channel Cartoon Network has often broadcast an anthology of comedy shorts in the early morning, concealed in program schedules under the title "Infomercials" to provide a false impression that legitimate paid programming had been scheduled in that time slot. Some of these shorts have parodied the cliches of real infomercials, such as Paid Programming (a parody infomercial which begins as one for the fictitious supplement Icelandic UltraBlue, but seamlessly segues into segments promoting other loosely related products and businesses), For-Profit Online University, and Live Forever as You Are Now with Alan Resnick (which parodies self-help programs).

== Other uses and definitions ==
=== Political infomercials ===
In the United States, the strategy of buying prime-time programming slots on major networks has been utilized by political candidates for both presidential and state office to present infomercial-like programs to sell a candidate's merits to the public. Fringe presidential candidate Lyndon LaRouche regularly bought time on CBS and local stations in the 1980s. In the 1990s, Ross Perot also bought network time in 1992 and 1996 to present, his presidential policies to the public. The National Rifle Association (NRA) has aired programs via paid programming time to present their views on issues such as gun control and other issues while appealing to the public to join their organization.

=== Use during the 2008 presidential campaign ===
Hillary Clinton bought an hour of primetime programming on the Hallmark Channel in 2008 before the Super Tuesday primary elections, and on Texas‑based regional sports network FSN Southwest before that state's primary to present a town hall–like program. Fellow presidential candidate Barack Obama's 2008 presidential campaign used infomercials extensively, including running a 24-hour channel on Dish Network.

One week before the 2008 presidential election, Obama purchased a 30-minute slot at 8 p.m. Eastern and Pacific Time during primetime on seven major networks (NBC, CBS, MSNBC, Fox, BET, TV One and Univision [with Spanish subtitles]) to present a "closing argument" to his campaign. The combination of these networks reportedly drew a peak audience of over 33 million viewers of the half-hour program, making it the single most watched infomercial broadcast in the history of U.S. television.

Aside from blocking viewer choice, reception was not all positive: an NBC reviewer referred to Obama as having a "thin resume". Obama opponent John McCain commented that "No one will delay the World Series with an infomercial when I'm president."

=== Children's programming ===
Although not meeting the definition of an infomercial per se, animated children's programming in the 1980s and early 1990s, which included half-hour animated series for franchises such as He-Man and the Masters of the Universe, My Little Pony, and Transformers, were often described as being marketing vehicles for related toy lines and tie-in products advertised during commercial breaks. In the United States, the Children's Television Act of 1990 set limits on the amount of commercials that could be aired during a television programming targeting children, and made it a violation of FCC regulations for broadcasters to carry commercials during children's programs for products related to the program currently airing (which classifies the entire program as being a "program-length commercial"), or containing recognizable elements, such as characters, from the current program ("host‑selling").

=== Daytime programming ===
From the 1970s to early 1990s, locally produced morning and daytime programs designed mainly for a stay-at-home female audience featured light talk, followed by presentations of various products and services offerings of local businesses. A guest expert was often included. These were not infomercials: response was in-store, although the expert's phone number might be included. The format enabled presenting details beyond those possible in a traditional 30-second pre-recorded ad. To preclude conflict of interest, the program host was not associated in any way with the station's newsroom.

By the mid-2000s, these transitioned from locally produced programs to what is known as an advertorial. Some programs had one or more 120-second pods, but these programs were all paid programming. These programs can be considered infomercials, albeit not exactly meeting the letter of the definition. As with the early model, advertorial hosts are precluded from newsroom involvement, often to the point of having no IFB notice to guide viewers to a breaking news story that interrupts an advertorial program.

== Infomercial companies ==
Traditional infomercial marketers (for example, Guthy-Renker, Beachbody, and Telebrands) source the products, pay to develop the infomercials, pay for the media, and are responsible for all sales of the product. Sometimes, they sell products they source from inventors. Telebrands's process of bringing a product to the air and to market was seen in the 2009 Discovery Channel series PitchMen, which featured Billy Mays and Anthony Sullivan, along with the top executives of Telebrands.

There is also a well-developed network of suppliers to the infomercial industry. These suppliers generally choose to focus on either traditional infomercials (hard sell approaches) or on using infomercials as advertising/sales channels for brand companies (branded approaches). In the traditional business, services are usually supplied by infomercial producers or by media buying companies. In the brand infomercial business, services are often provided by full service agencies who deliver strategy, creative, production, media, and campaign services.

== Use around the world ==
The infomercial industry was started in the United States and that has led to the specific definitions of infomercials as direct response television commercials of specific lengths (30, 60 or 120 seconds; five minutes; 28 1/2 minutes or 58 minutes and 30 seconds). Infomercials have spread to other countries from the U.S. However, the term "infomercial" needs to be defined more universally to discuss use in all countries. In general, worldwide use of the term refers to a television commercial (paid programming) that offers product for direct sale to persons via response through the web, by phone, or by mail.

There are few structures that apply everywhere in the international infomercial business. The regulatory environment in each country as well as that country's television traditions have led to variations in format, lengths, and rules for long form commercials and television commercials selling directly to customers. For example, in the early 1990s, long form paid programming in Canada was required to consist only of photographs without moving video (this restriction no longer exists).

Many products which started in the United States have been taken into international distribution on television. In addition, each country has local entrepreneurs and marketers using the medium for local businesses. What may be called infomercials are most commonly found in North and South America, Europe, Japan and Southeast Asia.

In many countries, the infrastructure of direct response television distributors, telemarketing companies and product fulfillment companies (shipping, customer service) are more difficult and these missing pieces have limited the spread of the infomercial. Canadian Northern Response, an early non‑USA entrant to the field, claims to have distributed "over 3,000 infomercials since 1984."

By 1996, countries with Teleshopping included France, Germany, UK, Japan, and Mexico.

== Research on effectiveness ==
Research has been conducted on the general public's perceptions of infomercials. It was found that "With infomercials, you don't buy eyeballs, you buy responsiveness." Agee and Martin (2001) found that infomercial purchases involved some degree of planning rather than being purely impulse purchases. Aspects of advertising content also influenced whether the purchase decision was impulsive or planned. Martin, Bhimy and Agee (2002) studied the use of advertising content such as the use of testimonials and customer characteristics. Based on a survey of 878 people who had bought products after viewing infomercials, they found that infomercials were more effective if they used expert comments, testimonials, product demonstrations, and other approaches. Customer age and product type also influenced perceived effectiveness.

=== Time-slot effectiveness ===
Early research found that selecting the best time of day requires avoiding prime time, when "there's too much competition for viewers' attention."

=== Profitability ===
Profits from producing infomercials were described as not being "the real profits" when compared to "owning the product."

== See also ==
- Advertorial
- Brokered programming
- Direct response television
- Shopping channel
- Home shopping
- Informative advertising
- Product demonstration
- Psychological pricing
- Sponsored film
- Television advertisement
- Telethon
