= Brand-new =

Marketing strategy

In marketing, brand-new products or services are created and promoted under a new brand. This is a brand strategy alongside the brand stretching, line extension and multi-brands strategies. The brand-new strategy is focused on creating and introducing new products effectively. It involves researching a market to discover consumer needs that provide a market opportunity, generating ideas on how to approach that opportunity, and commercializing a product by communicating how the product covers the needs.

Companies may introduce brand-new products that replace products, as a leading function for marketing, instead of making incremental improvements on existing products.

== See also ==
- As seen on TV
