= Billy Mays =

American salesperson (1958–2009)

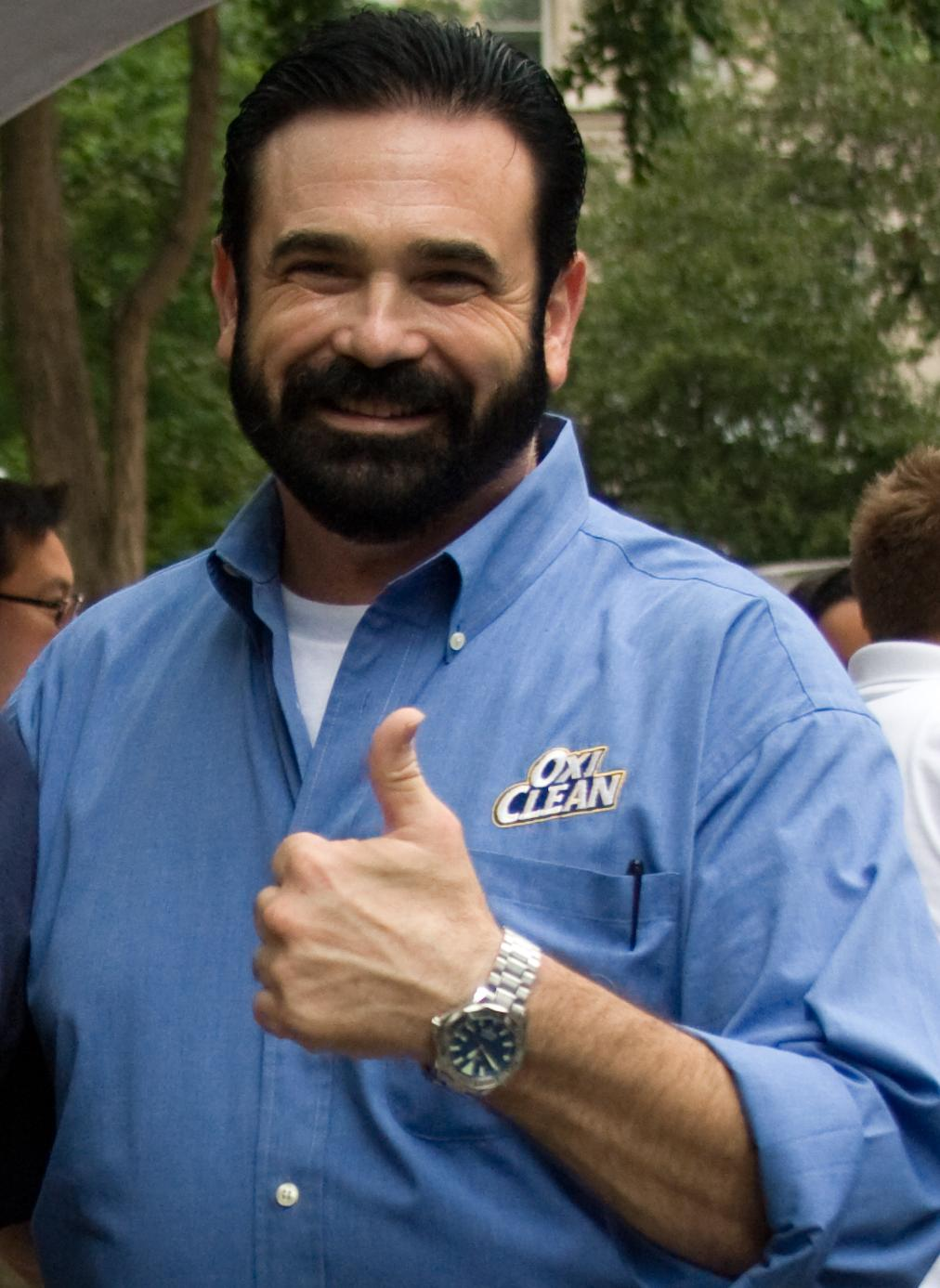
- Mays in early June 2009
- Born: William Darrell Mays Jr. July 20, 1958; McKees Rocks, Pennsylvania, U.S.
- Died: June 28, 2009 (aged 50); Tampa, Florida, U.S.
- Resting place: Mount Calvary Cemetery, McKees Rocks, Pennsylvania, U.S.
- Other name: King of the Pitch
- Occupation: Television direct-response advertisement salesman
- Years active: 1983–2009
- Employer: Home Shopping Network
- Known for: Infomercial acting
- Television: PitchMen
- Board member of: Mays Promotions, Inc.
- Spouses: Dolores DiDesiderio (div. 1990); Deborah Mays (m. 2002)
- Children: 2

William Darrell Mays Jr. (July 20, 1958 – June 28, 2009) was an American television direct-response advertisement salesperson. Throughout his career, he promoted a wide variety of products, including OxiClean, Orange Glo, Kaboom, Zorbeez, and Mighty Mendit. His promotions aired mainly on the Home Shopping Network through his company, Mays Promotions, Inc., although they have aired on other syndicated networks. Mays's infomercials were known for his catch phrase "Hi, Billy Mays here", and his shouted delivery of lines.

Mays and his business partner, Anthony Sullivan, were also featured on PitchMen, a Discovery Channel television series that documented their work. His distinctive beard, attire, loud voice, and impassioned sales pitches made him a recognized television presence in the United States and Canada.

== Early life ==
Mays was born on July 20, 1958, in McKees Rocks, Pennsylvania, to Joyce Palm and Billy Mays Sr, where he was raised in nearby Pittsburgh. He was a student at Sto-Rox High School, and later West Virginia University, where he was a walk-on linebacker on its football team during his two years there.

== Career ==
=== Early work ===
After dropping out of college, Mays worked for his father's hazardous waste company before moving to Atlantic City, New Jersey, in 1983. On the Atlantic City boardwalk, Mays sold the Washmatik portable washing device to passersby, along with other "As Seen on TV" products. In Atlantic City, he said, "I was taught to pitch by a lot of old pitchmen. That's the kind of style I have."

Mays then traveled to home shows, auto shows, and state fairs across the United States for a period of twelve years, selling various maintenance products and tools, including cleaning products and food choppers.

=== Television pitching ===
At a Pittsburgh, Pennsylvania, home show in 1993, Mays struck up a friendship with rival salesman Max Appel, founder of Orange Glo International, a Denver-based manufacturer of cleaning products. He was then hired by the company to promote their line of cleaners, OxiClean, Orange Clean, Orange Glo, and Kaboom, on the Home Shopping Network in St. Petersburg, Florida. That same year he also befriended another future pitchman, Anthony Sullivan. Customer response to Mays's sales pitches was enthusiastic, and sales sharply increased after his first day, although some reviews were poor. He was very well known for shouting during infomercials. For example, The Washington Post staff writer Frank Ahrens called him and other similar television salesmen "a full-volume pitchman, amped up like a candidate for a tranquilizer-gun takedown".

In October 2000, Mays shot an infomercial for the then-three-year-old OxiClean corporation. He became a staple of the brand and the wider company, Orange Glo. Later on he appeared in Kaboom infomercials.

Mays was the CEO and founder of Mays Promotions, Inc., based at his home in Odessa, Florida. His services as a pitchman became highly sought-after, and he appeared in commercials for many diverse "As Seen On TV" products such as Mighty Putty. Mays claimed to be an avid user of the products he promoted.

In December 2008, Mays began appearing in ads for ESPN's online service, ESPN360. These ads were a slight departure for Mays as they were designed to be parodies of his and other infomercial clichés. He also made a live appearance during the 2008 Champs Sports Bowl promoting ESPN's and ABC's January 1, 2009, bowl games. Prior to his death, Mays had signed a deal with Taco Bell to film infomercial-style commercials for the chain. Shooting was scheduled to begin in August 2009.

On March 26, 2009, Mays appeared on The Tonight Show with Jay Leno.

On April 15, 2009, the Discovery Channel began airing PitchMen, a documentary series that featured Mays and Anthony Sullivan in their jobs in direct-response marketing. After Mays's death, Discovery Channel aired a special Billy Mays tribute special, Pitchman: A Tribute to Billy Mays.

He and Sullivan also appeared on The Tonight Show with Conan O'Brien on June 23, 2009, five days before his death.

== Personal life ==
Mays's first marriage was to Dolores "Dee Dee" Mays, which ended in divorce. He had a son with Dolores named Billy Mays III (born August 12, 1986) who worked as a production assistant alongside his father on the PitchMen television show. Mays had a daughter, Elizabeth, with his second wife, Deborah Mays. His daughter was three years old at the time of his death.

In an interview during the 2008 presidential election, Mays said he was a Republican. He was also a Catholic.

== Death ==
Mays was found unresponsive by his wife in his Tampa, Florida, home on the morning of June 28, 2009. He was pronounced dead at 7:45 a.m., aged 50, appearing to have died sometime overnight. The Associated Press reported that there were no indications that the house had been burglarized and that police did not suspect foul play. Mays had told his wife the previous evening that he had felt unwell, and initially there was incorrect speculation that he died from a head injury he experienced on a flight he had taken earlier in the day, in which the plane sustained a rough landing after blowing its tires.

After an initial autopsy on June 29, 2009, Vernard Adams, the Hillsborough County, Florida, medical examiner, stated that Mays suffered from hypertensive heart disease and that heart disease was the likely cause of his death. According to a toxicology report released August 7, 2009, heart disease was the "primary cause of death" and cocaine was listed as a "contributory cause of death". In response to the release of the toxicology report, the Mays family issued a press release stating, "We are extremely disappointed by the press release released by the Hillsborough County medical examiner's office. We believe it contains speculative conclusions that are frankly unnecessary and tend to obscure the conclusion that Billy suffered from chronic, untreated hypertension." They also stated that they were considering "an independent evaluation of the autopsy results".

The medical examiner concluded that "cocaine use caused or contributed to the development of his heart disease, and thereby contributed to his death," the office said in a press release. The office said Mays last used cocaine in the few days before his death but was not under the influence of the drug when he died. Hillsborough County spokeswoman Lori Hudson said that nothing in the toxicology report indicated the frequency of Mays's cocaine use. Cocaine can raise the arterial blood pressure, directly cause hypertrophy of the left ventricle, and accelerate the formation of atherosclerosis in the coronary arteries, the release said. However, in October 2009, the results of a second medical examination, commissioned by Mays's family, concluded that cocaine was not a "significant contributing factor" to his death.

According to subsequent news reports, the toxicology tests also showed levels of painkillers hydrocodone, oxycodone, and tramadol, as well as anti-anxiety drugs alprazolam and diazepam. Mays suffered from hip problems and was scheduled to have had hip replacement surgery on June 29, a day after he was found dead.

Mays's funeral was held on July 3, 2009, in his hometown of McKees Rocks, Pennsylvania. The pallbearers wore blue shirts and khaki pants at the funeral, much like Mays wore when he advertised his products. He is buried in Mount Calvary Cemetery.

In the immediate aftermath of his death, many companies pulled ads featuring Mays from the air. By mid-July, with his family's consent, some ads were put back into rotation, alongside newer ones that Mays had filmed prior to his death.

== In popular culture ==
His catchphrase and infomercials made Billy Mays a notable icon in popular culture, with many shows, YouTube videos, and films lampooning him. In the South Park episode "Dead Celebrities", Mays's ghost appears repeatedly to Ike Broflovski, trying to sell him products from the afterlife with his catchphrase "Hi, Billy Mays here with the...". Mays's son, Billy III, a self-proclaimed South Park fan, said he loved the episode and found its portrayal of his father to be both tasteful and respectful.

He was portrayed by comedian Colin J. Sweeney in the season 1 episode of Epic Rap Battles of History, "Billy Mays vs. Ben Franklin". In the middle of the battle, Mays dies and has his second verse covered by a fellow infomercial pitchman, Vince Offer, portrayed by ERB co-creator Nice Peter.

== Products pitched ==
Product	Description
Awesome Auger	A gardening tool
Big City Slider Station	A mini-burger cooker
Crocodile Cutter	A cutter for metal and other materials
DC Snowboards	Snowboards
The Ding King	A dent repairing device
DualSaw	A circular saw with two blades
Engrave-it	An engraving tool for metal surfaces
ESPN360	A broadband service
EZ Bundler	A strapping tool that bundles objects together
EZ Crunch Bowl	A breakfast cereal bowl that separates cereal from milk, preserving the cereal's crunchiness
Flies Away	A fly trap
Gator Blades	Precision heavy duty windshield wiper blades
Gopher	A tool for grabbing out-of-reach objects
Grabit	A screw removal tool
Grater Plater	A ceramic plate with grater teeth
Green Now!	Lawn fertilizer in a can
Grip Wrench	A strap wrench
Handy Switch	A wireless electric switch
Hercules Hook	A hook for hanging objects on a wall
iCan health insurance	A health insurance benefit group
Impact Gel	A shoe insert
iTie	A necktie with a hidden pocket
Jupiter Jack	A cell phone speaker system for the car
Kaboom!	Tile and shower cleaner
Magic Carry	A harness system that allows the user to pick up two or three times what they can lift normally
Mighty Mendit	A bonding agent for mending cloth
Mighty Putty	An epoxy putty adhesive
Mighty Putty Steel	A metal alloy adhesive putty
Mighty Putty Wood	A non-shrinking epoxy putty for wood
Mighty Shine	A soft powder that removes rust and tarnish from metal objects
Mighty Tape	A self-fusing silicone rubber waterproof tape
Orange Glo	A wood cleaner
OxiClean	A general purpose cleaner
Pest Patrol	A pest repellent which relied on ultrasonic frequencies.
Quick Chop	A chopping device
Quik Strip	A wire stripper
Safety Beep	A stick-on alert device for vehicles moving in reverse
Samurai Shark	A knife sharpener
Simoniz Fix-It	A scratch remover
Simoniz Liquid Diamond	Car polish
Six Shooter	A cordless power drill able to hold up to six different bits
Steam Buddy	A lightweight steam iron
Tool Band-it	A magnetic armband for holding hand tools
Turbo Tiger	A vacuum cleaner
Ultimate Chopper	A kitchen tool
Vidalia Slice Wizard	A kitchen tool
WashMatik	A hose that pumps water from a bucket without being hooked up to a faucet
What Odor?	An odor-removing fluid
Zorbeez	A chamois cloth
