= PitchMen =

American reality television series

- Title card from season two.
- Starring: Billy Mays (2009); Anthony Sullivan
- Narrated by: Thom Beers
- Country of origin: United States
- No. of seasons: 2
- No. of episodes: 18 (16 aired) + 1 special

Production
- Producer: Thom Beers
- Running time: 43 minutes

Original release
- Network: Discovery Channel
- Release: April 15, 2009 – March 8, 2011

PitchMen (original name: But Wait...There's More) is a docudrama television program produced for the Discovery Channel in the United States. The show followed infomercial producers and talent Billy Mays and Anthony "Sully" Sullivan as they attempted to sell various inventions through direct marketing, mainly through Telebrands, one of the largest direct response/infomercial companies. The series was narrated by Thom Beers. Each episode typically focused on two different products.

== History ==
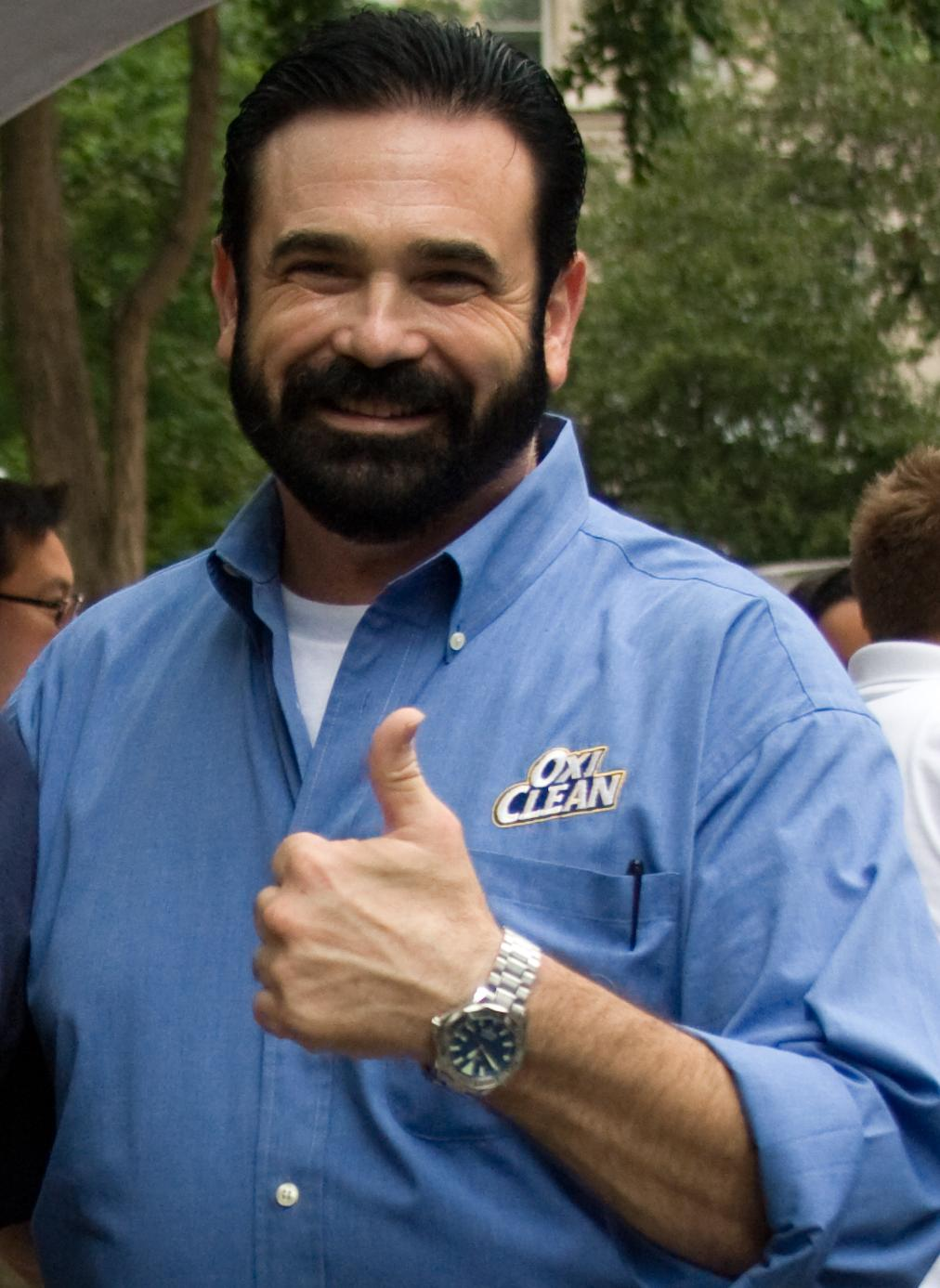
Billy Mays promoted his most notable products on the show, pre-dating back to 2005.

Each episode typically begins with Billy Mays and Anthony Sullivan being pitched different products by their inventors. Two products are then selected and are field tested with peoples' opinions gathered on the products. If successful in the field test, Billy and Sully would create an infomercial which is then produced and played in test markets after which the inventors are notified of the amount of success that the commercial generated. For products that generated a successful level of consumer interest, high praise is given by Billy and Sully. For products that were not successful, the inventor is notified, and the future of the product is discussed briefly including the possibility of collaboration on tweaking the commercial for a later airing date.

It was unknown whether or not the series would continue following Mays' death on June 28, 2009. The Discovery Channel ran an all day marathon of episodes on July 1 as a tribute, which concluded with the season finale, itself edited to end with a tribute to Mays. On July 9, a special tribute episode entitled "Pitchman: A Tribute to Billy Mays" aired with comments from friends, co-workers and family. The status of the second season was undecided until July 15, when a press-release was put out by Discovery to announce that the show would be renewed for a second season, with Mays' son, Billy Mays III, taking his father's place. The second season premiered on August 19, 2010 with solely Anthony Sullivan starring in commercials. Sully sometimes brings in others to help him decide with product such as Telebrands CEO AJ Khubani. However, without Billy Mays on the show, PitchMen was cancelled after two seasons.

== Episodes ==
=== Season 1: 2009 ===
| No. | Title | Original release date |
|---|---|---|
| 1 | "High Impact Item" | April 15, 2009 |
Impact Gel – A shoe insert with special shock-absorbing gel that cushions a person's heel and balls of the feet. GPS Pal: – A device that allows a user to place a GPS navigation system in a cupholder instead of on the windshield. Successful product: Impact Gel
| 2 | "Dual Saw Shuffle" | April 22, 2009 |
DualSaw – a dual-bladed circular saw with blades that revolve in opposing directions allowing a cleaner cut without kickback. It was invented by a French firefighter who came up with the idea for his product after a fellow firefighter lost an eye using a circular saw in a rescue attempt. Shuffles – microfiber pads that are worn on the feet and used as a mop. Successful product: DualSaw
| 3 | "From the Jaws of Victory" | April 29, 2009 |
Jupiter Jack – a cellphone handsfree device that transmits using a vehicle's FM radio. It was originally named Black Jack, but changed due to the trademark not being available. Sharkstopper – an acoustic shark repellent. Successful product: Jupiter Jack
| 4 | "Smells Like Gold" | May 6, 2009 |
What Odor? – An odor removing spray that claims to be non-toxic and environmentally friendly The Vertical Grill – A small folding grill-like grate for grilling food Successful product: What Odor?
| 5 | "Spotting Talent" | May 13, 2009 |
Spot Sucker – a stain remover developed by a teenage high school student that removes stains by way of a vacuum sucking the cleanser through fabric Heel Stick (Marketed as Heel Tastic) – balm designed to treat dry cracked skin on a person's foot Successful products: Spot Sucker and Heel Tastic
| 6 | "Tool Guys" | May 20, 2009 |
GrabIt – a drill bit designed to remove broken or stripped screws by cutting a new hole into the screw and extracting it using a second bit Tool Band-It – a strap that fits around the arm and contains Neodymium magnets to keep tools attached and easy to reach. Successful product: Tool Band-It
| 7 | "Spinning Green" | May 26, 2009 |
A successful pitchwoman, Forbes Riley, hopes to make herself a household name with her new "Spin Gym," but making her infomercial could damage her friendship with Billy and Sully; Billy appears as a guest on The Tonight Show. Successful product: None
| 8 | "Digging for Dollars" | June 3, 2009 |
Billy and Sully have hit a dry spell and hit the road looking for new inventions; Billy helps a handicapped fellow pitchman with his successful product, the Awesome Auger, and films an updated infomercial for it; and Billy and Sully pitch iCan Benefit's health insurance, a type of product they had never pitched before. Successful product: Awesome Auger
| 9 | "Grater Education" | June 10, 2009 |
A former pitchman and cancer survivor gets assistance from Billy and Sully, who pitch his handmade product, the Grater Plater; Billy and the team shoot a scene for Mighty Putty, by using the product to tow HMS Bounty. The team is also invited to lecture at Princeton University. Successful product: Grater Plater
| 10 | "Tale of Three Billys" | June 17, 2009 |
Bill Mays, Sr. (Billy's father) pitches the "Turn, Don't Burn", and Billy and Sully help Billy Mays III (son) direct his first commercial for a local restaurant owned by his brother-in-law. Successful products: Green Now, Ragazzi's Restaurant and Turn, Don't Burn
| 11 | "Crunch Time" | June 24, 2009 |
Billy and Sully pitch the Gator Blades using a device named the 'Bug Bazooka.' and pitch the "EZ Crunch Bowl" which was invented by Survivor: Africa winner Ethan Zohn. Successful products: EZ Crunch Bowl and Bug Bazooka
| 12 | "Revenge of the Pitchmen" | July 1, 2009 |
After Vince Offer pitches similar products (ShamWow and the Slap Chop), Billy and Sully counter by relaunching the similar products they advertised, Zorbeez and Quick Chop. Billy and Sully then compete against each other in a pitch-off in Philadelphia. Sully hires two workers to bother Billy, and pays people to buy his product, although Billy still wins. Successful products: Zorbeez and Quick Chop

=== Pitchman: A Tribute to Billy Mays ===
| No. | Title | Original release date |
|---|---|---|
| 13 | "Pitchman: A Tribute to Billy Mays" | July 9, 2009 |
The Discovery Channel aired a special Billy Mays tribute episode of PitchMen called "Pitchman: A Tribute to Billy Mays". The show documented Mays' early life and his rise to fame, with commentary from his friends and family and showing video from his funeral including the pallbearers dressed in Mays' trademark blue shirt and khaki pants, ending with an emotional farewell from fellow PitchMen host Anthony Sullivan.

=== Season 2: 2010–2011 ===
On July 15, 2009, Discovery Channel announced they were renewing the show for a second season, with Mays' eponymous son Billy Mays III joining Anthony Sullivan and Thom Beers. The second season premiered on August 19, 2010. Starting September 2, 2010, Discovery Channel has removed PitchMen from its regular Thursday night at 9 p.m. slot without any explanation. However, new episodes returned to Discovery Channel beginning January 18, 2011, but with only Anthony Sullivan helming the show. But on its website, Discovery Channel has trimmed the list of season 2 episodes to five, indicating the possibility the series has been cancelled, although no official cancellation announcement has been made.

| No. | Title | Original release date |
|---|---|---|
| 14 | "Passing the Torch" | August 19, 2010 |
Invention season is back in full force with Sully leading the charge. A Marine puts his innovative flashlight to the test, while an inventor tries to pass on his father's legacy with a product that could save lives. The HexLight – An arm mounted, hands-free flashlight. Cold Fire – A non-toxic, biodegradable liquid fire-extinguisher in a can.
| 15 | "Heart Wrench" | August 26, 2010 |
After an exhaustive search, Sully finds a teenage inventor who developed the Select-A-Wrench, a multi-wrench tool that allows for multiple wrench sizes in one unit. However, the youngster is heartbroken after learning that his invention has already been patented. Sully then enlists help from a veteran duo of inventors to tweak the teenager's idea to gain a patent of his own. Select-A-Wrench – A multi-wrench tool.
| 16 | "Bear Market" | January 18, 2011 |
Sully teams up with an LA radio host to find the next great invention and discovers a young inventor who made millions during the dot com boom and is now searching for another purpose in life. The inventor came with two products, the Fridge Locker, a small cage to protect food from co-workers, as well as the RX Locker, a lockable medication case to keep children and addicts from others' prescription drugs. Sully risks life and limb with a grizzly bear to test the Fridge Locker, while celebrity addiction doctor, Dr. Drew Pinsky, helps pitch the RX Locker. Meanwhile, two experienced brother inventors pour their life savings into the ShaveMate, a razor blade with six razors and a shaving cream dispenser built into the handle. Billy Mays was set to shave off his iconic beard for the product, but following his death, Sully struggles with pitching the new product. Fridge Locker – A lockable cage for food items in the refrigerator. RX Locker – A lockable case for prescription drugs. ShaveMate – A razor blade with built-in shaving cream dispenser.
| 17 | "The New Gun in Town" | January 25, 2011 |
Sully and assistant Kennedy head to a Chicago home and houseware convention to hear some sometimes crazy pitches for the "next big thing", including an easy stringer and a tater tornado. Then, Sully heads to the circus to test a revolutionary new needle. EZ Stringer (Boardwalk) Tater Tornado; One Second Needle
| 18 | "From the Jaws of Victory" | February 1, 2011 |
Sully sifts through thousands of inventions to find a robot whisk, but design problems loom. A man's desire to make his wife's life easier leads to a sharp food wrap invention. And a fitness fanatic pitches Sully gravity-defying workout boots. RoboStir; Wraptor Teeth; Power Jumpers
| 19 | "The Cutting Edge" | February 8, 2011 |
A young inventor hooks Sully with a collapsing trashcan, but a manufacturing short-cut may destroy the product's future. Two friends think a simple piece of plastic can keep you safe from intruders. A legendary knife man gets a chance at one last pitch. Collapsican; KeyPout; The Amazing Knife
| 20 | "Wave of Success" | February 15, 2011 |
An inventor risks everything to get his Stadium Back chair – and his face – on the air. A mother of four puts it all on the line with her simple alternative to the chip clip. Then, Sully and Kennedy try out an electric skateboard. Stadium Back; Ba'Noodle; E-Glide
| 21 | "Fighting Shape" | February 22, 2011 |
Sully puts out a call for fitness products; a female fitness star comes back to the spotlight with her "Chest Magic" machine. Also, BMXers test two new concepts: one, a "bicycle meets elliptical trainer," and the other, a "bicycle meets rowing machine." Chest Magic; StreetStrider; RowBike
| 22 | "Fishing for Gold" | March 1, 2011 |
Sully mixes business and pleasure testing a Frisbee flying fishing tool. An inventor also hooks Sully's heart with a fitness tool a man invents to save his best friend's life. Sully and Kennedy field test a patent pro's new suction device. Cool Caster; Lightning Rod; Tie Pods
| 23 | "On a Wing and a Prayer" | March 8, 2011 |
Sully shares his tricks of the trade with 3 junior pitchmen and endures some of the adults' less successful pitches. A fighter pilot pitches his new fitness tool, and a friend comes out of his own pitchman retirement with "Flippin Sticks." Shower Pal; FT101 Fitness Trainer; Flippin Stick

== Billy Mays tribute marathon ==
On July 1, 2009, as a tribute to Billy Mays, the Discovery Channel aired an all-day marathon of PitchMen leading up to the show's season finale. Commercial breaks during the marathon included one of several brief tributes saluting Mays. The channel's digital on-screen graphic featured his photograph, along with the words Billy Mays Jr. 1958‍–‍2009.

== See also ==
- Billy Mays § Products pitched
- As seen on TV
- New product development
- Pitch People
