= Pitch People =

1999 documentary film

Pitch People (1999 film) is a 1999 American documentary feature film about advertising "pitchmen" and "pitch women". Written and directed by Stanley Jacobs, the film includes interviews with many of the sales industry's pitch people including Arnold Morris, Sandy Mason, Lester Morris, Wally Nash, Ed McMahon and Ron Popeil.

The film is an energetic inside look at the history of this dynamic world that started in Europe, made its way to the boardwalks of the United States and exploded on late night television. It's the true story of the world's second oldest profession, featuring many of the greatest pitch men and women of their time who became famous to millions with the advent of direct response television advertising.

Pitch People screened at several festivals in 2000, including the Rhode Island International Film Festival, Mill Valley Film Festival (No. 23), Boston Film Festival and Palm Beach Film International Festival.

During the 2020 Covid pandemic when production activities were idled in the United States, Jacobs decided to keep himself and the artists he has worked with busy by restoring the original film. Since it has never been available to streaming services it was an opportunity to re-launch the film.

The film’s 35mm interpositive A/B rolls were pulled out of storage, but it discovered they were damaged by the clear leader used to checkerboard the shots. However, the original Super 16mm film A/B rolls remained undamaged. Jacobs had the lab scan the original Kodak Vision Super 16mm negative to 5K and those files, along with today’s talented restorationists and powerful digital tools, were employed to resurrect the entire film. A quarter of a century later, thanks to the new distribution opportunities now available to filmmakers via streaming platforms, this cultural document was made available to audiences worldwide in 2024.

== See also ==
- Salesman (1969 film)
- PitchMen (television reality series)

== External links and Reviews ==
- Pitch People at IMDb
- https://www.latimes.com/archives/la-xpm-2001-jun-14-ca-10202-story.html
- https://www.austinchronicle.com/events/film/2001-05-18/pitch-people/
