= Anthony Sullivan (pitchman) =

British television personality

Anthony Sullivan is a British pitchman of "As seen on TV" products in the United States.

== Career ==
In the early 1990s, Sullivan moved to the United States to sell the "Smart Mop", which he later pitched on HSN, and meeting fellow pitchman Billy Mays. In 1998, HSN hired Sullivan as a network show host.

In 2009, Sullivan and Mays starred in the Discovery Channel reality series PitchMen, where the duo evaluated new products. They appeared on an episode of The Tonight Show with Conan O'Brien five days before the Mays's death.

Sullivan founded Sullivan Productions, a television production and marketing company which in 2023 transitioned into Sugar AI, a digital marketing agency focused on consumer brands. In 2019, Sullivan founded MONTKUSH, an organic wellness company and farm in Vermont.
