= As seen on TV =

Product seal

A typical logo

"As seen on TV" is a generic phrase for products advertised on television in the United States for direct‑response mail-order through a toll-free telephone number. As Seen on TV advertisements, known as infomercials, are usually 30-minute shows or two-minute spots during commercial breaks. These products can range from kitchen, household, automotive, cleaning, health, beauty, and pet care products, to exercise and fitness products, books, or to toys and games for children. Typically, the packaging for these items includes a red seal in the shape of a CRT television screen with the words "AS SEEN ON TV" in white.

Prominent marketers of As seen on TV products include As Seen on TV, Inc., Time Life, Space Bag, K-tel, Ronco, and Thane. There are also retail brick and mortar and online stores that specifically sell As seen on TV products.

In 1996, "As seen on TV" then moved on to retail, according to A. J. Khubani, CEO of Telebrands, who designed the logo.

As seen on TV products then moved on to sell on the internet. In 2015, a new As seen on TV corporation was formed and launched as a multi-vendor marketplace, allowing manufacturers and sellers of TV products to sell their inventory through its website New Easy.

The red logo and phrase is in the public domain and can be used on packaging or in business with no fee and without trademark infringement.

Companies that produce generic versions of As seen on TV products may use a modified version of the red logo, their version displaying "Like on TV" or "As seen on TV in some countries". This logo can be registered in some countries like a trademark.

== See also ==
- Brand-new
- Infomercial
