= Len Steckler =

American film producer

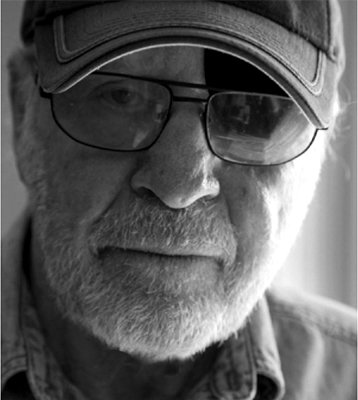
- Photo by Owen Roilzman
- Born: May 6, 1928; Brooklyn, New York, U.S.
- Died: August 11, 2016 (aged 88); Los Angeles, California, U.S.
- Education: Art Student's League
- Occupations: Photographer; illustrator; filmmaker
- Spouse: Enid Steckler
- Children: Jeremy; Morgan

Len Steckler (May 6, 1928 – August 11, 2016) was an American photographer, illustrator, and filmmaker. Steckler was known for the artistry behind many famous ad campaigns, including Pepsi Cola's "Refreshes Without Filling" illustrations in the 1950s, Noxzema's "Take it off — Take it all off" television commercials in the early 1970s, and an ad featuring Joe Namath in Hanes pantyhose. In 2010, he received widespread attention for the release of a previously unknown series of photographs, entitled Marilyn Monroe: The Visit, which offered a candid glimpse of a 1961 encounter between Monroe and famed poet Carl Sandburg.

Steckler began his artistic career with painting. The youngest member of New York's Society of Illustrators, he painted illustrations for short and serialized stories that appeared in leading magazines of the day. As photography gradually replaced illustration, however, Steckler segued to a full-time career as a photographer.

With major clients such as Pepsi Cola, Max Factor, Revlon, and Helena Rubinstein, Steckler's work was featured in magazines such as Ladies' Home Journal, McCall's, Playboy, and Look, and made the cover of publications such as Good Housekeeping (1962–66), The Saturday Evening Post (1962–66), Popular Photography (1961–68), and Camera (1968–71).

== Celebrities ==
Among Steckler's subjects were some of the most famous personalities in the world, including:

- Marilyn Monroe
- Carl Sandburg
- John Wayne
- Joe Namath
- Andrés Segovia
- Joanne Woodward
- Julie Newmar

== Models ==
Often working with hi-end models of the time, Steckler became known for his shots of beautiful women. A much abbreviated list:

- Suzy Parker
- Tippi Hedren
- Cheryl Tiegs
- Jennifer O'Neill
- Erin Gray

== Television Commercials ==
For the next phase of his career, Steckler turned to directing television commercials. He made an impact on the medium with innovations such as solarization, extreme slow-motion and the use of subliminal imagery. Perhaps his most well known TV ad came in 1974, when he put NFL quarterback Joe Namath in pantyhose for a Hanes Beauty Mist commercial. Steckler won many awards for his commercial work, including numerous Clio awards, the Silver Lion (Leone d'Argento) of the Venice Film Festival (1970) and from such institutions as the Art Directors Club, the American Institute of Graphic Arts (AIGA), and The Chicago 4 Awards. A number of his commercials have been included in the collection of the Museum of Television and Radio. Some of his prominent clients have included:

- United Airlines
- Yves Saint Laurent
- Johnson & Johnson
- Miller Brewing Company
- AT&T
- Parfums Givenchy
- Noxell Corporation (Noxzema, Cover Girl)
- Woolite
- Colgate-Palmolive
- Progresso
- Ivory Soap
- Hanes
- Celanese Corporation
- Wamsutta
- Serta

== Film ==
In 1974, Steckler directed and filmed the live-action sequences for the Emmy award-winning television special, Free to Be... You and Me. Upon moving to Los Angeles in 1976, Steckler began directing and producing movies for television, including “Mad Bull” (1977), “Rodeo Girl” (1980), “The Demon Murders” (1983), and “Mercy or Murder” (1987),.

Steckler is a collected and exhibited artist and photographer.

In 2005, Steckler lost his left eye to cancer.

In late 2009, Steckler's son came upon a set of long-forgotten photographs that Len Steckler had taken of Marilyn Monroe meeting with Carl Sandburg eight months before her death. The series of photographs, entitled "The Visit" was made available to the public in limited quantities. As a result of this discovery, and of their subsequent release to the public, Len Steckler appeared on the “Today Show” (February, 2010) and was interviewed by Meredith Vieira about that day in December 1961.
