= Henry Hoyt =

Henry Hoyt may refer to:

- Henry Hoyt (bookseller), 19th century publisher and bookseller in Boston, Massachusetts, USA
- Henry M. Hoyt (1830–1892), 18th governor of Pennsylvania, USA
- Henry M. Hoyt (Solicitor General) (1856–1910), solicitor general of the US and son of the above
- Henry Hamilton Hoyt Sr. (1895–1990), president of Carter products division of Carter-Wallace
- Henry Harrison Hoyt (1840–?), Wisconsin state assemblyman
