= Meda AB =

Swedish healthcare company

- Founded: June 6, 1991; 35 years ago
- Headquarters: Solna, Sweden
- Revenue: SEK 15 billion (2014)
- Number of employees: 5,202 (2014)
- Parent: Viatris
- Divisions: MedPointe

Meda AB is a specialty pharmaceutical company, headquartered in Solna, Sweden. Meda imports and markets pharmaceuticals, nutritional, and health-care products, and offers services including clinical research, registration, and logistics. At the end of 2014, Meda had 5,202 employees. Meda's pharmaceuticals are currently sold in more than 150 countries.

Meda was listed on the Stockholm Stock Exchange until it was acquired by Mylan in 2016 through a cash and stock offer valued €7.2 billion.

== Mergers, acquisitions and divestments ==
In 2005, Meda bought German pharmaceutical brand Viatris GMBH from Advent International for €750million ($926 million).

On 20 July 2007, Meda announced an $800 million cash-and-stock deal to buy the New Jersey–based pharmaceutical company MedPointe from a group of U.S. investors. MedPointe bought the diagnostics and drug businesses of Carter-Wallace in 2001, with the consumer product line going to Church & Dwight. The deal was completed on 22 August with Meda entering the US market. The new shareholders in Meda are The Carlyle Group, The Cypress Group LLC, and other US investors, who had a combined shareholding in Meda of approximately 7%.

In 2014, Meda acquired the Italian firm Rottapharm Madaus in order to add consumer health products to their portfolio. Meda explored in 2015 the possibility of divesting its United States division, Meda Pharmaceuticals, to raise funds for expansion in other areas.
