= Merle Leland Youngs =

Manufacturer of Trojan condoms (1886–1958)

Merle Leland Youngs (December 2, 1886 – October 8, 1958) was the manufacturer of Trojan condoms in Trenton, New Jersey, at Youngs Rubber. He was chairman of the board, treasurer and director. He was one of the first to advertise condoms to pharmacists and doctors. The brands were sold to Charlie Chrisman and in 2001 to Church and Dwight.

== Biography ==
He was born on December 2, 1886, in New York. He died on October 8, 1958.
