= Celsius Holdings =

American energy drink company

Celsius Holdings, Inc.
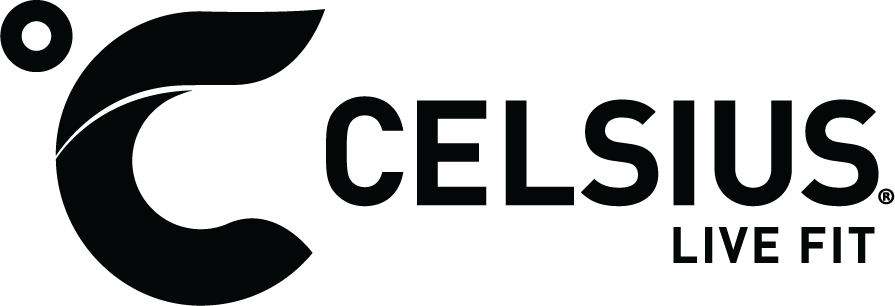

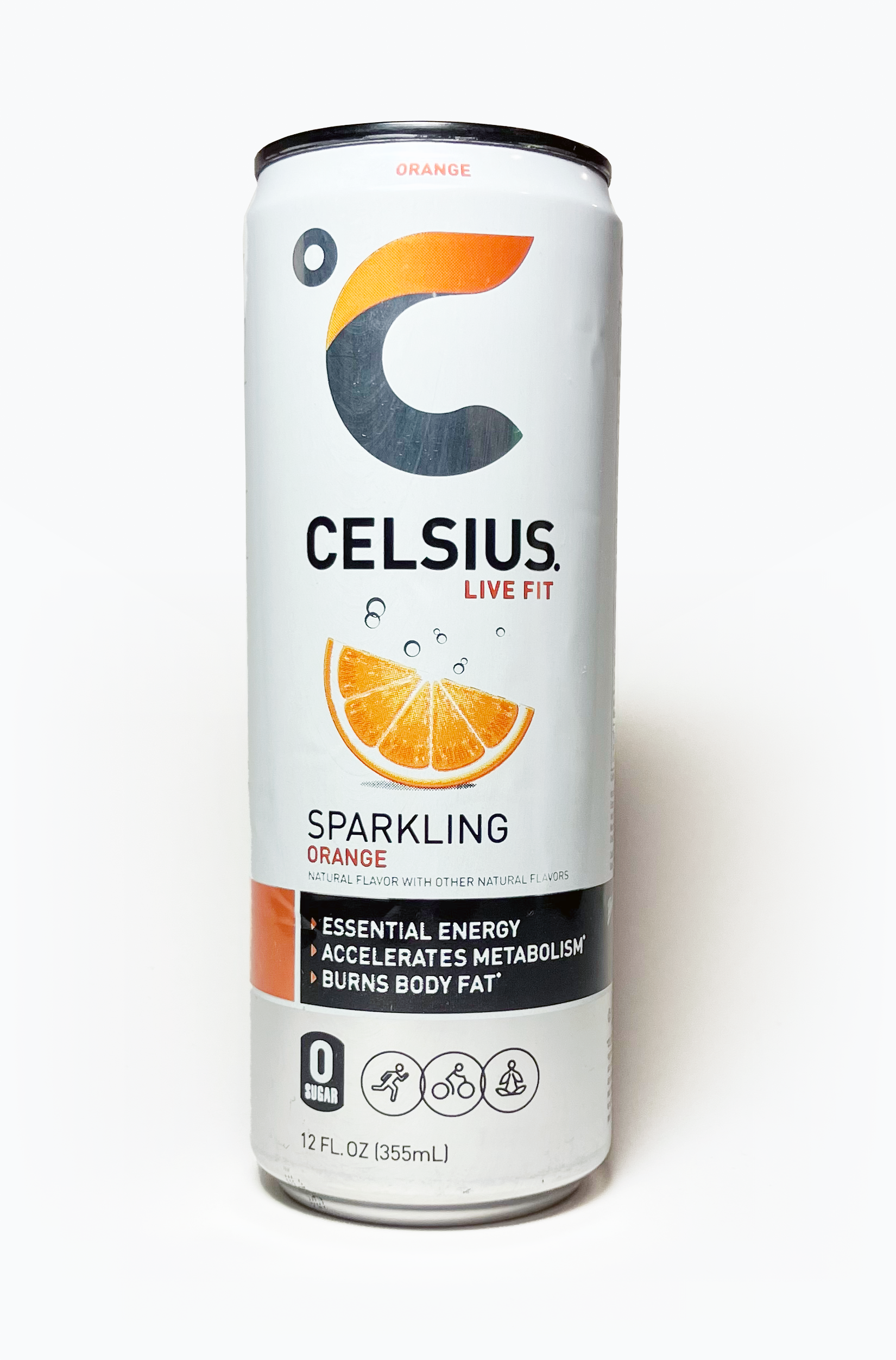
- A can of Celsius, the product associated with Celsius Holdings
- Formerly: Vector Ventures, Inc.
- Type: Public
- Traded as: Nasdaq: CELH; S&P 400 component
- ISIN: US15118V2079
- Industry: Beverage
- Founded: 2004; 22 years ago
- Headquarters: Boca Raton, Florida, U.S.
- Key people: John Fieldly (President & CEO)
- Revenue: ▲US$1.32 billion (2023)
- Operating income: ▲US$233 million (2023)
- Net income: ▲US$227 million (2023)
- Total assets: ▲US$1.54 billion (2023)
- Number of employees: 765 (2023)
- Website: celsius.com

Celsius Holdings, Inc. is an American company that produces a range of energy drinks under the brand name Celsius. The company's products are no-sugar and have caffeine, taurine, guarana extract and vitamins. The drinks are marketed as healthy, to which the CEO attributes the brand's success, but has drawn criticism from nutritionists.

== History ==
The Celsius beverage concept and trademark was created by Greg Horn in 2003 and later licensed to Elite FX; a company was later founded in 2004 by Molly Kate Roberts, Lucy Kate Gaunt, Caroline Rueff, Irina Lorenzi, and Steve Haley. In 2009, the company launched the first energy drink in Sweden and ended with a revenue of 5.86 million. By 2012, the company had a market capitalization of approximately $5 million. Five years later, in 2017, Celsius was listed on the NASDAQ. By the end of that year, Celsius Holdings had an annual revenue of almost $36 million.

In 2022, Celsius CEO John Fieldly told GQ roughly 95% of stores around the country are stocked with Celsius, due to the $550 million investment made by PepsiCo.

As of August 2024, Celsius held an 11% market share of the $19 billion energy drink industry, generating over $1.3 billion in revenue and a market capitalization of roughly $9 billion. The company's success is attributed to its alignment with current consumer preferences, such as increased caffeine content, appeal to health-conscious consumers, and a focus on fruit-flavored products rather than chemically-tasting alternatives.

In February 2025, Celsius Holdings announced plans to acquire Alani Nutrition LLC (Alani Nu) for $1.8 billion in a cash and stock deal. Founded in 2018, Alani Nu is a female-focused health and wellness brand offering functional beverages and products. This acquisition aims to create a leading better-for-you functional lifestyle platform, combining two rapidly growing energy drink brands to capitalize on the increasing consumer demand for zero-sugar alternatives.

On March 3, 2025, Celsius Holdings announced that Eric Hanson would be appointed as President and Chief Operating Officer, effective March 24, 2025.

== Products ==
=== Product lines ===
Celsius has different product lines that contain different caffeine levels.

Current Product Lines (all values are per one 12 oz can)
Product name	Caffeine	Calories	Carbs
Celsius Live Fit	200 mg	10 kcal	0 g
Celsius Essentials	270 mg	10 kcal	0 g
Celsius On-The-Go	200 mg	10 kcal	1 g

Discontinued Product Lines (all values are per one 12 oz can)
Product name	Caffeine	Calories	Carbs
Celsius BCAA+ Energy	100 mg	15 kcal	2 g
Celsius Heat	300 mg	10 kcal	10 g
Celsius with Stevia	200 mg	10 kcal	10 g

=== Composition ===
Celsius Energy Drink
Nutritional value per 12 fl. oz (355 mL)
- Energy: 10 kcal (42 kJ)
- Carbohydrates: 0 mg
- Fat: 0 mg
- Protein: 0 mg
Vitamins and minerals
Vitamins	Quantity %DV^{†}
Riboflavin (B2)	131% 1.7 mg
Niacin (B3)	125% 20 mg
Pantothenic acid (B5)	200% 10 mg
Vitamin B6	0% 2 μg
Vitamin B12	250% 6 μg
Vitamin C	67% 60 mg
Minerals	Quantity %DV^{†}
Calcium	4% 50 mg
Sodium	0% 5 mg
- Other constituents: Quantity
- Caffeine: 200 mg
- ^{†}Percentages estimated using US recommendations for adults.

==== Ingredients ====
Celsius contains green tea extract, which contains an antioxidant known as epigallocatechin gallate (EGCG). Guarana seed extract further increases caffeine content. Ginger root is used as both a flavoring agent and for anti-inflammatory effects.

==== Caffeine ====
Celsius contains 200 mg – 270 mg of caffeine, depending on the product line and size of the can.

== Partnerships and sponsorships ==
=== Major investments ===
Carl DeSantis was an early investor in Celsius Holdings. DeSantis invested throughout the company's development because the product line interested him. In 2010, he agreed to extend a $3 million dollar credit line for an advertising campaign to promote Celsius's new products, but the money did not create the outcome expected. As a stakeholder, he provided advice to the Celsius team and assisted with leadership changes in 2012 when the company was not meeting the expected business goals. DeSantis died having earned $1.2 billion dollars from a 31% stake in Celsius Holdings.

PepsiCo invested $550 million in Celsius Holdings, an 8.5% minority stake.

=== Marketing in colleges ===
Celsius Holdings partnered with Learfield, a collegiate sports marketing company, to form partnerships with college students. In 2023, the brand began partnering with college football quarterbacks Bo Nix (University of Oregon) and Michael Penix Jr. (University of Washington).

In January 2024, Celsius began partnering with college basketball basketball players JuJu Watkins, Jared McCain, Cody Williams, and Kwame Evans Jr..

"Celsius University" was created in 2022 as a student ambassador program, paying students to promote the product line on college campuses.

Celsius Holdings further partnered with influencers, such as Jake Paul and David Dobrik to promote the Celsius products.

=== Motorsports sponsorship ===
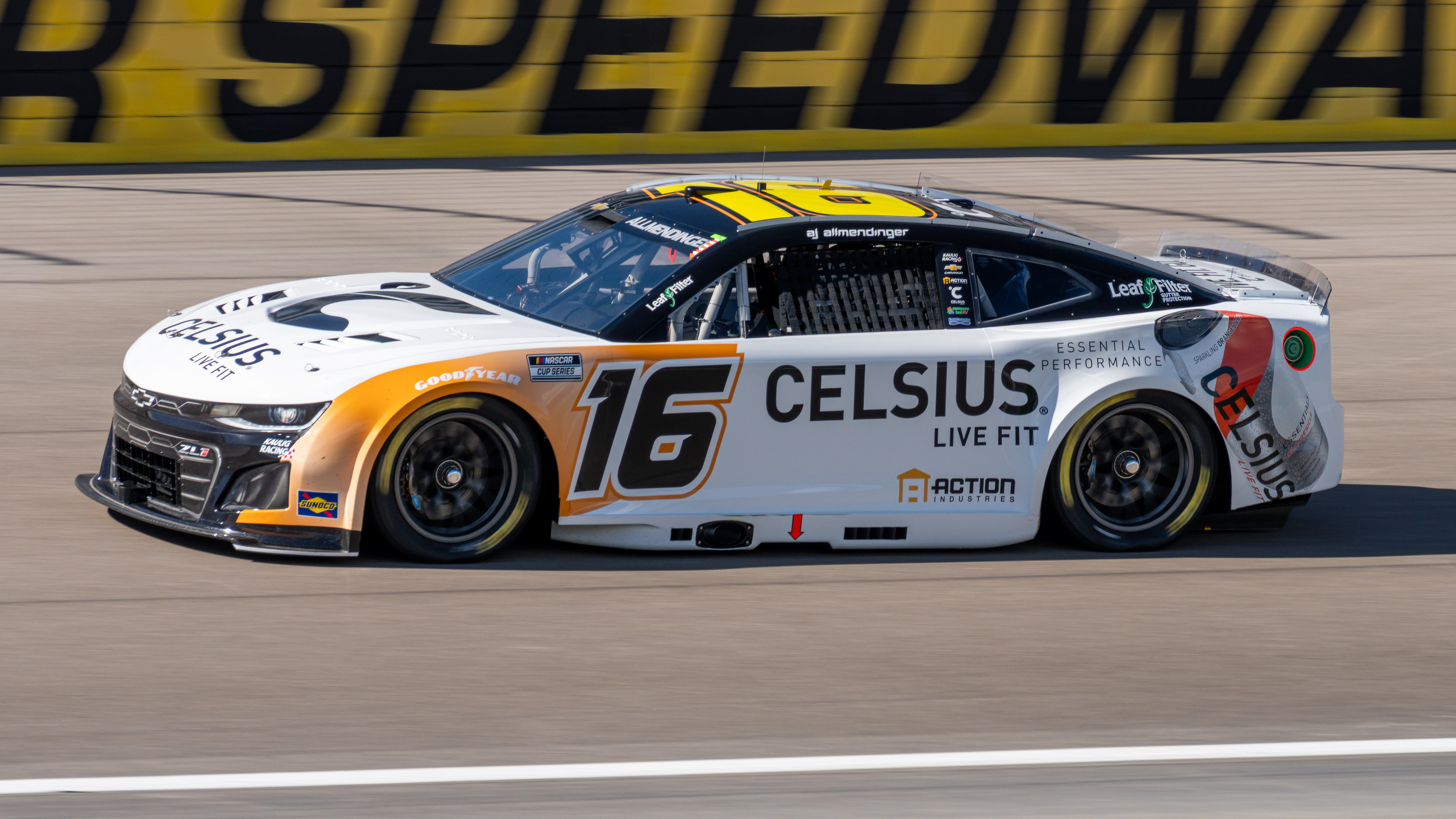
Allmendinger's No. 16 car during practice for the 2025 South Point 400

Early in the company's history, it began sponsoring motorsports entries through series such as NASCAR and Formula One. As of 2026, the company sponsors Kaulig Racing, Jordan Anderson Racing, Rackley W.A.R., RFK Racing in NASCAR, and Aston Martin in Formula 1.

They have previously sponsored Tricon Garage in NASCAR and Scuderia Ferrari in Formula One.

==== Motorsports brand ambassadors ====
===== NASCAR =====
- A. J. Allmendinger, NASCAR Cup Series
- Toni Breidinger, NASCAR Craftsman Truck Series
- Jeb Burton, NASCAR O'Reilly Auto Parts Series
- Justin Haley, NASCAR Craftsman Truck Series
- Corey Heim, NASCAR Cup Series
- Corey LaJoie, NASCAR Cup Series
- Ryan Preece, NASCAR Cup Series

===== Formula One =====
- Fernando Alonso, Formula One
- Lance Stroll, Formula One

==== Former brand ambassadors ====
- William Byron, NASCAR Cup Series
- Christian Eckes, NASCAR O’Reilly Auto Parts Series
- Emerson Fittipaldi, retired Formula One
- Lewis Hamilton, Formula One
- Brad Keselowski, NASCAR Cup Series
- Blake Koch, former NASCAR driver
- Charles Leclerc, Formula One
- Logan Misuraca, ARCA Menards Series

== Litigation ==
=== Flo Rida lawsuit ===
Celsius Holdings faced a lawsuit in 2021 with rapper Flo Rida for a breach of contract when the company allegedly withheld details about revenue. Flo Rida was a contracted brand ambassador from 2014 to 2018, which brought Celsius to concerts and events to help expand the brand. The Florida court ruled in Flo Rida's favor that Celsius Holdings was in breach of contract as Flo Rida's publicity assisted in the company's growth. Flo Rida was awarded $82.6 million in January 2023 due to the lawsuit. The judgment was upheld on appeal in December 2024, though possibly with a lower amount awarded.

=== Class-action lawsuit ===
Celsius faced a class-action lawsuit in November 2022 for allegedly misleading customers that the product contained no preservatives, even though they contain citric acid. The company denied the claim, maintaining that citric acid was used as a flavoring agent. The lawsuit was settled out of court in February 2023.
