= Ajax Motor Vehicle Company =

Defunct American motor vehicle manufacturer

Ajax Motor Vehicle Company was a now-defunct American brass era electric car manufacturer established in New York City, which operated from 1901 until 1903. It produced the Ajax Electric car. Its factory was located at 220 West 36th Street, just north of the famed Macy's Department Store in Manhattan.

== History ==
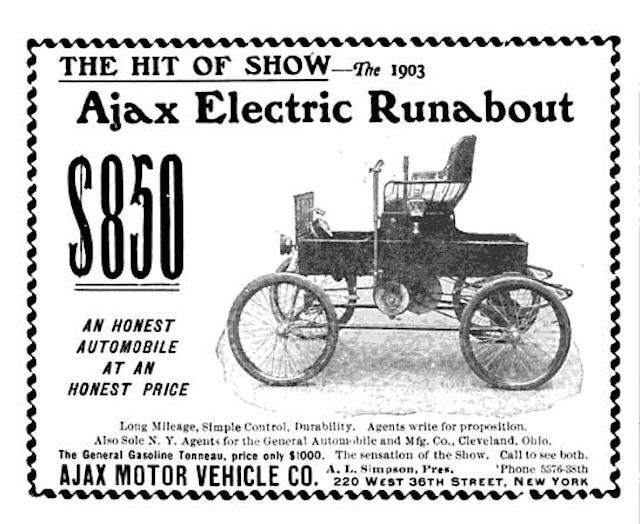
1903 Ajax Electric Runabout in print advertisement

Ajax Motor Vehicle Company was formed by New York City brothers Walter Simpson and Alfred L. Simpson, with an initial capitalization of US$10,000. They set up manufacturing in July 1901, in a factory located on Manhattan's West 36th Street, not far from Macy's.

The company produced an open two-seat lightweight runabout that rode on narrow 28 inch wire wheels with pneumatic tires and optional mudguards. It was originally priced at US$1,100, but later reduced to $850. The frame of the car was similar to bicycle construction, with seamless-drawn steel tubing, joined by brazing into drop-forged lugs. The 24V electric motor was rated at 1 1/2 bhp and had a chain drive to the rear axle and differential. Mechanical brakes were provided on both rear axle and motor. Steering was by a crosswise tiller to the left seat.

Ajax had a display at the 1903 New York Auto Show, but closed later that year. This may have been precipitated by the 1902 collapse in the US electric car market, following dubious selling of electric car stocks, and a high-profile accident to a racing Baker. No cars were sold outside New York City.

The company's forearm and clenched fist logo predated the similar one used by Arm & Hammer. They later used the slogan, "An Honest Automobile At An Honest Price".

Today, a car in original condition could be worth in excess of $14,000.
