= Noxzema =

Brand of skin cleanser marketed by Elida Beauty

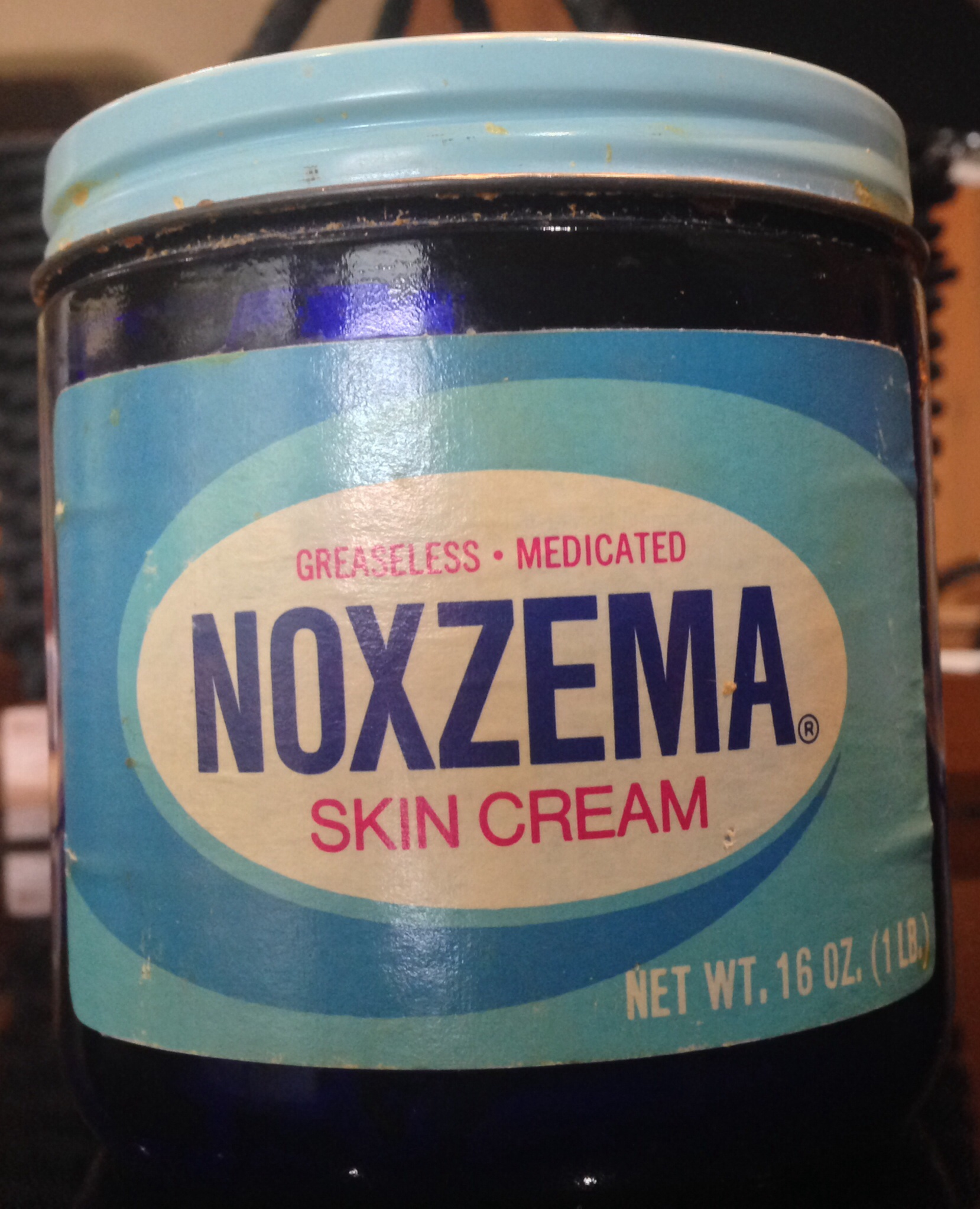
- Product type: Facial Products
- Current owner: Evermark
- Introduced: 1914; 112 years ago
- Previous owners: Noxzema Chemical Company; Noxell Corporation; Lion Corporation; Procter & Gamble; Alberto-Culver
- Website: http://www.noxzema.com/

Noxzema (/nɒkˈsiːmə/ nok-SEE-mə) is an American brand of skin cleanser marketed by Evermark. Since 1914, it was sold in a small cobalt blue jar; it is now sold in a blue plastic jar. Noxzema contains camphor, menthol, phenol and eucalyptus, among other ingredients. Originally developed as a sunburn remedy, it is a type of cold cream or vanishing cream (so named because it disappears after being left on for a few minutes) which is used as a facial cleanser and make-up remover.

It can also be used for soothing chapped, sunburned, or otherwise irritated skin, and for getting rid of acne and other blemishes (as it draws dirt out of pores when left on for a few minutes or more). Since the introduction of Noxzema, the brand name has appeared on shaving cream, razors, and skin-cleansing cloths.

The main product and its line extensions have been marketed by a series of companies: Noxzema Chemical Company, Noxell Corporation, Procter & Gamble, and Alberto-Culver (Unilever).

== History ==
The original formula for Noxzema was invented by Dr. Francis J. Townsend (1875–1945), a physician/druggist by 1900, in Snow Hill, Maryland; by 1910, in Berlin, Maryland; and by 1920, in Ocean City, Maryland. The formula was called "Townsend R22" and referred to commonly as "no-eczema". Dr. Townsend, who practiced near the beaches of the Atlantic Ocean, prescribed it as a remedy, mainly to beach resort vacationers who were severely burned by ultraviolet sun rays.

Townsend later gave the formula to druggist George Avery Bunting (1870–1959), who for many years denied the transaction. In about 1917, Bunting began producing and selling "Dr. Bunting's Sunburn Remedy", marketing the product as an alternative to the greasy, tallow-based medicating creams in use during the period. For the first three years, George A. Bunting and Elizabeth Buck mixed, heated and poured the product themselves. The name was changed to Noxzema, supposedly because a satisfied customer exclaimed, "Sure knocked my eczema!". An early slogan was "The miracle cream of Baltimore".

=== Ownership ===
Beginning in 1920, the cream was produced by Bunting. In 1926, Noxzema Chemical Company broke ground and built a small factory in Baltimore, Maryland at the corner of W. 32 St. & Falls Cliff Rd. In 1926, N.C.C. applied for a trade-mark with the U.S. Patent Office. By 1937, 15 million units were being sold yearly.

By the 1940s, the product was being sold throughout the United States, and it continued to be produced by the Noxzema Chemical Company. Management moved to the founder's son in 1949. In 1966, the company was reorganized Noxell Corporation, but still under the ownership of the Bunting family. Under a non-family member's leadership, the company "moved its headquarters to a building complex in Cockeysville, MD."

In 1989, Procter & Gamble acquired the brand as part of the acquisition of Noxell. Alberto-Culver bought the rights to the brand in 2008 from Procter & Gamble and operated the line of skin-care products until Alberto-Culver was acquired by Unilever in 2010. In October 2014, the Noxzema brand in Greece changed its ownership from Procter & Gamble to a domestic company, Sarantis, for €8.7 million.

== Advertising ==
Advertising, which had begun in the 1940s, via radio and print advertisements, was handled locally.

From 1966 to 1973, Gunilla Knutsson appeared in national TV commercials and magazine advertisements for Noxzema shaving cream (shaving cream in an aerosol can), in which she famously said, "Take it off. Take it all off."

In 1998 Procter & Gamble unveiled "a foray into so-called nontraditional media" as "a break from traditional Noxzema advertising" in order to "stimulate sales of Noxzema skin cream among women ages 21 and over." In 1999 they introduced and advertised product line extensions.
