= Arrid =

American antiperspirant and deodorant brand

- Current owner: Church & Dwight
- Country: 1935 by Carter Products
- Website: Official Website

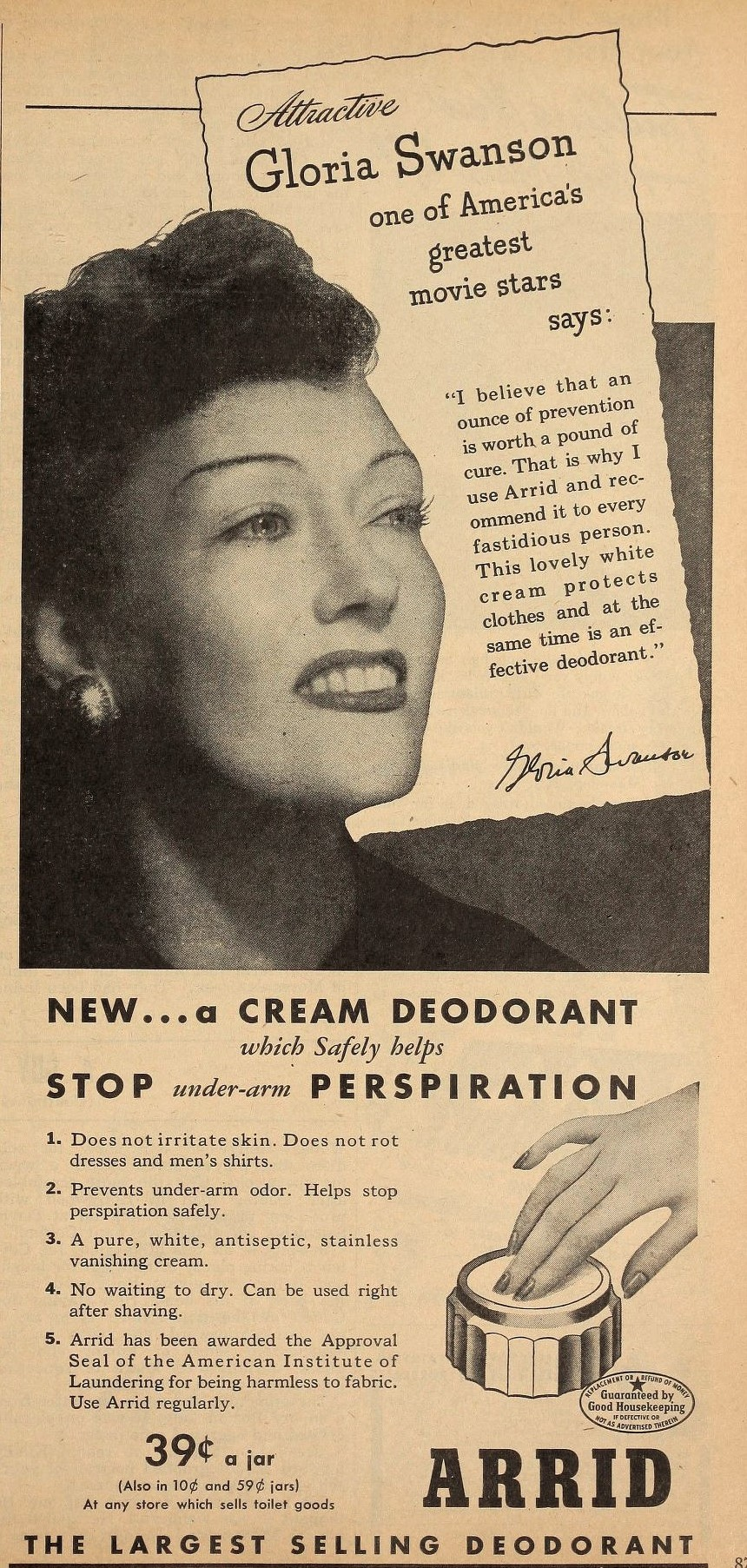
1944 Advertisement for Arrid

Arrid is a type of antiperspirant and deodorant originally introduced in 1935 by Carter Products and was acquired by Church & Dwight in 2001. The active ingredient is up to 20% aluminium zirconium tetrachlorohydrex gly.

== Products ==
Arrid deodorants and antiperspirants come in five different forms: solids, clear gels, sprays, roll-ons and cream.

== Advertising ==
During the 1940s and 1950s, its famous slogan was "Don't be half-safe—use Arrid to be sure", which gave rise to Half-Safe, the name of the amphibious vehicle which Ben Carlin used to circumnavigate the world in the mid 20th century.

In 1993, Arrid was backed by a $14 million television campaign, $1.4 million in radio and $3 million in print support.

In the 2000s, one of its most popular slogans was "Stress stinks! Arrid works!"

== Ingredients ==
Each of Arrid's deodorants contain a different active ingredient. In their solid and clear gel deodorant, the active ingredient is aluminum zirconium tetrachlorohydrex gly. The active ingredient in their spray deodorant is aluminum chlorohydrate and the active ingredient in their cream is aluminum sesquichlorohydrate.
