= Arm and hammer =

Symbol of an arm holding a hammer

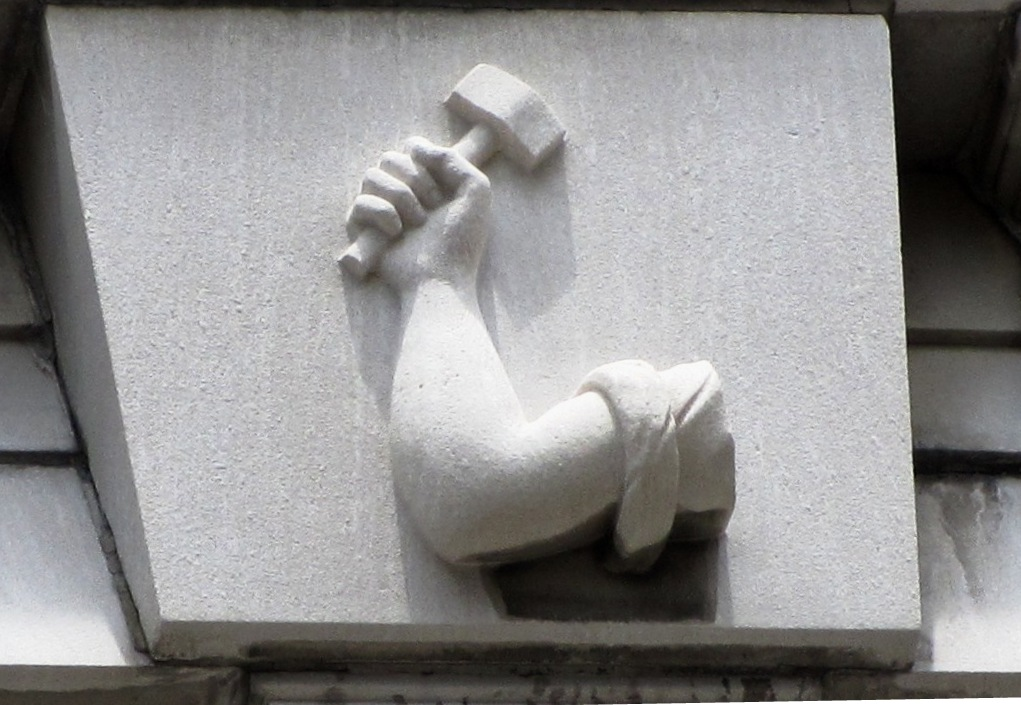
Arm-and-hammer symbol at the Mechanics' Bank and Trust Company Building in Knoxville, Tennessee

The arm and hammer is a symbol consisting of a muscular arm holding a hammer. Used in ancient times as a symbol of the god Vulcan, it came to be known as a symbol of industry, for example blacksmithing and gold-beating. It has been used as a symbol by many different kinds of organizations, including banks, local government, and socialist political parties.

It has been used in heraldry, appearing in the coat of arms of Birmingham and seal of Wisconsin.

The Arm & Hammer brand is a registered trademark of Church & Dwight, an American manufacturer of household products. According to the company, the logo originally represented Vulcan. Oilman and philanthropist Armand Hammer, who was named after the symbol by his socialist father, eventually acquired a controlling interest and joined the board of directors due to his name. He remained an owner until his death in 1990.

An arm-and-hammer sign can be seen in Manette Street, Soho, symbolizing the trade of gold-beating carried on there in the nineteenth century. It is referred to by Charles Dickens in A Tale of Two Cities. As of 2016, the sign there is a replica, with the original being held in the Dickens Museum.

One of the oldest visualizations of arm and hammer can be found on Svetitskhoveli Cathedral. It was completed in 1029 by the medieval Georgian architect Arsukidze, although the site itself dates back to the early fourth century.

== Gallery ==
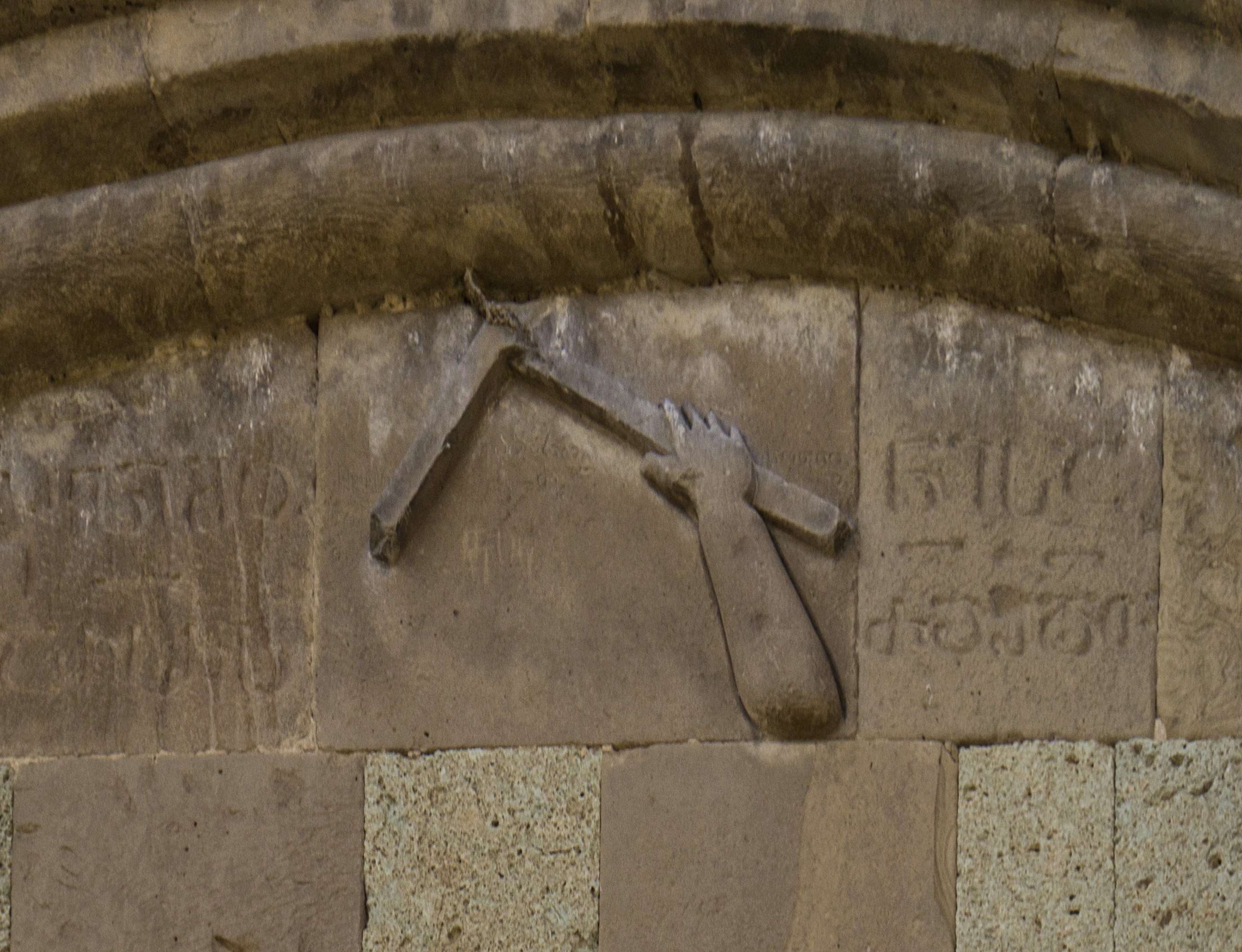
Svetitskhoveli Cathedral - The Hand of the Architect

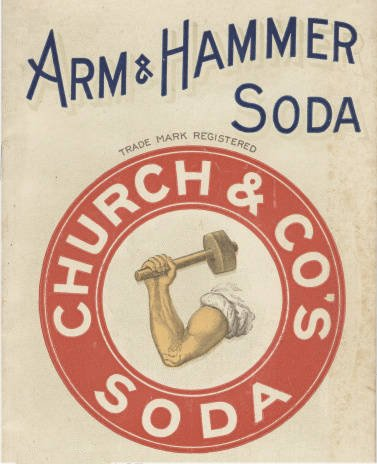
The logo of Arm & Hammer

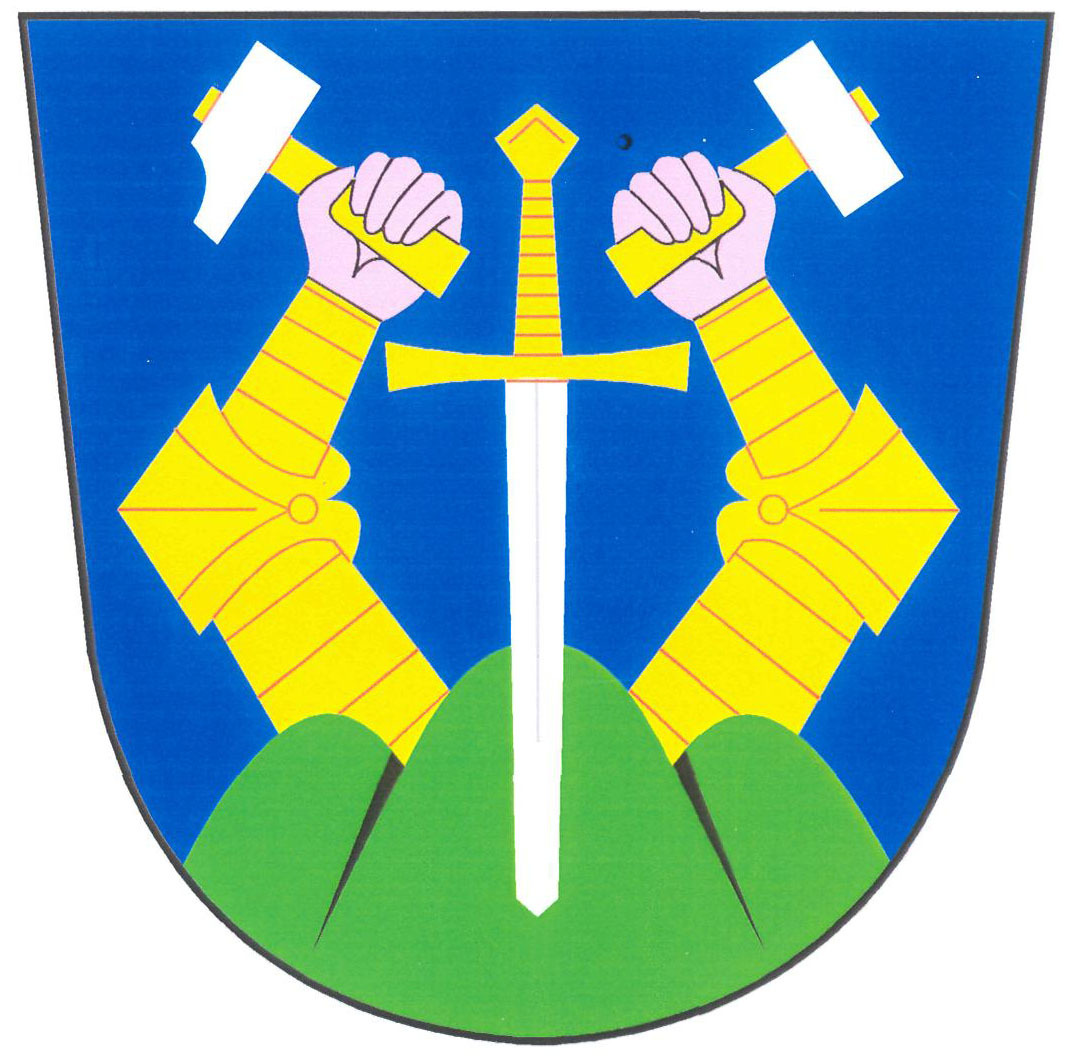
Coat of arms of Hory (Karlovy Vary District)

Coat of arms of the Hungarian Várallyay family

Coat of arms of Birmingham

Coat of arms of Wisconsin

Coat of arms of Luigi Maglione

Coat of arms of the Eskilstuna Municipality

Emblem of the Socialist Labor Party of America

Emblem of the Socialist Labour Party

Flag of Donetsk

== See also ==
- Hammer and pick
- Hammer and sickle
- Fist and rose
- Armand Hammer
- We Can Do It!
