= E. Dwight Church =

American rare book collector and philanthropist

Elihu Dwight Church (April 24, 1836 – August 30, 1908 in Westfield, Connecticut) was an American rare book collector and philanthropist.

E. Dwight's Church's father was Austin Church, the co-founder of the company that eventually became Church & Dwight, Inc., a company famous for manufacturing baking soda and other household products. E. Dwight Church and his brother eventually became the owner/managers of Church & Dwight. Upon his death at age seventy-two, E. Dwight Church was Church & Dwight's president. He was involved in several business enterprises, served in the American Civil War in the 7th New York Volunteer Infantry Regiment, and belonged to several clubs in New York City. He was a graduate of the City College of New York.

Church began collecting rare books in the late 1870s by purchasing works illustrated with Thomas Bewick's wood cuts and then acquired many examples of books illustrated by George Cruikshank. In about 1886 Church began his collection of Americana. The catalogue of Church's collection was compiled in five volumes by George Watson Cole. Of the seventeen known editions of Columbus's first letter, Church obtained six. He purchased 19 early editions of works containing the letters of Amerigo Vespucci and several rare editions of the works of the early English voyagers. Although Church's collection is chiefly noteworthy for its Americana, there are also rare editions of Shakespeare's works, including George Daniel's copy of the "Sonnets". In 1911 Henry E. Huntington's representative George D. Smith acquired for Huntington the E. Dwight Church collection of books and manuscripts.

Most notable in this collection was the original of "Franklin's Autobiography," said to be the most valuable of all American documents, with the exception of the American Declaration of Independence. The price paid for this collection was $1,250,000. It contains, in addition to the "Autobiography," some letters of Christopher Columbus and George Washington; a first edition of Milton's "Comus" and "Paradise Lost," and a first edition of Bunyan's "Pilgrim's Progress."

Church was predeceased by his first wife. Upon his death, he was survived by his widow, three children from his second marriage, and four sons from his first marriage.
