= Noxell =

Producer of Noxzema and CoverGirl

Noxell Corporation
- Industry: Cosmetics
- Founded: 1917
- Headquarters: Hunt Valley Maryland, United States
- Products: Cosmetics
- Parent: Procter & Gamble
- Website: Noxzema.com

Noxell Corporation, formerly known as the Noxzema Chemical Company, was a Maryland-based company that made household products. Its best known brands were Noxzema and CoverGirl. In 2016, it became a subsidiary of The Procter & Gamble Company.

== History ==
Francis J. Townsend, a doctor who lived in Ocean City, Maryland, created a formula which he called "Townsend R22", or "no-eczema". Townsend prescribed it as a remedy to early resort vacationers burned by the sun. In order to help people outside of the resort town Townsend later gave the formula to Dr. George Bunting, a graduate of Washington College in Maryland, who for many years denied the transaction.

In about 1917 Bunting introduced "Dr. Bunting's Sunburn Remedy" as an alternative to the greasy, tallow-based medicating creams available during the period. For the first three years, Bunting and Elizabeth Buck did all the mixing, heating, and pouring of the product themselves. The product was soon renamed Noxzema and promoted as a skin cream with a variety of uses.

In 1920 the Noxzema Chemical Company factory was opened in a house in Baltimore. The Noxzema product was promoted through radio and print advertising, and continued to achieve increasing sales throughout the United States during the 1940s.

During the 1950s, the company diversified into other personal care products, including shaving cream, cold cream, suntan lotion and suntan oil. In the late 1950s it originated the CoverGirl line of cosmetics, notable for using Noxzema's medicated ingredients. The company diversified again when it bought the Lestoil heavy-duty multipurpose cleanser product in 1960. The company changed its name to Noxell Corporation in 1966.

Noxell continued to be owned during this time by the Bunting family; Bunting's son, G. Lloyd Bunting Sr., assumed the management of the company, followed during 1973 by George L. Bunting Jr., Dr. Bunting's grandson. In 1989 the Procter & Gamble purchased the Noxell Company in 1989, as part of a $1.4 billion merger; the company continued to operate as a subsidiary.

In 1996, the company sold off the Lestoil brand to The Clorox Company, citing the need to focus on cosmetics and fragrances.

Its television commercials for Noxzema Shave Cream by the William Esty Advertising Agency caused a sensation when model Gunilla Knutson asked men to "take it off, take it all off" (referring to facial hair).

P & G sold the Noxzema brand to Alberto-Culver in October 2008. Alberto-Culver was subsequently bought by the Anglo-Dutch consumer goods company Unilever on September 27, 2010, for $US3.7 billion.

In 2016 the Noxell Company headquarters are located in a plant in the Baltimore suburb of Hunt Valley, Maryland; the facility also houses the cosmetics division of Procter & Gamble. This plant produces products for the CoverGirl, Max Factor and Olay brands, but Noxzema branded products are no longer produced there.
