= Carter's Little Liver Pills =

American patent medicine

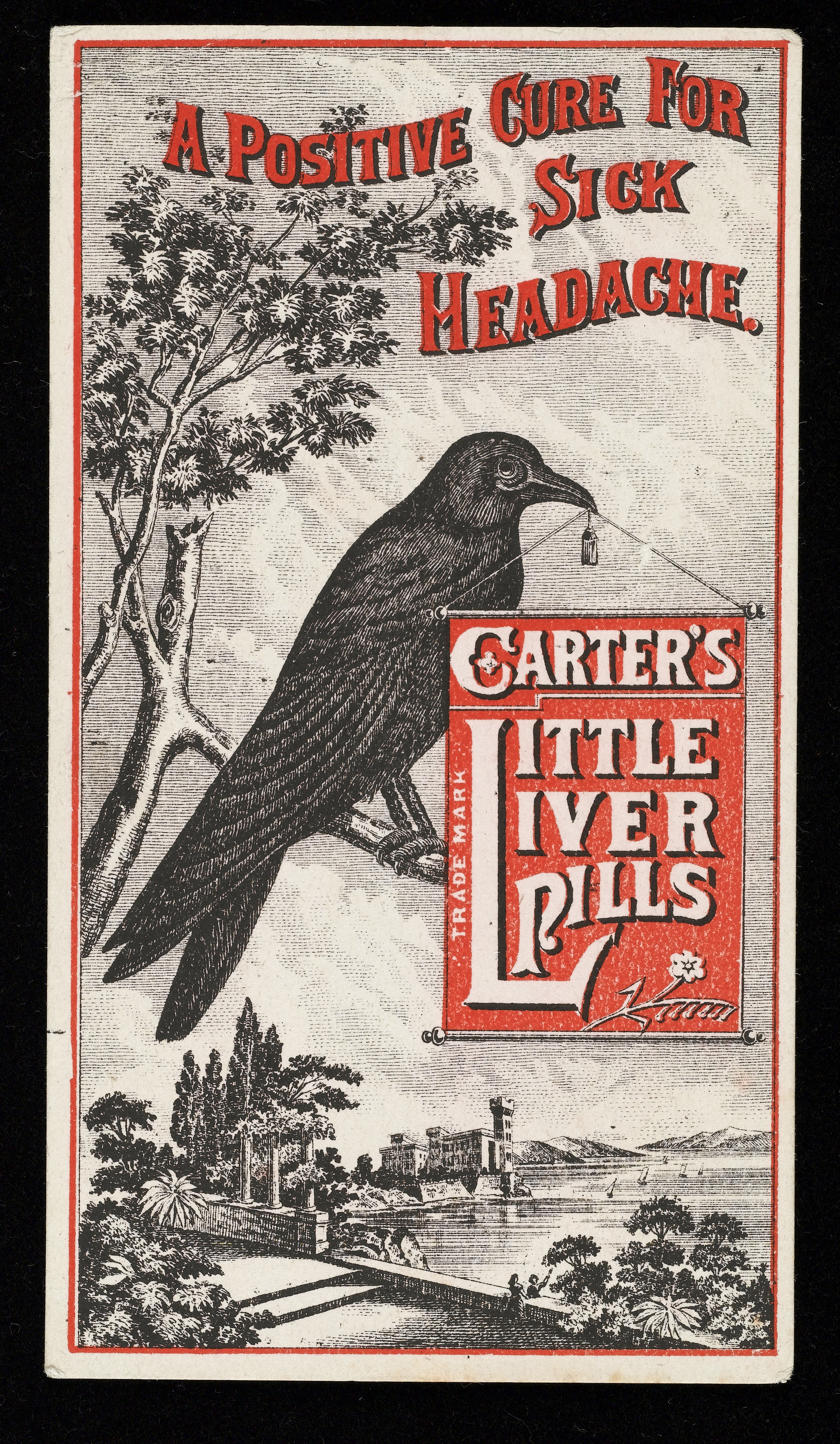
An early 20th-century advertisement for Carter's Little Liver Pills

Carter's Little Liver Pills (Carter's Little Pills after 1959) were formulated as a patent medicine by Samuel J. Carter of Erie, Pennsylvania, in 1868.

== Ingredients ==
The active ingredient was changed to the laxative bisacodyl when the product was renamed in 1959; the original active ingredients were purported to be 1/4 grain (16 mg) of aloe and 0.062 grains (4.0 mg) of podophyllum resin.

== History ==
Carter's trademark was a black crow. By 1880 the business was incorporated as Carter Products. The pills were touted to cure headache, constipation, dyspepsia, and biliousness. In the late 19th century, they were marketed in the UK by the American businessman John Morgan Richards.

Carter's Little Liver Pills predated the other available forms of bisacodyl and was a very popular and heavily advertised patent medicine up until the 1960s, spawning a common saying (with variants) in the first half of the 20th century: "He/She has more [whatever things] than Carter has Little Liver Pills". In 1951 the Federal Trade Commission required the company to change the name to "Carter's Little Pills", since "liver" in the name was deceptive.

== Legacy ==
The senator Robert Byrd, after winning re-election in 2000, is quoted as saying, "West Virginia has always had four friends, God Almighty, Sears Roebuck, Carter's Liver Pills and Robert C. Byrd."

A Carter's Little Liver Pills ad was featured in Joe Dante's 1968 collage parody film The Movie Orgy.
