= Carter-Wallace =

American personal care company

- Type: Public
- Industry: Pharmaceutical
- Founded: 1859
- Founder: John Samuel Carter
- Defunct: May 8, 2001 in Erie, Pennsylvania, United States
- Fate: Acquired by Church and Dwight and Kelso & Company
- Number of employees: 3320 (2000)

Carter-Wallace was a personal care company headquartered in New York City. The company was formed by the merger of Carter Products and Wallace Laboratories. The company had a research facility in Cranbury, New Jersey.

== History ==
The company was formed as Carter Medicine Company which was incorporated in 1880 by John Samuel Carter of Erie, Pennsylvania. John Carter died in 1884 and his son, Samuel Carter took over. John Higgins Wallace Jr., a research chemist from Princeton, New Jersey was hired and he formulated Arrid deodorant in 1935.

In 2001 the consumer product line was sold to Church and Dwight and MedPointe bought the diagnostics and drug businesses.

== CEOs ==
- John Samuel Carter (?-1884) 1880 to 1884.
- Samuel J. Carter, son of John.
- Brent Good, a New York businessman that convinced John to incorporate.
- Harry Good, son of Brent.
- Charles Orcutt, brother-in-law of Harry.
- Henry Hamilton Hoyt Sr., son-in-law of Charles; bought a controlling interest in the company.
- Henry Hamilton Hoyt Jr.

== Timeline ==
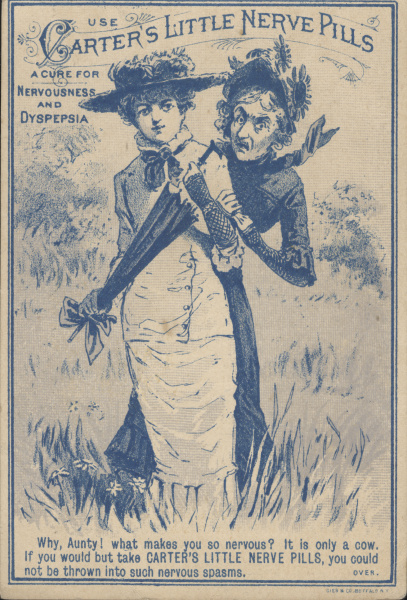
Carter Medicine Company was unrelated to Carter's Little Liver Pills.

- 1859: Carter's Little Liver Pills compounded in a four room building in Erie, Pennsylvania.
- 1880: Carter Medicine Company is incorporated.
- 1929: Henry Hamilton Hoyt Sr. becomes company's managing director.
- 1935: Arrid antiperspirant introduced.
- 1937: Carter Medicine Company becomes Carter Products.
- 1940: Nair depilatory introduced.
- 1949: Rise shaving cream, the first pressurized shave cream is introduced.
- 1961: Henry Hamilton Hoyt Jr., becomes company chairman.
- 1965: Carter Products is renamed Carter-Wallace.
- 1985: Youngs Drug Products acquired.
- 1988: Sea & Ski sold to Fabergé
- 1989: Hygeia Sciences acquired.
- 1993: Felbatol, a medication for epileptics, is launched and later withdrawn from the market.
- 1999: Trojan condom Supra, the first polyurethane condom is introduced.
- 2000: Henry Hamilton Hoyt Jr. retires.
- 2001: MedPointe buys the pharmaceutical pipeline and the Carter-Wallace name, and Church and Dwight buys the personal care brands.

== Products ==
- Arrid deodorant
- Carter's Laxative, which was originally known as Carter's Little Liver Pills and after 1959 as Carter's Little Pills.
- First Response
- Lambert Kay
- Meprobamate, marketed as Miltown
- Nair depilatory
- Pearl Drops
- Carisoprodol, marketed as Soma
- Trojan condoms
- Simeticone, marketed as Ovol
- Dimenhydrinate, marketed as Gravol
- Aluminum Hydroxide, Magnesium Hydroxide, and Simethicone, antiacid antiflatulent preparation, marketed as Diovol
- Pepsin preparation, marketed as Fermentol
