= TheraBreath (brand) =

American brand of oral care products

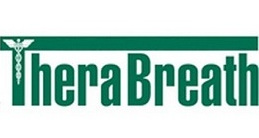
- Product type: Oral hygiene
- Current owner: Church & Dwight
- Country: United States
- Introduced: 1994; 32 years ago
- Markets: International
- Website: www.therabreath.com

TheraBreath is an American brand of oral care products that is headquartered in Los Angeles, California. The company's products treat issues related to halitosis. The company is known as The Breath Co. in the United Kingdom.

== History ==
Dentist Harold Katz embarked on research to discover the cause of bad breath in the early 90's as a result of him being unable to treat it in his own daughter. In 1994, he formed Therabreath. Its products use chlorine dioxide to treat bad breath as well as issues surrounding the tongue, throat, gum tissue, and tonsils.

In December 2021, the company was acquired by Church & Dwight for a reported amount of $580 million.
