= Austin Church =

American medical doctor

- Born: January 8, 1799; East Haddam, Connecticut, US
- Died: August 7, 1879 (aged 80); Brooklyn, New York City, US
- Occupations: Businessman, manufacturer, medical doctor
- Known for: pioneer of bicarbonate of soda

Austin Church (January 8, 1799 – August 7, 1879) was an American medical doctor and a pioneer of bicarbonate of soda manufacturing. He was a co-founder of the company that first developed the product in America from chemical compound salts. His company was the first to use the Arm & Hammer trademark to sell the product as a baking soda. He was a businessman involved with merchandising the soda product in a variety of uses from cooking and cleaning ingredients to health product supplements. As a philanthropist Church supported several charities across the United States.

== Early life ==
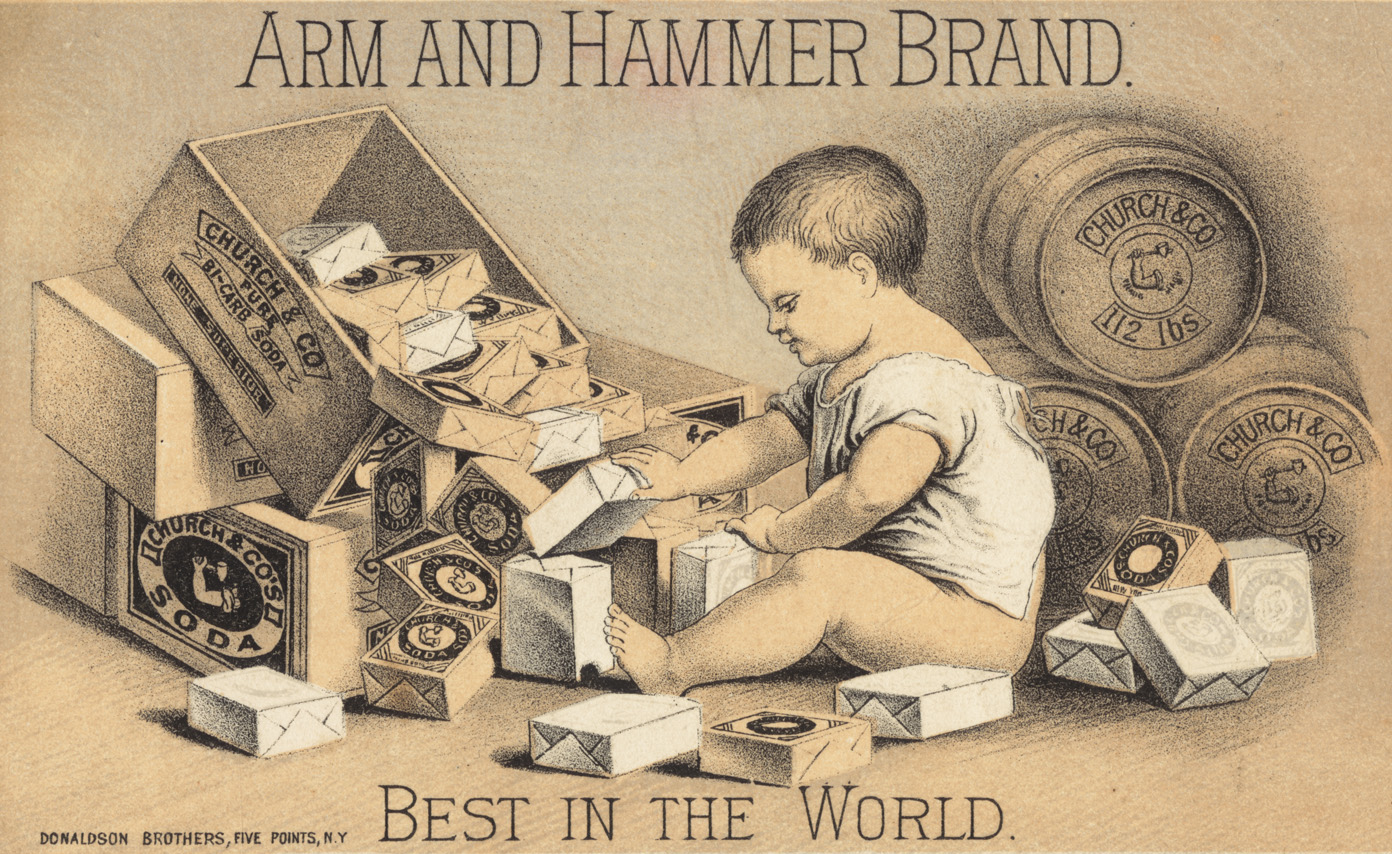
Arm & Hammer trade card from the 1870s

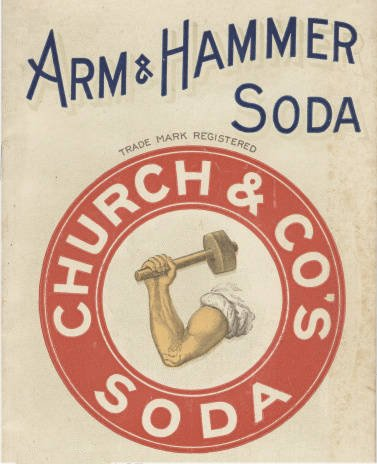
Advertisement

Church was born in East Haddam, Connecticut, on January 8, 1799. He was the son of Oliver Church, a school teacher, and Elizabeth (née Cone) Church. His mother and father died while he was still a child, leaving him an orphan with little means. However, Church was able to finish high school and put himself through Yale Medical School to become a medical doctor. He began his medical career in Utica, New York, in 1824. In 1826 he moved to and practiced in Cooperstown, New York, and in 1829 went to Ithaca, New York.

== Career ==
In 1834, Church began to experiment with sodium carbonate and carbon dioxide to try to find a yeast substitute for making bread rise while being baked. Bicarbonate of soda became a replacement for the potash then used for baking. Church gave up his medical practice and established a factory to make pearlash and saleratus in Rochester, New York. He partnered with his brother-in-law John Dwight in 1846 and started manufacturing baking soda from Dwight's farmhouse kitchen. Church and Dwight called their business John Dwight & Company and in 1847 moved to New York City, just west of 10th Avenue at 25th Street. Their product became the first commercially produced bicarbonate of soda manufactured in the United States.

Church and Dwight packaged the product themselves in one-pound (450 g) brightly colored bags for grocery store shelves. The sales increased from 1 short ton (910 kg) of production in 1846 to over 10,000 short tons (9,100,000 kg) a year thirty years later. The factory that produced the baking soda was in Brooklyn, where Church lived for twenty-five years. The main office of the company was on Front Street in Rochester, New York. In the mid-1860s, Church and Dwight showed an interest in their sons becoming partners in their company, but a recent investor in the company objected because he did not like the idea of them intruding. Church resigned from the company, and founded Church & Company of Massachusetts with his sons in 1867. They used the Arm & Hammer trademark (hammer-wielding arm of Vulcan, the Roman god of fire) from the Vulcan Spice Mills company, which was owned by one of Church's sons. They used the well recognized trademark to sell the Arm & Hammer Baking Soda product for hundreds of uses in cooking and cleaning and successfully marketed it worldwide.

Church's soda product was the same as Dwight's product, which he continued selling under the Cow Brand trademark. Church and Dwight remained friends and competed for 29 years. The two firms were joined again in 1896 by the descendants of the founders and became the Church & Dwight Company. The Cow Brand and Arm & Hammer Brand were seen by the public as one and the same, so both logos were used after the merger. For example, they gave away recipe books with both trademarks on the cover. For fifty years, the company was one of the most well-known grocery store supply vendors in the United States. Dwight was the first president of Church and Dwight Company and kept this position until his death in 1903. Arm & Hammer's sales of their product had increased 25 percent a year from 1970 through 1995. There were 300 industrial uses for the soda product in North America by 1995, some of which were for environmental purposes.

== Philanthropy ==
Church was known as a generous contributor to various charities in Brooklyn, one being the New York Association for Improvement of the Poor.

== Family ==
On May 3, 1827, Church married Nancy Dwight; she was the daughter of Elihu Dwight, a physician of South Hadley, Massachusetts. They had two sons and two daughters. Nancy was the older sibling to Church's business partner John Dwight.

== Later life and death ==
Church retired from the bicarbonate of soda manufacturing business in 1876. He lived to celebrate his golden wedding anniversary in 1877. Church died in Brooklyn, New York, on August 7, 1879. His two sons, E. Dwight Church and James Austin Church, managed Church and Dwight Company after his death.

== Sources ==
- Grant, Tina (February 1, 2005). Directory of Company Histories. St. James Press. ISBN 978-1-55862-543-3.
- Hall, Henry (1895). America's Successful Men... New York tribune. p. 141. OCLC 866423166.
- Herringshaw, Thomas William (1904). Herringshaw's Encyclopedia... American Publishers' Association. OCLC 844003736.
- Jorgensen, Janice (1994). Encyclopedia of Consumer Brands. Saint James Press. ISBN 978-1-55862-336-1.
- Rice, Randall Peter (1994). Beyond The Bottom Line... Randall Peter Rice. "The Arm & Hammer trademark came from another Church family business, Vulcan Spice Mills."
- White, James T. (1935). Austin Church. James T. White & Company, Volume 24.
- Williams, Robert Jr and Helena (April 21, 2017). Vintage Marketing. Palgrave Macmillan US. ISBN 978-1-137-38721-9. "John R. Maurice, who was a recent investor in the company, objected to the son's intrusion, so Church eventually resigned from the company."
- Yale University (1859). Yale University. Yale University. OCLC 883798902.
