= Nair (hair removal) =

Hair removal product manufactured by Church & Dwight

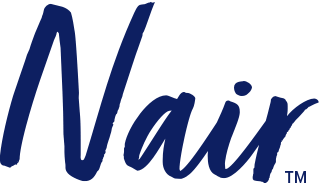
- Current owner: Church & Dwight
- Markets: United States

Nair is a hair-removal product manufactured by Church & Dwight.

Nair is a portmanteau of "No hair". It uses depilatories that work by breaking the disulfide bonds of the keratin molecules in hair. The original Nair lotion was introduced in 1940.

The initial ad for a TV campaign with the slogan "We wear short shorts, Nair for short shorts" won a Clio. It was based on the 1958 song "Short Shorts".

Nair was purchased from Carter-Wallace in 2001 via a partnership with Kelso. Also in 2001, Nair introduced its line of men's products.

As of 2007, Nair had 25 products ranging from hair removal waxes to bleaches.

== Active ingredients ==
Calcium hydroxide is an active ingredient that chemically breaks down the hair for removal. Some formulations also contain potassium thioglycolate, which breaks down the disulfide bonds in the hair's keratin. The products often include softening agents, such as mineral oil, to help offset the harsh active ingredients.
