= Product lining =

Marketing strategy of offering several related products for sale simultaneously

In marketing jargon, product lining refers to the offering of several related products for individual sale. Unlike product bundling, where several products are combined into one group, which is then offered for sale as a units, product lining involves offering the products for sale separately. A line can comprise related products of various sizes, types, colors, qualities, or prices. Line depth refers to the number of subcategories under a category. Line consistency refers to how closely related the products that make up the line are. Line vulnerability refers to the percentage of sales or profits that are derived from only a few products in the line.

In comparison to product bundling, which is a strategy of offering more than one product for promotion as one combined item to create differentiation and greater value, product lining consists of selling different related products individually. The products in the product line can come in various sizes, colours, qualities or prices. For instance, the variety of coffees that are offered at a café is one of its product lines and it could consist of flat white, cappuccinos, short black, lattes, mochas, etc. Alternatively, product line of juices and pastries can also be found at a café. The benefits from having a successful product line is the brand identification from customers which result in customer loyalty and multiple purchases. It increases the likelihood of customers purchasing new products from the company that have just been added into the product line due to the previous satisfying purchases.

== Product mix ==
In marketing, the number of product lines offered is referred to as the width of product mix. Product mix, also known as product assortment, is the total number of variety of products that a firm sells to their customers. It measures the total number of product lines. Some companies will focus solely and sell only one type of product that they specialise in. Also, some would offer numerous types of products for diversified markets, depending on the size and objectives of the entities. Each approaches' results vary based on many factors including location, market, trends, etc. Therefore, businesses should carefully consider their product mix. The width of product mix is one of the four dimensions of product mix along with the length, depth and consistency of product mix.

=== Width ===
As mentioned above, the width of product mix is referred to as the total number of product lines that the company offers. A diversified product mix can target the maximum number of customers, however, such numbers of product lines requires much attention and focus as each product line targets different groups of consumers and involves individual strategy and management. Although specialisation of products (narrow product mix) might be easier for businesses to operate and manage, it reduces the ability to reach out to diverse markets as they fail to offer sufficient options for consumers to cater to their "needs and wants."

=== Length ===
The length of product mix refers to the total number of products sold by a company. A product line consists of many similar products defined by its functions and customer market while short product line consists of fewer related products. Customer satisfaction could be achieved through longer product lines. However, overly dense product lines may result in competition within the same line and lead to loss of revenue and customers. If product lines are too short, consumer options are limited, forcing them to switch to competitors with a longer range of products.

=== Depth ===
The depth of product mix pertains to the total number of variations of product in a product line. For example, a brand would be considered to have a depth of four if it sells two sizes and two flavours of soda.

=== Consistency ===
The consistency of product mix refers to how closely associated the products in the same product line are to each other, in terms of their use, production and distribution. A business’ production mix could be very consistent in distribution, yet extremely different in other areas such as use. For instance, a company may be selling health related items such as multi-vitamins tablet and magazines. Although both products fit into the same product line, they are completely dissimilar in use while one is editable and the other is not.

== Product line extension and product line stretching ==
When companies add a new item to a product line, it is referred to as the product line extension. The purpose of it is to attract new customers who may not be familiar or satisfied with the current standard product line. For example, when a lifestyle pharmacy decided to add in a high protein muesli bar into its current product line of muesli bar. Companies with an effective product line can employ product line extension in order to reach new demographic customers in different geographic areas.

When a business adds a line extension to the product line and if it is of a higher quality than the current products, it is considered as trading up or an upward stretch. Alternatively, if the new added item is of lower quality compared to other existing products, it is known as trading down or a downward stretch. These stretches are known as product line stretching. Supermarkets often apply product line stretching to their product lines by offering different grading of their own brand products to ensure all markets are covered for maximum interest from customers. In addition, when companies add new varieties of existing products it is known as product line filling.

== Product line pricing ==
Product line pricing is a product pricing strategy, used when a company has more than one product in a product line. It is a process that traders adopt to separate products in the same category into various price groups, to create different quality levels in the customers’ minds.

For instance, vehicle manufacturers produce their vehicles in different models including economy models, environmental models, luxury models and more. Each of them has an individual cost or price to display the difference in levels. With that being said, for any pricing techniques to be effective, demand elasticity, the whole product mix, product positioning strategy and the product life cycle have to be put into consideration to determine the best price for each product.

=== Price lining ===
Price lining is a method of pricing different products for a limited number of prices. This strategy allows ease of administering and companies are able to predict their markets of customers and profits much easier. Dollar Store is an excellent example of price lining as most products sold there are $1.

=== Captive pricing ===
Captive pricing is a strategy drawing consumers’ interests and encouraging purchases by offering a basic product for a really low price, however, they will have to purchase additional items in order to obtain the full value of the product they have received. Although the retailer might lose profit on the first sales item, they will manage to gain it back from the additional products that customers buy. For example, razor blades and razor manufacturers usually sell razor handles for an unbeatable price while selling additional blade cartridges at a much higher price. Captive pricing is most effective when there are no other similar products from competitors in the same price range.

=== Bundled pricing ===
Bundled pricing is the approach of selling products and their accessories or other options as one product for one price. Consumers will not need to purchase each item separately but one bundled item and priced as one product. This would also be appealing to customers as normally they would be on sale and have the original price still tagged on the product to emphasize the price difference. For instance, retailers will offer a bundle deal for purchasing a new computer with its accessories, such as keyboard and mouse pad.

=== Bait pricing ===
Bait Pricing, also known as "Bait and Switch", is often considered unethical and sometimes illegal. It involves promoting items at a really low price to entice customers, with only limited supplies. Customers will come into the store looking for the advertised product and find out is out of stock or does not even exist, and afterward be encouraged to purchase a comparable, higher-priced product that is available in store.

=== Leader pricing ===
Similar to Bait pricing, retailers use leader pricing to entice customers to come into the stores by advertising items, the loss leaders, at a low price. When they arrive at the stores aiming for the promoted products, they often end up buying additional products at their full prices. Therefore, businesses earn their profit off of the unplanned buying decisions by customers besides the loss leaders.

== Related jargon ==
The number of different categories of a company is referred to as width of product mix. The total number of products sold in all lines is referred to as length of product mix. If a line of products is sold with the same brand name, this is referred to as family branding. When you add a new product to a line, it is referred to as a line extension. When you have a single saleable item distinguishable by size, appearance, price or some other attribute in your product line, it is called SKU-Stock Keeping Unit.

The marketing jargon for adding a product that is better quality than other products in the line is trading up or brand leveraging or up-market stretch. A line extension of lower quality is called trading down or down-market stretch. Trading down may reduce your brand equity by gaining short-term sales at the expense of long term sales. The jargon for "stretching the line" in both the directions is "two-way stretch".

Image anchors are highly promoted products within a line that define the image of the whole line. Image anchors are usually from the higher end of the line's range. When you add a new product within the current range of an incomplete line, this is referred to as line filling.

Price lining is the use of a limited number of prices for all your product offerings. This is a tradition started in the old five and dime stores in which everything cost either 5 or 10 cents. Its underlying rationale is that these amounts are seen as suitable price points for a whole range of products by prospective customers. It has the advantage of ease of administering, but the disadvantage of inflexibility, particularly in times of inflation or unstable prices.

== See also ==
- Brand
- Brand management
- Halo effect
- Marketing
- Product management
- Product line extensions
