= Trojan (brand) =

American brand of condoms and sexual lubricants

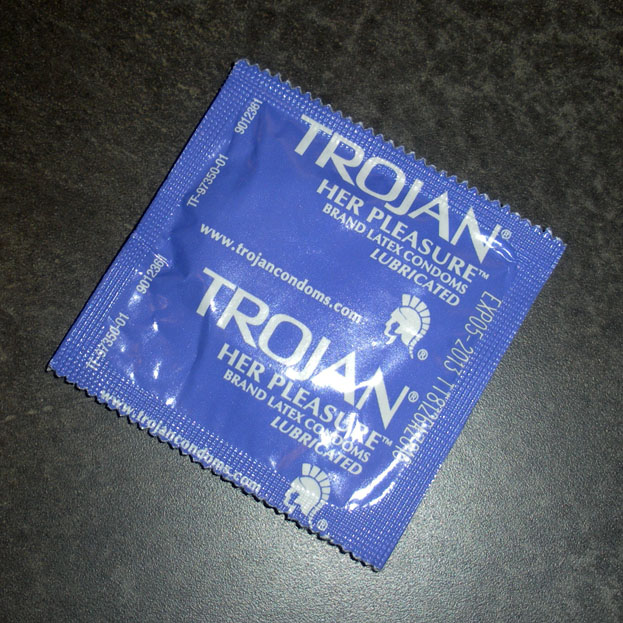
- Current owner: Church & Dwight Company
- Country: United States
- Introduced: 1916; 110 years ago
- Previous owners: Fay and Youngs (1916); Youngs Drug Products (1919); Carter-Wallace (1985); Church & Dwight (2001)
- Tagline: Trojan. Pleasure you want. Protection you trust.
- Website: trojanbrands.com

Trojan is an American brand name of condoms and sexual lubricants manufactured by the Church & Dwight Company. Trojan condoms were started by Merle Leland Youngs in the 1910s after he moved to New York City. The major condom manufacturer before Youngs was Julius Schmid, who had made condoms from animal intestines starting in the 1880s.

As of 2006, 70.5% of condoms purchased in United States drugstores are Trojan brand.

== Brand history ==
Trojan condoms were first manufactured in 1916 by Merle Leland Youngs through his company Fay and Youngs, renamed Youngs Rubber Corporation in 1919. Youngs Rubber Corporation debuted Trojan brand condoms with the image of the Trojan helmet. Trojan began advertising condoms in 1927 through an ad placed in a trade magazine for pharmacists.

By 1930 latex-based materials were used. Latex was less expensive than the rubber used previously, while still providing protection against disease and pregnancy. The material change also allowed a shelf life of five years in comparison to three months. As of 2009, Trojan produces 30 different varieties of condoms.

Unlike other brands, Trojan manufactures some of its condoms in the United States. Church and Dwight has a factory located at 1851 Touchstone Dr, South Chesterfield, VA. The facility was built in 1988 by the Safetex Corp. to manufacture Saxon condoms. In the mid-1990s, Trojan, then owned by Carter-Wallace, sought a new manufacturing facility. Safetex announced the closure of its Chesterfield factory. Carter-Wallace purchased and modernized the factory in 1995, expanding it to more than three times its original size.

In May of 2023, Church and Dwight announced a $27-million expansion to its Chesterfield manufacturing plant, where they plan to produce an innovative scent-boosting laundry product.

== Research ==
Since 2006, Trojan has conducted the Sexual Health Report Card, an annual ranking of the sexual health resources available to students at college and university campuses throughout the United States. Student health centers at 141 schools from the various Bowl Championship Series conferences are ranked on the students' opinion of subjects such as their health center, condom and other contraceptive availability, HIV and STD testing, student peer groups, sexual assault programs and resources, and website usability. Research firm Sperling's BestPlaces collates and analyzes the data. During the last report in 2016, University of Georgia ranked among the best, with St. John's University in last place. The results caused a great deal of controversy. School administrators insisted that students must adhere to Roman Catholic teachings, which emphasize Natural family planning.

== Notable marketing campaigns ==
In 2003, in order to introduce Trojan condoms in the United Kingdom, a humorous fake official web site for the so-called Trojan Games was created. The Trojan Games were supposedly an international sporting event similar to the Olympics and taking place in Bucharest. The sports were based on sexual performance. As of November 2006 the various "Trojan Games" videos had been viewed 300 million times.

Trojan Vibrations gave away a total of 7,000 free vibrators in New York City and Washington, DC, in 2012.

By August 2018 a new ad campaign called "Big Sexy World" introduced a new mascot, the Trojan Man. This stirred up controversy. Many people received the ads as "too inappropriate".

A podcast hosted by Cody Ko called The Pleasure Is Ours – sponsored by Trojan and produced by iHeartRadio premiered on October 1, 2020, featuring YouTuber Drew Gooden. In each episode, Ko "invites a special guest on board to act as the older brothers (or sister) you never had, picking apart the dumbest notions that a young man or woman might be exposed to as they come of age, with topics ranging from work, to sex, to entertainment, to social media."
