= Arm & Hammer =

American brand of baking soda-based products

- Product type: Baking soda products
- Current owner: Church & Dwight
- Country: United States
- Introduced: 1846; 180 years ago
- Markets: World
- Tagline: The standard of purity
- Website: www.armandhammer.com

Arm & Hammer is a brand of baking soda–based consumer products marketed by Church & Dwight, a major American manufacturer of household products. The logo of the brand depicts the ancient symbol of a muscular arm holding a hammer inside a red circle with the brand name and slogan. Originally associated solely with baking soda and washing soda, the company began to expand the brand to other products in the late 1970s by using baking soda as a deodorizing ingredient. The new products included toothpaste, laundry detergent, underarm deodorant, and cat litter.

== History ==
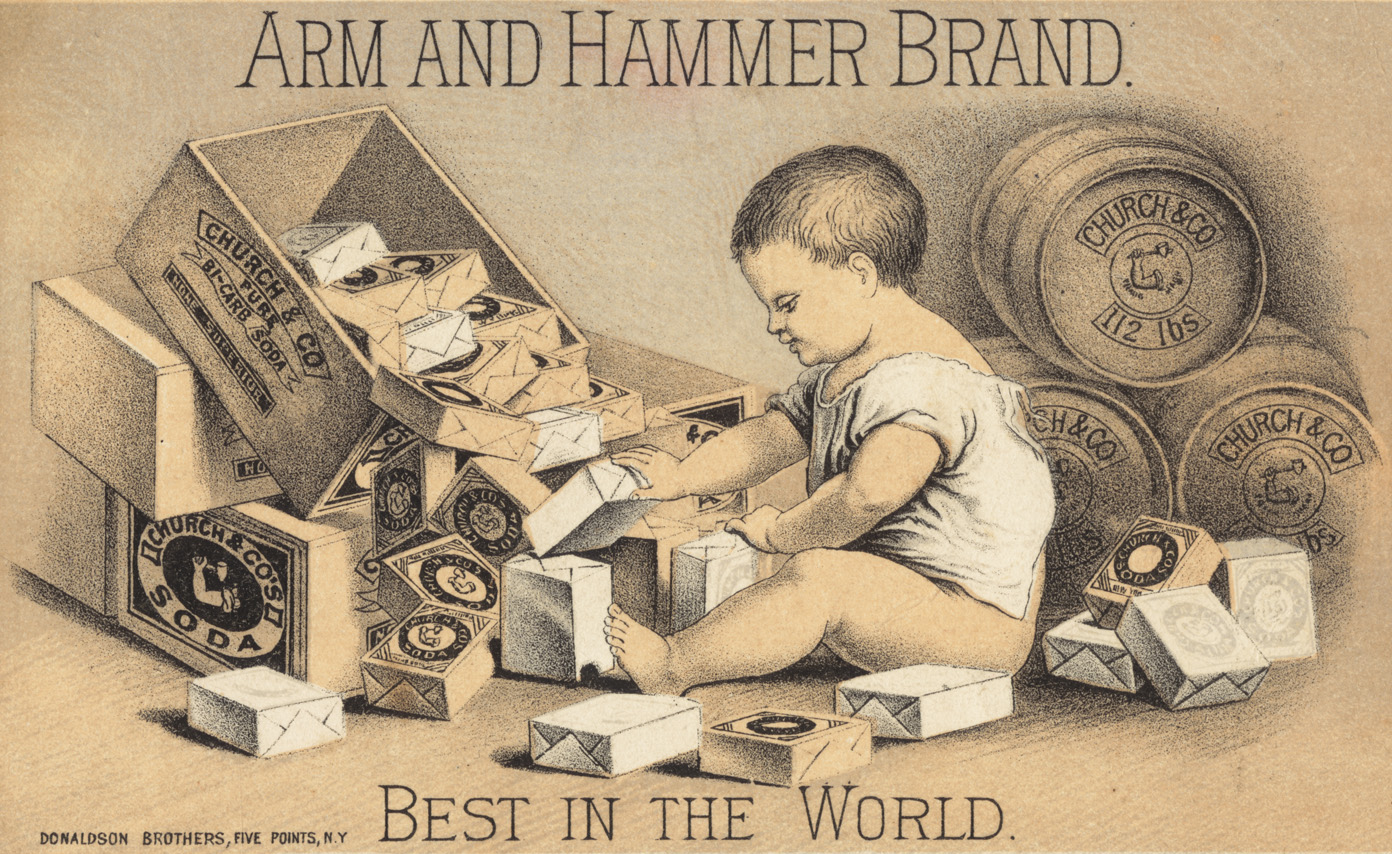
Arm and Hammer trade card from the 1870s, showing the logo

=== Name and logo ===
The original arm and hammer logo usage dates back to the 1860s. James A. Church, son of Dr. Austin Church, ran a spice business known as Vulcan Spice Mills. According to the company, the Arm and Hammer logo represents Vulcan, the Roman god of fire and metalworking.

It is often claimed that the brand name originated with tycoon Armand Hammer; however, the Arm & Hammer brand was in use 31 years before Hammer was born. Hammer was often asked about the Church & Dwight brand when he attempted to buy the company. While his attempt was unsuccessful, Hammer's Occidental Petroleum acquired enough stock for him to join the Church & Dwight board of directors in 1986. Hammer remained one of the owners of Arm & Hammer until his death in 1990.

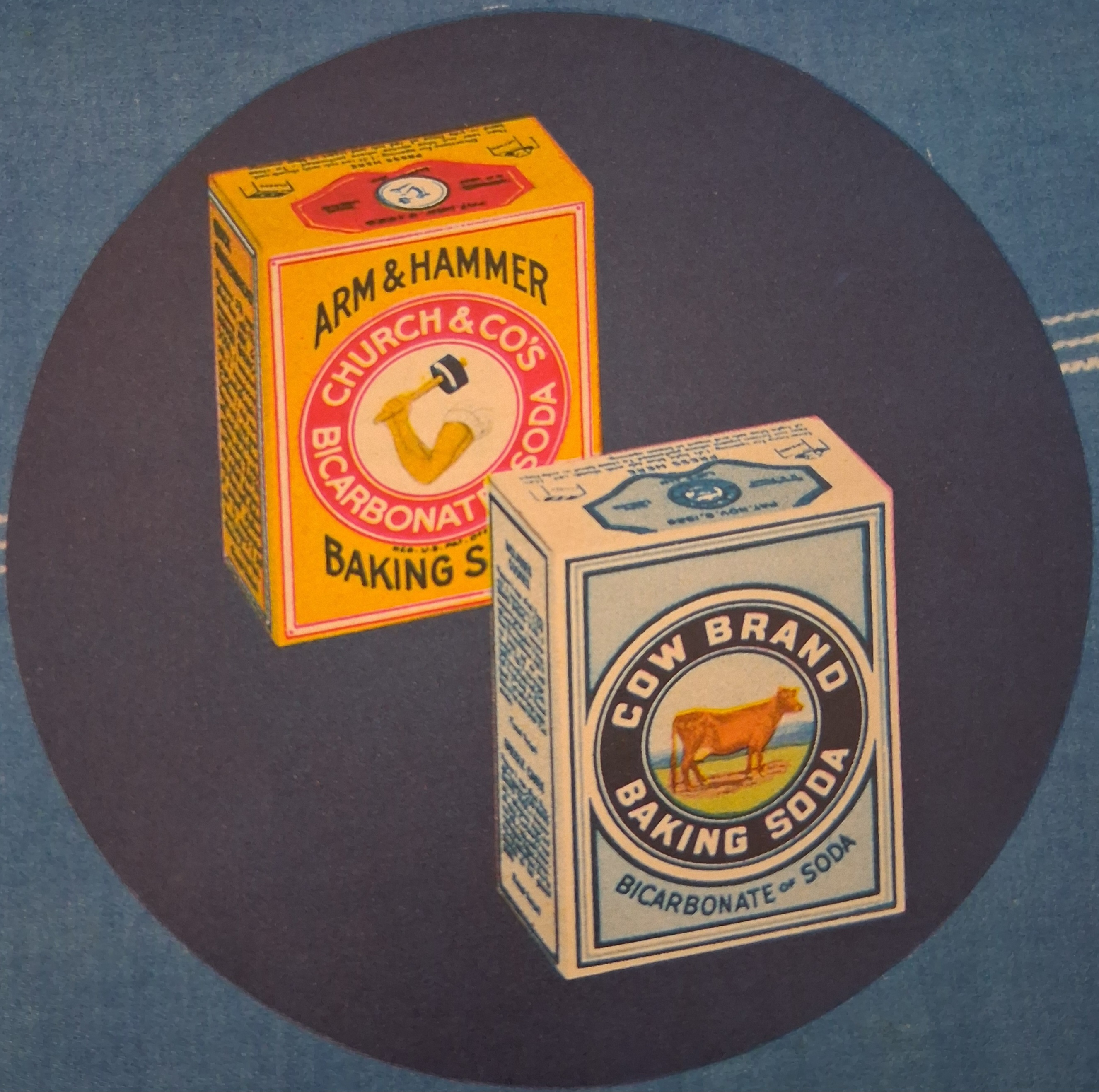
Arm & Hammer and Cow Brand logos, c. 1938

=== Baking soda ===
Arm and Hammer started as John Dwight and Company in 1846 when John Dwight and Austin Church used their sodium bicarbonate in their kitchen. They formerly made the Cow Brand trademark on their baking soda. In 1886, Austin retired and his two sons succeeded in selling Arm and Hammer Baking Soda through their name Church and Co as a competing company to the John Dwight Company which continued selling Cow Brand baking soda. The Church & Dwight Company was formed when the two were merged.

=== Odor control ===
In 1972, Arm & Hammer launched an advertising campaign promoting the idea that a box of baking soda in the refrigerator could control odors. The campaign is considered a classic of marketing, leading within a year to more than half of American refrigerators containing a box of baking soda. This claim has often been repeated since then. However, there is little evidence that it is effective in this application. Arm & Hammer further claims that the box must be replaced monthly.

== Armex ==
In 1986, Arm & Hammer created the Armex brand, a line of soda blasting agents originally used to aid in the conservation-restoration of the Statue of Liberty.

== Gallery ==
=== Industry trade cards ===
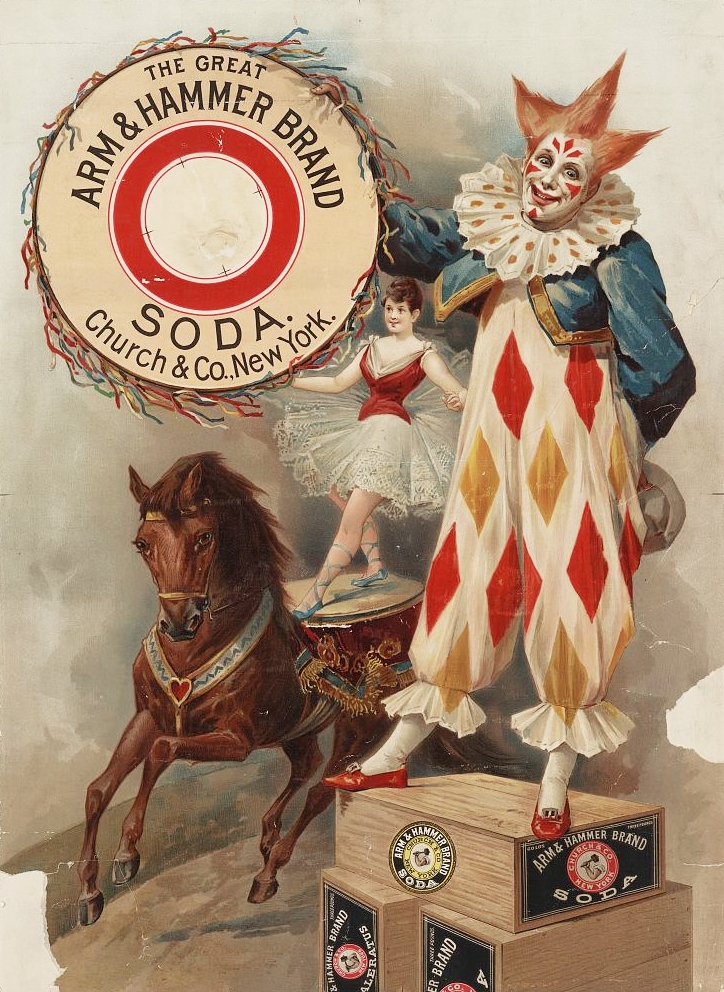
ca. 1900

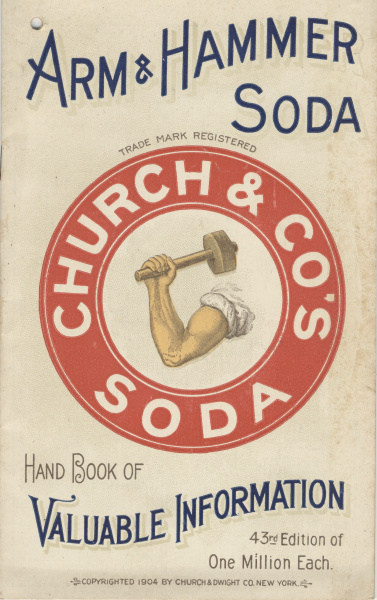
ca. 1904

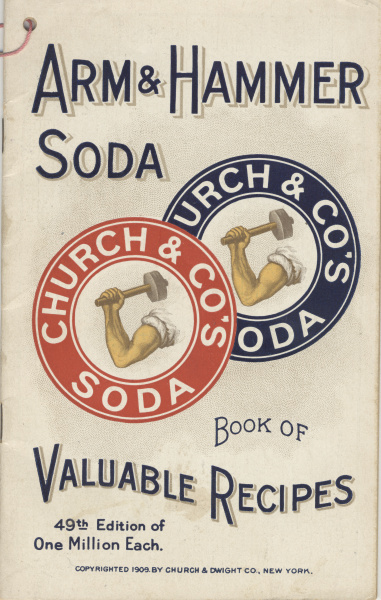
ca. 1908

== See also ==
- List of toothpaste brands
