= Henry Hoyt (bookseller) =

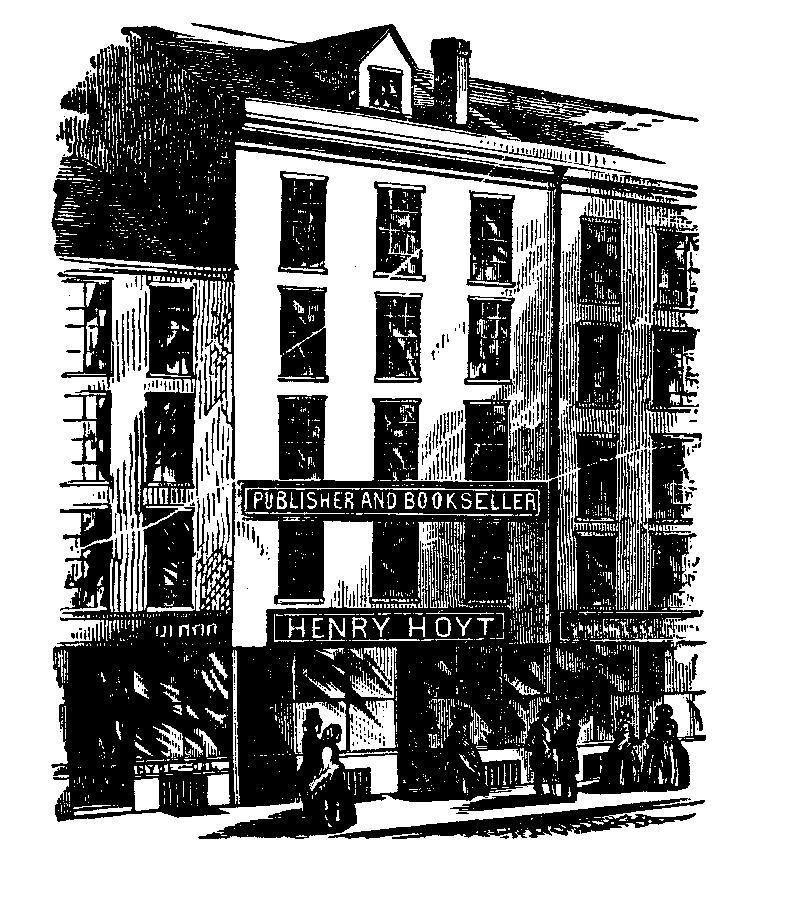
Storefront of Henry Hoyt at No. 9 Cornhill, Boston in 1870.

Henry Hoyt was a publisher and bookseller at No. 9 Cornhill, Boston, Massachusetts, United States, active from 1850 until 1876. He specialized in juvenile and popular religious works, such as the Sunday School Journal and the Child's Companion and Youth's Friend. The firm was eventually succeeded at the same location by Ira Bradley & Co., which became Bradley & Woodruff.
