= Henry Hamilton Hoyt Sr. =

Henry Hamilton Hoyt Sr. (June 28, 1895 – November 5, 1990) was the president of Carter products division of Carter-Wallace starting in 1965.

== Biography ==
He was born on June 28, 1895. He had a son, Henry Hamilton Hoyt Jr.

He died on November 5, 1990.
