= Rise shaving cream =

First shaving cream sold in an aerosol can

Rise shaving cream, introduced by Carter-Wallace in 1949, was the first shaving cream to be sold in an aerosol can. In 1963 the Federal Trade Commission charged Carter-Wallace with false advertising when a television commercial for Rise used "a phony substance resembling shaving cream."
