= Gunilla Knutsson =

Swedish model, actress and author (1940–2025)

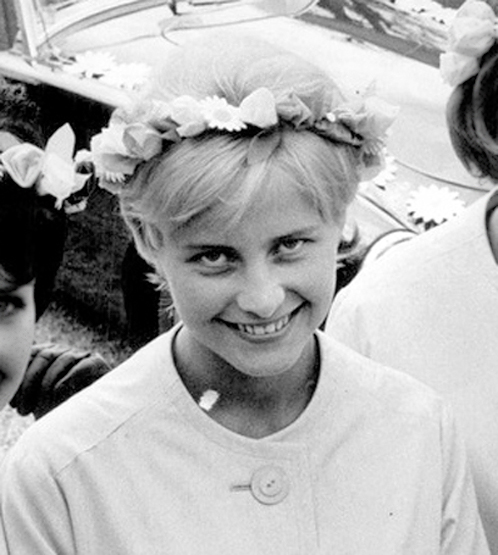
Knutsson in 1961

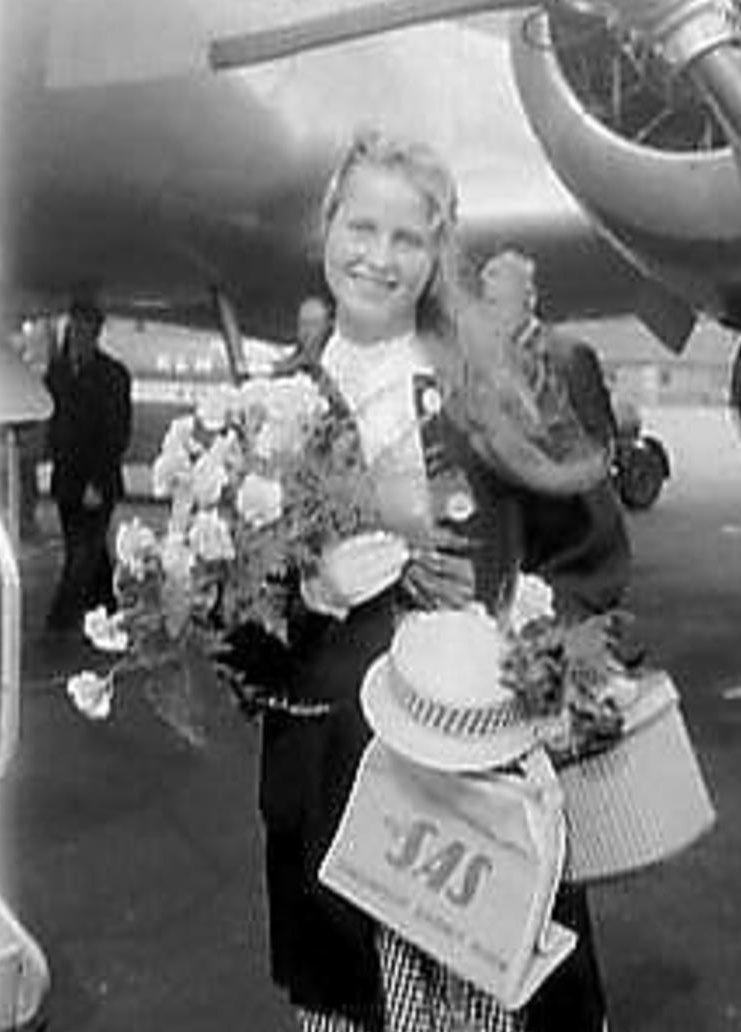
Knutsson in 1957

Gunilla Knutsson (Note: alternatively spelled Knutson, Knudson, or Knudsen) (14 November 1940 – 3 February 2025) was a Swedish actress, model, author and beauty pageant titleholder who was crowned Miss Sweden 1961 and was a semi-finalist in the Miss Universe 1961 pageant.

== Life and career ==
Knutsson is most famous for a series of Noxzema medicated shaving cream commercials from 1967 to 1973, in which she urged men to "take it off, take it all off" (referring to facial hair). During 1973, she appeared with Joe Namath in such a commercial when he was the star quarterback for the New York Jets American football team. Knutsson later became the spokesperson and vice-president of sales for Rose Milk Skin Care Lotion.

A photograph of Knutsson appeared on the cover of the 11 December 1970 issue of Life magazine. This issue of Life, with the caption "Model Gunilla Knutson owns a health food store", featured a three-page article entitled "The Move To Eat Natural" with a photo of Knutsson at her store Nature's Children, of which she was part owner. Another photo of her appeared on the October 1972 cover of RC Modeler magazine in front of a radio-control model of a Bell Jet Ranger helicopter, designed by Len Sabato.

In 1979, The Beaver County Times issued an article, "The Gunilla Knutsson Saga", in which she spoke about her everyday life as an executive married woman.

In the 1990s, she worked as a wine taster for Sabrina Wine Importers and a gymnastic instructor at the Buckley Elementary School in Manhattan.

Knutsson was married to Per von Scheele for over 50 years together with whom she had a son, Andreas von Scheele. She died in Ystad, Sweden on 3 February 2025, at the age of 84.

== Selected works ==
- Beauty and Health the Scandinavian Way (New York: Hawthorn Books, 1969)
- Gunilla Knutson's Book of Massage (St. Martin's Press, 1972)
