= Product line extension =

Use of an established product brand name for a new item in the same product category

A product line extension is the use of an established product brand name for a new item in the same product category.

== Overview ==
Line extensions occur when a company introduces new items in the same product category under an established brand name. These products might adjust the original with new flavors, forms, colors, added ingredients, or different package sizes. This is done to satisfy a refined segment in the market.

This differs to brand extension, in which an established brand name is used for a new product in a different product category.

=== Types of line extensions ===
There are two types of product line extensions, horizontal and vertical.

Horizontal extensions consist of keeping the price and quality the same, but altering factors like flavour or colour to differentiate the products.

Vertical extensions consist of increasing and decreasing the quality and price to create inferior and luxury goods. These product line extensions are often closely related to existing products in a brands portfolio. Brands are able to target specific consumers through this approach.

=== Pros of line extensions ===
If applied appropriately product line extensions can help companies identify and tend to the needs of target markets.

Product line extension gives consumers greater choice.

Line extension is typically relatively simple, as the company likely has the appropriate production process available for the new product, as it closely resembles a current offering.

Offering new products can keep consumers interested, which can help in avoiding customer base loss.

=== Cons of line extensions ===
Offering line extensions requires a company to invest in the new product.

A new product can confuse a company's customer base, negatively affecting the loyalty they have for the brand. This can damage brand image long term, as consumers may have a new view of the brand as cheap, in the case of downward extension, or unrealistic and unreasonable, in the case of upward extension.

Line extension can also result in the production process becoming more complicated with new products. This could affect the efficiency and quality in production of the entire product range.

== Downward extension ==
A company positioned in the middle market may want to introduce a lower-priced line for any of the 3 reasons

1. The company may notice strong growth opportunities as mass retailers such as Wal-Mart, Best Buy, and others attract a growing number of shoppers who want value-priced goods.
2. The company may wish to tie up lower-end competitors who might otherwise try to move up-market. If the company has been attacked by a low-end competitor, it often decides to counterattack by entering the low end of the market.
3. The company may find that the middle market is stagnating or declining.

Downward product line extension can create more competition between brands. This can be good for the consumer as the market may become more competitive, and goods cheaper to purchase. The extending brand may be able to leverage existing offerings to gain more market share over their competitors.

Downward product line extension can make a brand seem less luxurious, cheap, basic, and inconsistent. Consumers have reported feeling that brands which extend downwards are dishonest and untrustworthy, as they have breached the higher standards they became known for.

This happens as when extending the product line downward, the new product or products become more available to consumers and likely, cheaper. This can create a less-luxurious image of the brand by consumers.

This might work a brand widely known for its low prices and availability. Whereas, if a luxury brand were to start selling a downward product line of low-quality, low-priced goods this would negatively impact the brand's high status, exclusivity and luxurious image.

Additionally, consumers may be opted to by the cheaper option the brand is providing rather than their upward line extension goods. Thus, the introduction of a cheaper alternative may negatively affect the sales of a companies premium and more luxury goods. So, while demand and increased market share may be a positive to downward line extensions, the approach may disadvantage the brands overall profit.

== Upward extension ==
Companies may wish to enter the high-end sectors for more growth, target returning customers, higher margins, or simply to position themselves as full-line manufacturers. Many markets have spawned surprising upscale segments: Starbucks in coffee, Häagen-Dazs in ice cream and Evian in bottled water. Another examples of upward extensions are Japanese auto companies, which introduced an upscale automobile: Toyota's Lexus, Nissan's Infiniti, and Honda's Acura. These brands used new names rather than incorporating their parent company names.

Brands extending their product lines upward successfully can benefit through middle-class consumers that are able and willing to invest their money in luxury products. Brands can adjust pricing to coincide with trends within the economy, to ensure the luxury goods do not lose too much of their consumer demand within their most popular market segments.

Upward product line extension can boost the prestige the brand as a whole, through associating the new luxury product addition with the existing brand name.

However, cheaper products may draw attention and demand away from a brand's upward product line extension. Some brands combat this by increasing the quality of the brands luxury goods, as well as targeting aspects of the consumer market that are able and prepared to pay more for the higher quality product.

== Two-way stretch ==
Companies serving the middle market might decide to stretch their line in both directions. Texas Instruments (TI) introduced its first calculators in the medium-price-medium-quality section of the market. Gradually, it added calculators at the lower end taking the share from Bowmar, and at the higher end to compete with Hewlett-Packard. This two-way stretch won Texas Instruments (TI) an early market leadership in the hand-calculator market.

Examples include

- Zen LXI, Zen VXI
- Surf, Surf Excel, Surf Excel Blue
- Splendour, Splendour Plus
- Coca-Cola, Diet Coke, Vanilla Coke
- Clinic All Clear, Clinic Plus
- Reese's Peanut Butter Cups, Reese's Pieces and Reese's Puff Cereal

== See also ==
- Brand
- Brand management
- Marketing
- Product management
- Product lining
- Diffusion line
