= Church & Dwight =

American consumer goods company

Church & Dwight Co., Inc.
- Type: Public
- Traded as: NYSE: CHD; S&P 500 component
- Industry: Consumer packaged goods
- Founded: 1847: as John Dwight and Company; 1896: as Church & Dwight, Co.
- Founders: Austin Church; John Dwight
- Headquarters: Ewing Township, New Jersey, U.S.
- Area served: Worldwide
- Key people: Richard Dierker (CEO)
- Products: Household and cleaning products; Laundry products; Oral-care products; Personal-care products; Reproductive-health products; Sodium bicarbonate and specialty products
- Revenue: ▲US$6.20 billion (2025)
- Operating income: ▲US$1.08 billion (2025)
- Net income: ▲US$737 million (2025)
- Total assets: ▲US$8.91 billion (2025)
- Total equity: ▼US$4.00 billion (2025)
- Number of employees: 5,550 (2025)
- Divisions: Consumer Domestic; Consumer International; Specialty Products Division
- Website: churchdwight.com
- Footnotes; Financial figures, employee count and reporting divisions are from the company's 2025 annual report.

Church & Dwight Co., Inc. is an American consumer packaged goods company headquartered in Ewing Township, New Jersey. It manufactures and markets household, personal-care and specialty products in the United States and internationally. The company is best known for Arm & Hammer, whose baking soda and related products trace their origins to a business established by John Dwight and Austin Church in 1846. As of 2026, other major brands include Trojan, OxiClean, Nair, First Response, Orajel, Waterpik, Batiste, TheraBreath, Hero Cosmetics and Touchland.

Church & Dwight operates through three business segments: Consumer Domestic, Consumer International and Specialty Products. Its consumer businesses sell laundry, cleaning, oral-care, hair-care, skin-care and reproductive-health products, while its specialty-products division supplies sodium bicarbonate and related materials for industrial, agricultural, medical and food applications. The company is listed on the New York Stock Exchange and is a component of the S&P 500.

== History ==
=== Origins ===
In 1846, brothers-in-law Austin Church and John Dwight began preparing sodium bicarbonate, commonly known as baking soda, for commercial distribution in Dwight's kitchen. John Dwight & Company was formally established the following year. In 1867, Church & Company adopted the arm-and-hammer logo previously used by Austin Church's son James for his Vulcan Spice Mills business. Church & Company and John Dwight & Company merged in 1896 to form Church & Dwight Co., Inc.

In 1970, the company introduced Arm & Hammer Powder Laundry Detergent, which it described as the first nationally distributed phosphate-free laundry detergent. The Arm & Hammer name was unrelated to industrialist Armand Hammer. In 1986, his company, Occidental Petroleum, received a 5-percent interest in Church & Dwight and a seat on its board as part of an agreement involving a potassium-carbonate plant.

=== 2000s ===
On May 25, 2001, Church & Dwight acquired USA Detergents, adding the Xtra laundry-detergent and Nice 'n Fluffy fabric-softener brands.

On September 28, 2001, Church & Dwight and a partnership with Kelso & Company completed the acquisition of the consumer-products business of Carter-Wallace for $739 million. Church & Dwight acquired the Arrid antiperspirant and Lambert Kay pet-care businesses directly, while Armkel, its joint venture with Kelso, acquired brands including Trojan, Nair and First Response.

On October 20, 2003, Church & Dwight purchased the United States and Canadian rights to Unilever's Aim, Pepsodent, Mentadent and Close-Up oral-care brands. It paid approximately $104 million at closing and agreed to make additional performance-based payments.

The company acquired the Spinbrush battery-operated toothbrush business from Procter & Gamble on October 31, 2005. It paid $75 million at closing, with provisions for as much as $30 million in additional performance-based payments.

On August 7, 2006, Church & Dwight acquired substantially all the assets of Orange Glo International for approximately $325 million, adding the OxiClean, Kaboom and Orange Glo brands.

On July 7, 2008, the company acquired the over-the-counter pharmaceutical business of Del Pharmaceuticals from Coty for approximately $383 million, including fees. The acquired products included the Orajel brand of oral analgesics.

=== 2010s ===
On October 1, 2012, Church & Dwight acquired Avid Health, the owner of the VitaFusion and L'il Critters gummy-vitamin brands, for approximately $650 million.

On January 4, 2016, the company acquired Spencer Forrest, the maker of Toppik hair-building fibers, for approximately $175 million.

Church & Dwight acquired Water Pik on August 7, 2017, for approximately $1.02 billion. The acquisition included Waterpik water flossers and replacement showerheads.

=== 2020s ===
On December 1, 2020, Church & Dwight acquired Matrixx Initiatives, the owner of the Zicam cold-remedy brand, for $530 million.

The company completed its $580 million acquisition of the TheraBreath oral-care brand in December 2021.

On October 13, 2022, Church & Dwight acquired Hero Cosmetics, the developer of the Hero brand and its Mighty Patch acne-treatment products, in a transaction valued at approximately $630 million.

Richard Dierker became chief executive officer on April 2, 2025, succeeding Matthew Farrell upon Farrell's retirement.

On July 16, 2025, Church & Dwight completed its acquisition of Touchland, the developer of Touchland hand-sanitizer products. The agreement provided for approximately $700 million in upfront cash and restricted stock and as much as $180 million in additional payments based on the brand's 2025 sales.

Also in 2025, the company announced that it was exiting its Flawless, Spinbrush and Waterpik showerhead businesses. On December 31, it completed the sale of the VitaFusion and L'il Critters brands, related trademarks and licenses, and manufacturing and distribution facilities in Washington state to Piping Rock Health Products.

On May 28, 2026, Church & Dwight acquired the Miss Mouth's Messy Eater stain-removal brand for approximately $325 million.

== Brands ==
Church & Dwight identifies Arm & Hammer, OxiClean, Batiste, Waterpik, TheraBreath, Hero and Touchland as its seven "power brands", which the company considers to have significant potential for international expansion. Together, the brands accounted for approximately 70 percent of the company's net sales and profits in 2025. Other recognized consumer brands include Trojan, First Response, Nair, Orajel, Xtra and Zicam.

== See also ==
- Companies listed on the New York Stock Exchange (C)
- List of S&P 500 companies
