= List of copper ores =

Materials with copper content to be processed to recover copper

Following is a list of minerals that serve as copper ores in the copper mining process:

Image	Name	Formula	% Copper when pure
Sulfide ores
	Chalcopyrite	CuFeS_{2}	34.5
	Chalcocite	Cu_{2}S	79.8
	Covellite	CuS	66.5
	Bornite	2Cu_{2}S•CuS·FeS	63.3
	Tetrahedrite	Cu_{3}SbS_{3} + x(Fe,Zn)_{6}Sb_{2}S_{9}	32–45
	Digenite	Cu_{9}S_{5}	78.1
	Tennantite	Cu_{12}As_{4}S_{13}	51.6
	Enargite	Cu_{3}AsS_{4}	48.4
Carbonate ores
	Malachite	CuCO_{3}•Cu(OH)_{2}	57.7
	Azurite	2CuCO_{3}•Cu(OH)_{2}	55.1
Oxide ores
	Cuprite	Cu_{2}O	88.1
	Tenorite	CuO	79.7
Silicate ores
	Chrysocolla	(Cu,Al)_{2}H_{2}Si_{2}O_{5}(OH)_{4}•n(H_{2}O)	37.9
	Dioptase	CuSiO_{2}(OH)_{2}	45.3
