= Djurleite =

Copper sulfide mineral

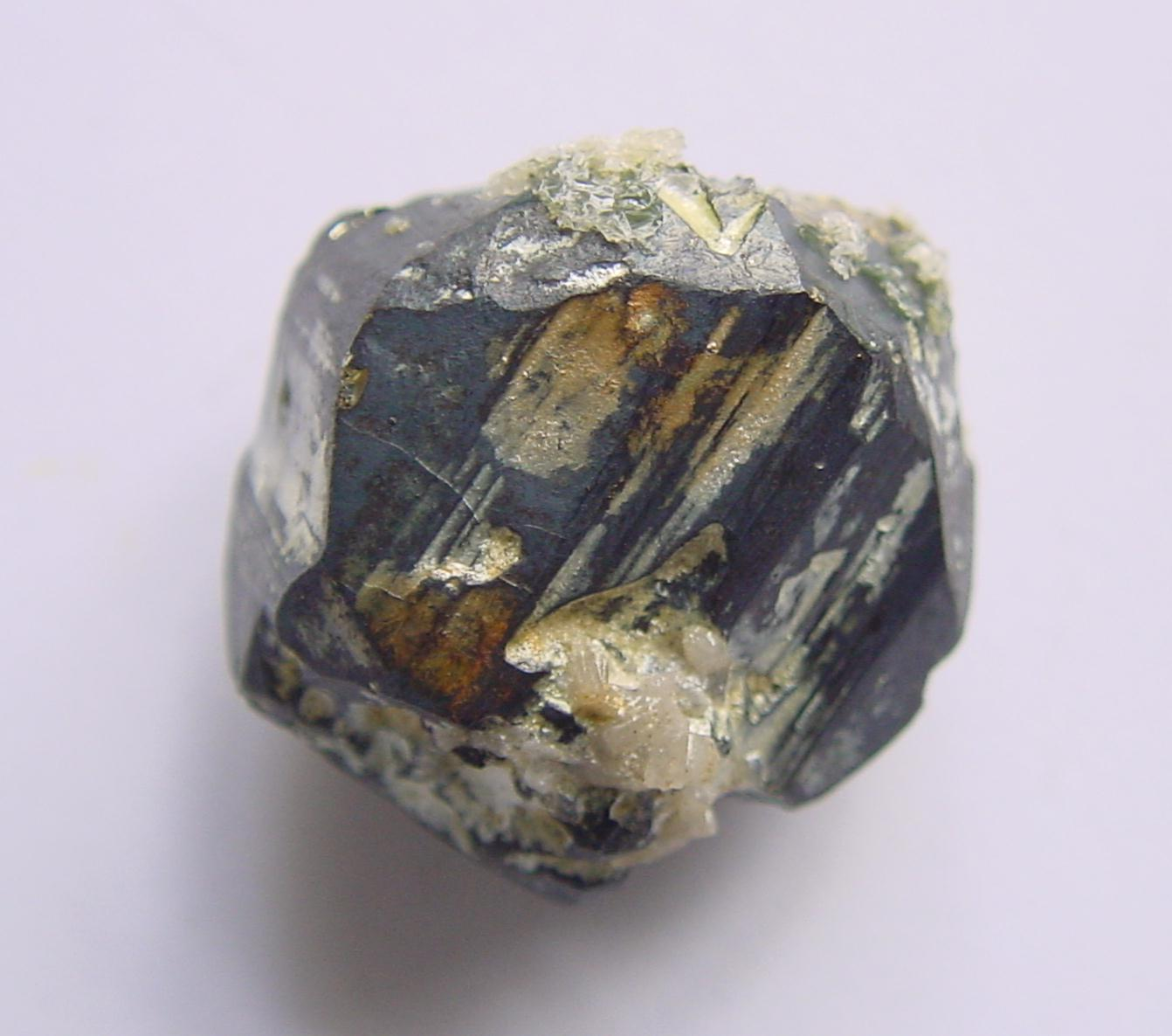
- Djurleite pseudomorph after pyrite from New Mexico, specimen size 2.4 cm

General
- Category: Copper sulfide
- Formula: Cu_{31}S_{16}
- IMA symbol: Dju
- Strunz classification: 2.BA.05b
- Dana classification: 2.4.7.2
- Crystal system: Monoclinic
- Crystal class: Prismatic (2/m) (same H-M symbol)
- Space group: P2_{1}/n
- Unit cell: a = 26.897, b = 15.745 c = 13.565 [Å]; β = 90.13°; Z = 8

Identification
- Formula mass: 2483 g/mol
- Color: Grey, blue-black or black
- Crystal habit: Crystals are short prismatic and thick tabular, also massive and compact
- Twinning: Pseudohexagonal twins are common, twin axis [100].
- Cleavage: None
- Fracture: Conchoidal
- Tenacity: Brittle
- Mohs scale hardness: 2 1/2 to 3
- Luster: Submetallic to metallic
- Streak: Black
- Diaphaneity: Opaque
- Specific gravity: 5.63

Djurleite is a copper sulfide mineral of secondary origin with formula Cu_{31}S_{16} that crystallizes with monoclinic-prismatic symmetry. It is typically massive in form, but does at times develop thin tabular to prismatic crystals. It occurs with other supergene minerals such as chalcocite, covellite and digenite in the enriched zone of copper orebodies. It is a member of the chalcocite group, and very similar to chalcocite, Cu_{2}S, in its composition and properties, but the two minerals can be distinguished from each other by x-ray powder diffraction. Intergrowths and transformations between djurleite, digenite and chalcocite are common. Many of the reported associations of digenite and djurleite, however, identified by powder diffraction, could be anilite and djurleite, as anilite transforms to digenite during grinding.

Djurleite was named for the Swedish chemist Seved Djurle (1928–2000), from the University of Uppsala, Sweden, who first synthesized the mineral in 1958, prior to its discovery in nature. The natural material was first described in 1962 by E H Roseboom Jr, of the US Geological Survey, from occurrences at the type locality, Barranca del Cobre, Chihuahua, Mexico.

== The chalcocite group ==
The chalcocite group is a group of closely related copper sulfides, with the formulae:

- Chalcocite (two polymorphs) Cu_{2}S
- Djurleite Cu_{31}S_{16} (Cu_{1.94}S)
- Digenite (Cu_{1.80}S)
- Roxbyite (Cu_{1.78}S)
- Anilite Cu_{7}S_{4} (Cu_{1.75}S)
- Geerite Cu_{8}S_{5} (Cu_{1.60}S)
- Spionkopite (Cu_{1.32}S)
- Covellite (CuS)

== Unit cell ==
Djurleite has a monoclinic structure with a large unit cell containing 248 copper and 128 sulfur atoms. The formula is Cu_{31}S_{16}, molar mass 2483 g, and there are 8 formula units per unit cell (Z = 8).

The crystal class is 2/m, meaning the structure has an axis of twofold rotational symmetry perpendicular to a mirror plane. The space group is P2_{1}/c, and the unit cell parameters are a = 26.897 Å, b = 15.745 Å, c = 13.565 Å and β = 90.13°. The structure is based on hexagonal closest packing of sulfur atoms with a monoclinic space group.

== Physical properties ==
Crystals are short prismatic and thick tabular, but the mineral usually occurs in a massive and compact form. There is no cleavage. Pseudohexagonal twins are common, with crystal blocks rotated around the a crystal axis, which is normal to the close-packed layers, by multiples of 60°. Djurleite is brittle, with a conchoidal (shell-like) fracture. It is a soft mineral, with hardness 2 1/2 to 3, a little less than that of calcite. The specific gravity, 5.63, is high, due to the copper content, djurleite is denser than the copper-iron sulfide bornite, but not as dense as the iron-arsenic sulfide arsenopyrite.

== Optical properties ==
Djurleite is grey, blue-black or black, with a black streak and a submetallic to metallic luster. It is an opaque mineral, so refractive indices are not defined. The reflectivity (the percentage of incident energy which is reflected from a surface) for light of wavelength 540 nm varies between 29.6 and 30.2, and is slightly dependent on the direction of the incident light, that is to say, the mineral is weakly anisotropic.

== Environment ==
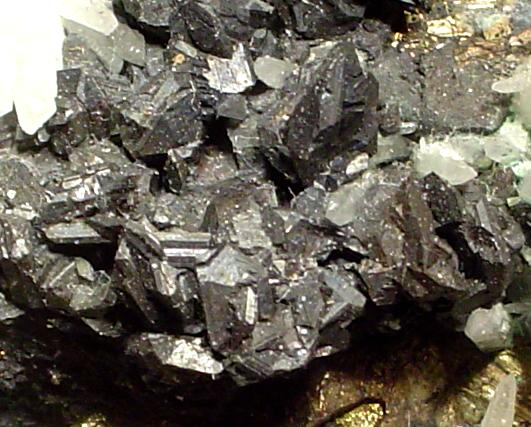
Djurleite with quartz and pyrite from Butte, Montana (size: 9.0 x 6.2 x 4.0 cm)

Djurleite is a widely distributed but little known ore mineral of copper, found in the secondary enrichment zones of copper deposits, associated with other secondary copper sulfides digenite, chalcocite, bornite, chalcopyrite and anilite with pyrite.

== Occurrence ==
The type locality is Barranca de Cobre, Chihuahua, Mexico, and the type material is conserved at the Royal Ontario Museum, Toronto, Canada, M25369, and at the National Museum of Natural History, Washington, DC, US.
