= Copper telluride =

Copper telluride may refer to:

- Weissite, a mineral, Cu_{2−x}Te
- Rickardite, a mineral, Cu_{7}Te_{5} (or Cu_{3−x (x = 0 to 0.36)}Te_{2})
- Copper(I) telluride, Cu_{2}Te
- Copper(II) telluride, CuTe, which occurs as the mineral vulcanite
- Copper ditelluride, CuTe_{2}
- Tellurium copper, copper alloy with tellurium

== See also ==
- Kostovite, a rare telluride mineral containing copper and gold, AuCuTe_{4}
- Copper sulfide
- Copper selenide
