= Copper sulfide =

Any inorganic compound consisting of copper and sulfur atoms only

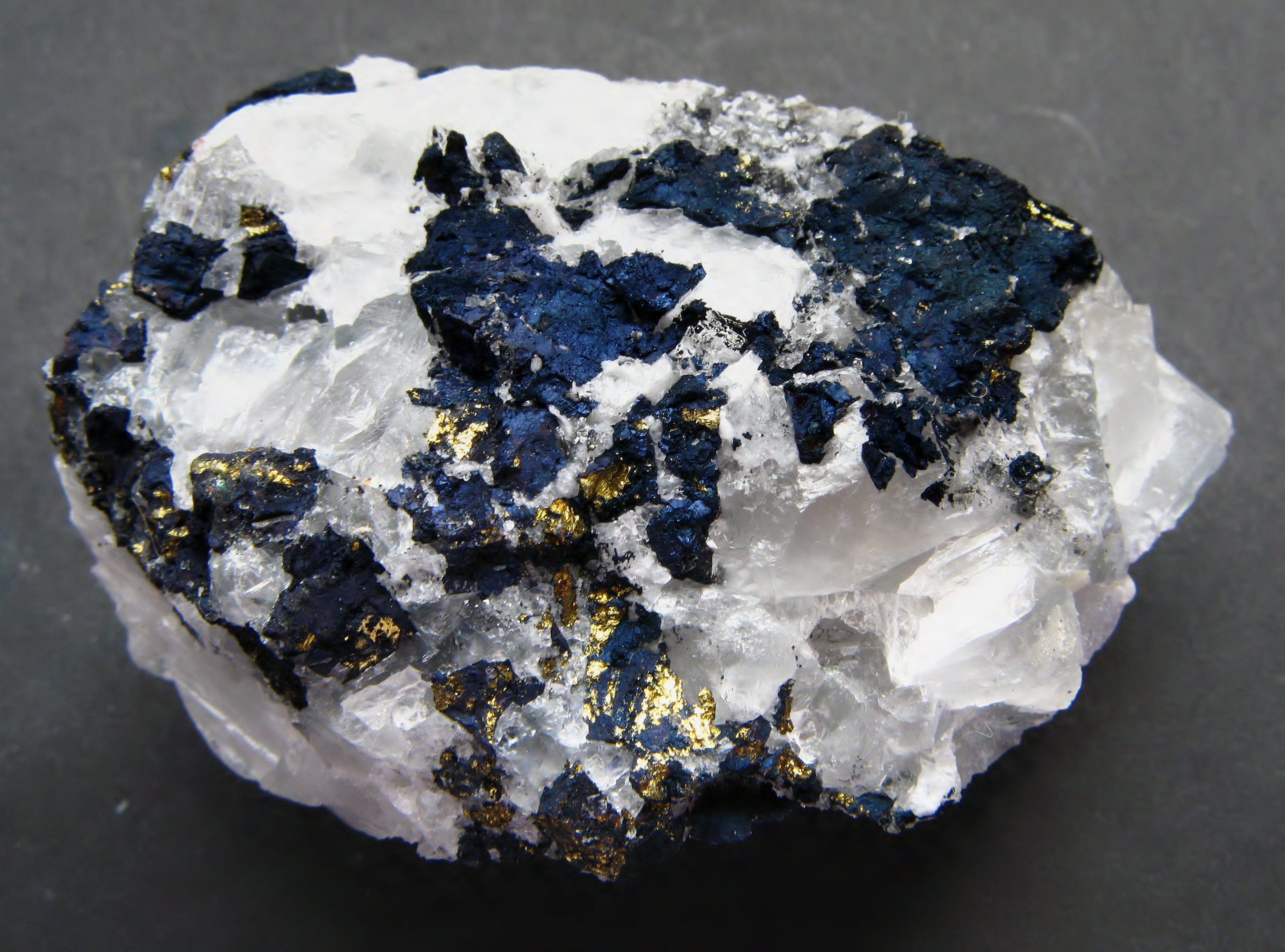
Covellite (CuS)

Copper sulfides describe a family of chemical compounds and minerals with the formula Cu_{x}S_{y}. Both minerals and synthetic materials comprise these compounds. Some copper sulfides are economically important ores.

Prominent copper sulfide minerals include Cu_{2}S (chalcocite) and CuS (covellite). In the mining industry, the minerals bornite or chalcopyrite, which consist of mixed copper-iron sulfides, are often referred to as "copper sulfides". In chemistry, a "binary copper sulfide" is any binary chemical compound of the elements copper and sulfur. Whatever their source, copper sulfides vary widely in composition with 0.5 ≤ Cu/S ≤ 2, including numerous non-stoichiometric compounds.

== Known copper sulfides ==
The naturally occurring mineral binary compounds of copper and sulfur are listed below. Investigations of covellite (CuS) indicate that there are other metastable Cu-S phases still to be fully characterised.

- CuS_{2}, villamaninite or (Cu,Ni,Co,Fe)S_{2}
- CuS, covellite, copper monosulfide
- Cu_{9}S_{8} (Cu_{1.12}S), yarrowite
- Cu_{39}S_{28} (Cu_{1.39}S) spionkopite
- Cu_{8}S_{5} (Cu_{1.6}S), geerite
- Cu_{7}S_{4} (Cu_{1.75}S), anilite
- Cu_{9}S_{5} (Cu_{1.8}S), digenite
- Cu_{58}S_{32} (Cu_{1.8}S), roxbyite
- Cu_{31}S_{16} (Cu_{1.96}S), djurleite
- Cu_{2}S, chalcocite

== Classes of copper sulfides ==
Copper sulfides can be classified into three groups:

Monosulfides, 1.6 ≤ Cu/S ≤ 2: their crystal structures consist of isolated sulfide anions that are closely related to either hcp or fcc lattices, without any direct S-S bonds. The copper ions are distributed in a complicated manner over interstitial sites with both trigonal as well as distorted tetrahedral coordination and are rather mobile. Therefore, this group of copper sulfides shows ionic conductivity at slightly elevated temperatures. In addition, the majority of its members are semiconductors.

Mixed monosulfide and disulfide compounds of copper contain both monosulfide (S^{2−}) as well as disulfide (S_{2})^{n−} anions. Their crystal structures usually consist of alternating hexagonal layers of monosulfide and disulfide anions with Cu cations in trigonal and tetrahedral interstices. CuS, for example, can be written as Cu_{3}(S_{2})S. Several nonstoichiometric compounds with Cu:S ratios between 1.0 and 1.4 also contain both monosulfide as well as disulfide ions. Depending on their composition, these copper sulfides are either semiconductors or metallic conductors.

At very high pressures, a copper disulfide, CuS_{2}, can be synthesized. Its crystal structure is analogous to that of pyrite, with all sulfur atoms occurring as S-S units. Copper disulfide is a metallic conductor due to the incomplete occupancy of the sulfur p band. Different stoichiometric compositions can be obtained by changing the redox atmosphere of the synthetic environment.[6]

== Oxidation states of copper and sulfur ==
The bonding in copper sulfides cannot be correctly described in terms of a simple oxidation state formalism because the Cu-S bonds are somewhat covalent rather than ionic in character, and have a high degree of delocalization resulting in complicated electronic band structures. Although many textbooks (e.g.) give the mixed valence formula (Cu^{+})_{2}(Cu^{2+})(S^{2−})(S_{2})^{2−} for CuS, X-ray photoelectron spectroscopic data give strong evidence that, in terms of the simple oxidation state formalism, all the known copper sulfides should be considered as purely monovalent copper compounds, and more appropriate formulae would be (Cu^{+})_{3}(S^{2−})(S_{2})^{−} for CuS, and (Cu^{+})(S_{2})^{−} for CuS_{2}, respectively.

Further evidence that the assignment of the so-called "valence hole" should be to the S_{2} units in these two formulae is the length of the S-S bonds, which are significantly shorter in CuS (0.207 nm) and CuS_{2} (0.203 nm) than in the "classical" disulfide Fe^{2+}(S_{2})^{2−} (0.218 nm). This bond length difference has been ascribed to the higher bond order in (S-S)^{−} compared to (S-S)^{2−} due to electrons being removed from a π* antibonding orbital. NMR studies on CuS show that there are two distinct species of copper atom, one with a more metallic nature than the other. This apparent discrepancy with the X-ray photo-electron spectrum data simply highlights the problem that NMR has in assigning oxidation states in a mixed-valence compound. The issue of the valence of copper in sulfides (as well as selenides and tellurides) continues to be revisited in the literature. A good example is a 2009 study of the ternary compound CuCo_{2}S_{4} (a spinel mineral known as carrollite) that "was undertaken primarily to establish unequivocally the oxidation state of the Cu in the mineral" and concluded "that the experimental and simulated Cu L2,3 absorption spectra established an unequivocal oxidation state of CuI in the carrollite bulk".

== See also ==
- Copper(I) sulfide
- Copper(II) sulfide
