= Digenite =

Copper sulfide mineral

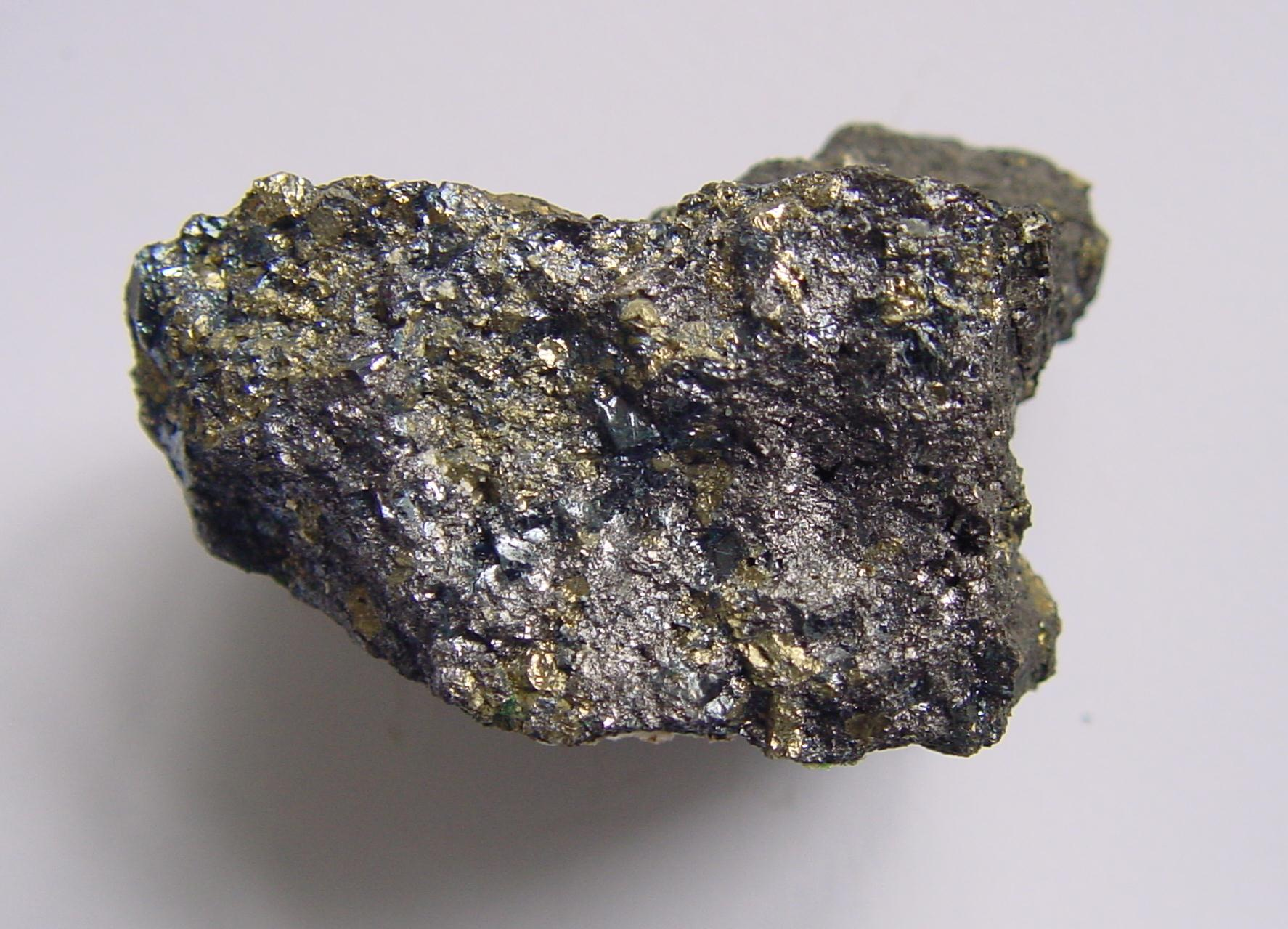
- Digenite from the East Colusa Mine, Butte, Montana, US. Specimen size = 4.3 cm

General
- Category: Sulfide mineral
- Formula: Cu_{9}S_{5}
- IMA symbol: Dg
- Strunz classification: 2.BA.05e
- Dana classification: 02.04.07.03
- Crystal system: Trigonal
- Crystal class: Hexagonal scalenohedral (3̅m); H-M symbol: (3̅ 2/m)
- Space group: R3̅m

Identification
- Formula mass: 146.45 g/mol
- Color: Blue to black
- Crystal habit: Pseudocubic crystals are rare, usually as intergrowths with other copper sulfides
- Cleavage: {111} (observed in synthetic material)
- Fracture: Conchoidal
- Tenacity: Brittle
- Mohs scale hardness: 2.5 to 3
- Luster: Submetallic to metallic
- Streak: Black
- Diaphaneity: Opaque
- Specific gravity: 5.5 to 5.7 observed, 5.628 calculated
- Optical properties: Reflectivity: 21.6 at 540 nm
- Other characteristics: Distinctly blue in polished sections

Digenite is a copper sulfide mineral with formula: Cu_{9}S_{5}. Digenite is a black to dark blue opaque mineral that crystallizes with a trigonal–hexagonal scalenohedral structure. In habit it is usually massive, but does often show pseudo-cubic forms. It has poor to indistinct cleavage and a brittle fracture. It has a Mohs hardness of 2.5 to 3 and a specific gravity of 5.6. It is found in copper sulfide deposits of both primary and supergene occurrences. It is typically associated with and often intergrown with chalcocite, covellite, djurleite, bornite, chalcopyrite and pyrite. The type locality is Sangerhausen, Thuringia, Germany, in copper slate deposits.

== Occurrence ==
Digenite occurs in the transitional zone of supergene oxidation of primary sulfide ore deposits, at the interface between the upper and lower saprolite ore zones. It is rarely an important mineral for copper ores, as it is more usually replaced by chalcocite further up in the weathering profile, and is a minor weathering product of primary chalcopyrite. Natural digenite always contains a small amount of iron and is considered to be stable only in the Cu-Fe-S system.

In the Deflector and Deflector West Cu-Au lode deposits of the Gullewa Greenstone Belt, Western Australia, digenite is an important constituent of the transitional Cu-Au ore. However, it is difficult to treat metallurgically and remains a refractory ore type. In this locality digenite is found with covellite, chalcocite and bornite.

It was first described in 1844 from the type locality of Sangerhausen, Saxony-Anhalt, Germany. The name is from the Greek digenus meaning of two origins in reference to its close resemblance with chalcocite and covellite.

== Polymorphs of digenite ==
There are three polymorphs of digenite, high, metastable and low. There is a complete solid solution series between high digenite and berzelianite Cu_{2−x}Se (x~0.12).

High digenite is stable above 73 °C, with space group Fm3̅m and unit cell parameters a = 5.57 Å and Z = 1 for formula Cu_{7.2−x}S_{4}. High digenite is isostructural with bornite Cu_{5}FeS_{4}.

Metastable digenite forms on cooling from 73 °C. It appears to be isometric with space group Fd3̅m and a = 27.85 Å. This symmetry, however, is due to twinning of fine domains with rhombohedral symmetry, trigonal -3m, point group R-3m, a = 3.92 Å, c = 48 Å, Z = 15 for formula Cu_{1.8}S. Metastable digenite changes with time to stable low temperature digenite or a mixture of anilite Cu_{7}S_{4} and djurleite Cu_{31}S_{16}.

Low digenite is isometric, space group Fd3̅m and a = 27.85 Å, i.e. the same as the apparent isometric symmetry of the metastable polymorph, Z=4 for formula Cu_{1.8}S.
