= Supergene (geology) =

In geology, processes or enrichment that occur near the surface

In ore deposit geology, supergene processes or enrichment are those that occur relatively near the surface as opposed to deep hypogene processes. Supergene processes include the predominance of meteoric water circulation (i.e. water derived from precipitation) with concomitant oxidation and chemical weathering. The descending meteoric waters oxidize the primary (hypogene) sulfide ore minerals and redistribute the metallic ore elements. Supergene enrichment occurs at the base of the oxidized portion of an ore deposit. Metals that have been leached from the oxidized ore are carried downward by percolating groundwater, and react with hypogene sulfides at the supergene-hypogene boundary. The reaction produces secondary sulfides with metal contents higher than those of the primary ore. This is particularly noted in copper ore deposits where the copper sulfide minerals chalcocite (Cu_{2}S), covellite (CuS), digenite (Cu_{18}S_{10}), and djurleite (Cu_{31}S_{16}) are deposited by the descending surface waters.

All such processes take place at essentially atmospheric conditions, around room temperature (25 °C) and standard atmospheric pressure (1 atm).

== Zones ==
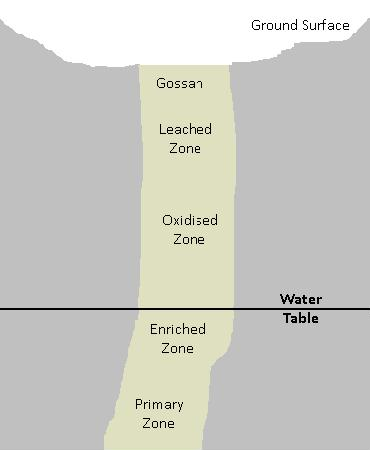
Idealized mineral vein

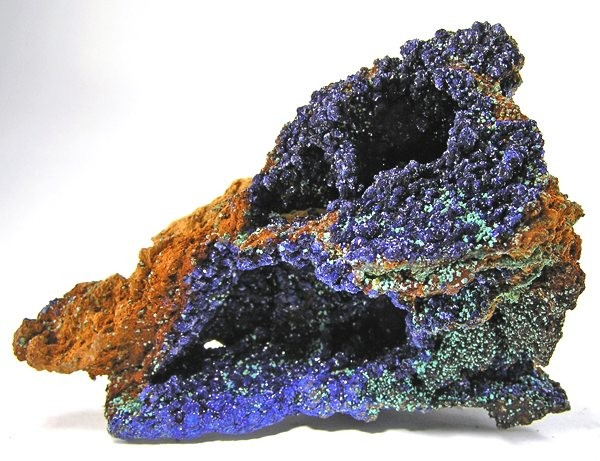
Azurite and malachite on limonite from Bisbee, Arizona

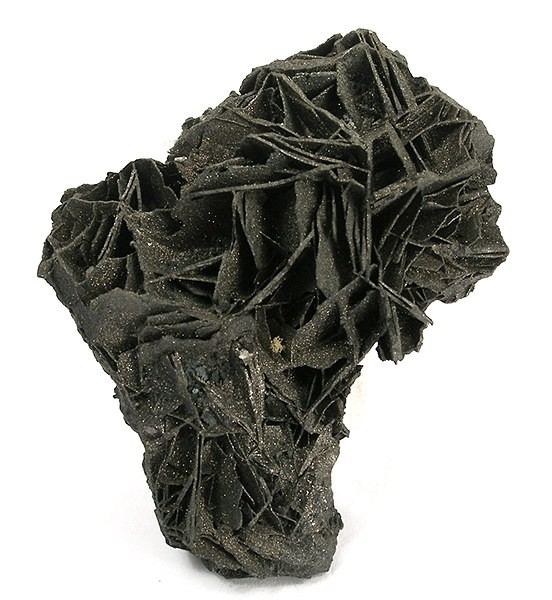
Chalcocite pseudomorph after covellite from Butte, Montana

Distinct zones of supergene processes can be identified at various depths. From the surface down they are the gossan cap, leached zone, oxidized zone, water table, enriched zone (supergene enriched zone) and primary zone (hypogene zone).

=== Gossan cap ===
Pyrite (FeS_{2}) has oxidised to form goethite (FeO(OH)) and limonite (FeO(OH)·nH_{2}O), which form a porous covering over the oxidized zone known as a gossan cap or iron hat. Prospectors use gossan as an indication of ore reserves.

=== Leached zone ===
Groundwater contains dissolved oxygen and carbon dioxide. As it travels downwards it oxidizes primary sulfide minerals, concomitant with forming sulfuric acid and solutions of oxidized metals. For example, groundwater commonly interacts with pyrite (FeS_{2}) to form an oxidized iron (FeO(OH)) and sulfuric acid (H_{2}SO_{4}), portrayed in the idealized chemical reaction below (intermediate steps omitted):

4 FeS_{2} + 12 H_{2}O + 15 O_{2} → 4 FeO(OH) + 8 H_{2}SO_{4}

An intermediate in this process is ferric sulfate (Fe_{2}(SO_{4})_{3}), which oxidizes pyrite and other sulfide minerals.

=== Oxidized zone ===
Above the water table the environment is oxidizing, and below it is reducing. Solutions traveling downward from the leached zone react with other primary minerals in the oxidised zone to form secondary minerals such as sulfates and carbonates, and limonite, which is a characteristic product in all oxidised zones.

In the formation of secondary carbonates, primary sulfide minerals generally are first converted to sulfates, which in turn react with primary carbonates such as calcite (CaCO_{3}), dolomite (CaMg(CO_{3})_{2}) or aragonite (also CaCO_{3}, polymorphic with calcite) to produce secondary carbonates. Soluble salts continue on down, but insoluble salts are left behind in the oxidised zone where they form. Examples of insoluble salts that are commonly found in the oxidized zone include lead precipitates like anglesite (PbSO_{4}) and pyromorphite (Pb_{5}(PO_{4})_{3}Cl); copper precipitates like malachite (Cu_{2}(CO_{3}(OH)_{2}), azurite (Cu_{3}(CO_{3})_{2}(OH)_{2}), and cuprite (Cu_{2}O); and smithsonite (ZnCO_{3}).

=== Water table ===
At the water table the environment changes from an oxidizing environment to a reducing one.

=== Enriched zone ===
Copper ions that move down into this reducing environment form a zone of supergene sulfide enrichment. Covellite (CuS), chalcocite (Cu_{2}S) and native copper (Cu) are stable in these conditions and they are characteristic of the enriched zone.

The net effect of these supergene processes is to move metal ions from the leached zone to the enriched zone, increasing the concentration there to levels higher than in the unmodified primary zone below, possibly producing a deposit worth mining.

=== Primary zone ===
The primary zone contains unaltered primary minerals.

== Mineral alterations ==
Chalcopyrite CuFeS_{2} (primary) readily alters to the secondary minerals bornite Cu_{5}FeS_{4}, covellite CuS and brochantite Cu_{4}SO_{4}(OH)_{6}.

Galena PbS (primary) alters to secondary anglesite PbSO_{4} and cerussite PbCO_{3}.

Sphalerite ZnS (primary) alters to secondary hemimorphite Zn_{4}Si_{2}O_{7}(OH)_{2}.H_{2}O, smithsonite ZnCO_{3} and manganese-bearing willemite Zn_{2}SiO_{4}.

Pyrite FeS_{2} (primary) alters to secondary melanterite FeSO_{4}.7H_{2}O.

If the original deposits contain arsenic and phosphorus bearing minerals, secondary arsenates and phosphates will be formed.

== Etymology ==
The word supergene is derived from the Latin root super meaning 'above' and the Greek root -gene (-γενής) meaning 'born' or 'produced'. The terms supergene and hypogene refer to the depth at which they occur.

== See also ==
- Hypogene
