= Copper(I) sulfide =

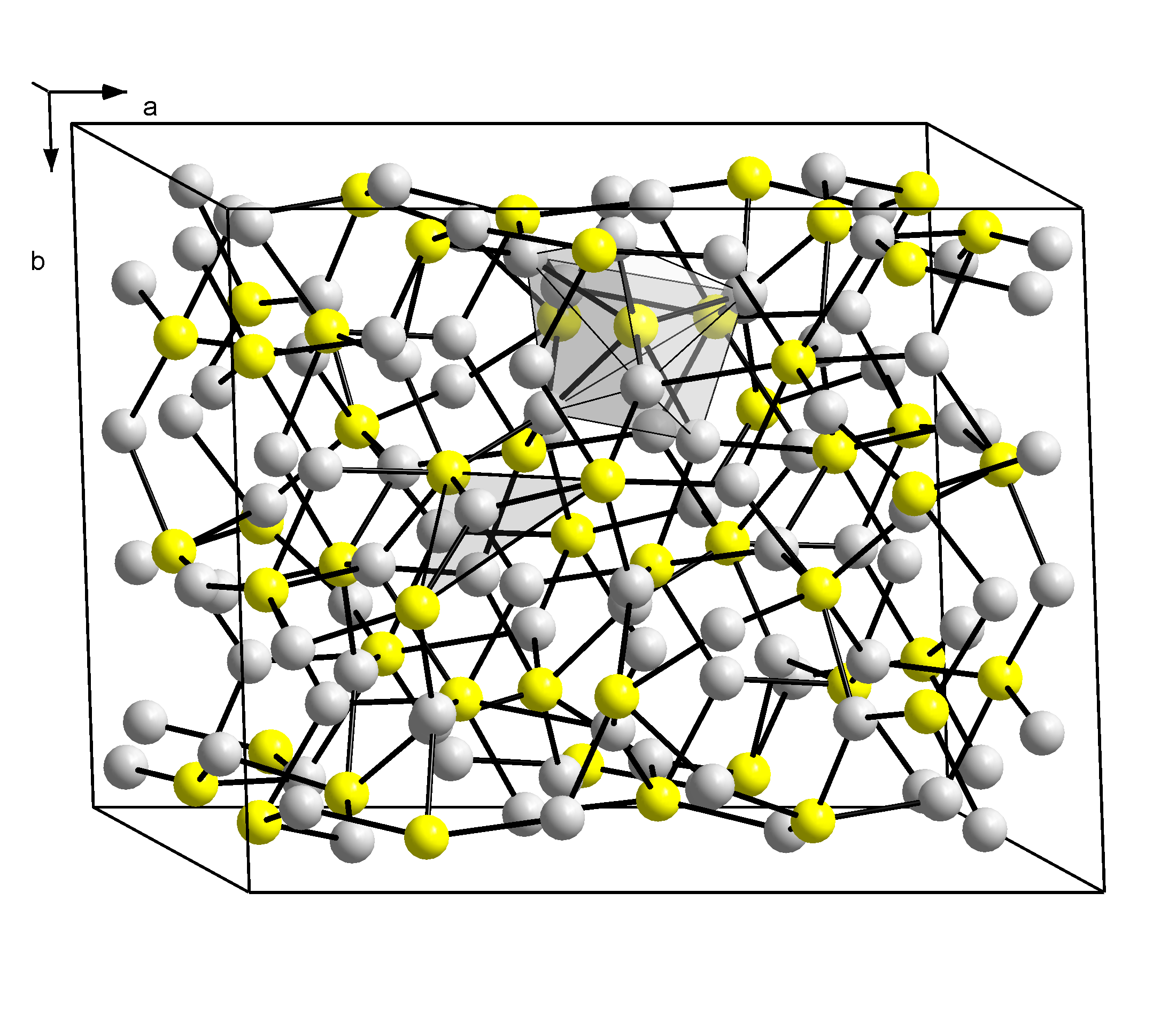

Names
- IUPAC name Copper(I) sulfide
- Other names Cuprous sulfide Chalcocite; Copper glance

Identifiers
CAS Number	22205-45-4
3D model (JSmol)	Interactive image
ChEBI	CHEBI:51114
ChemSpider	8305611
ECHA InfoCard	100.040.751
PubChem CID	10130093; 62755 (chalcocite)
RTECS number	GL8910000
UNII	349M3C1RS1
CompTox Dashboard (EPA)	DTXSID0041804
- InChI: InChI=1S/2Cu.S/q2*+1;-2 Key: AQMRBJNRFUQADD-UHFFFAOYSA-N; InChI=1/2Cu.S/q2*+1;-2 Key: AQMRBJNRFUQADD-UHFFFAOYAN
- SMILES: [Cu+].[Cu+].[S-2]

Properties
Chemical formula	Cu_{2}S
Molar mass	159.15 g·mol^{−1}
Appearance	blue to grayish black lustrous solid
Density	5.6 g/cm^{3}
Melting point	1,130 °C (2,070 °F; 1,400 K)
Solubility in water	insoluble
Solubility	insoluble in acetic acid decomposes in nitric acid and sulfuric acid slightly soluble in hydrochloric acid

Hazards
NFPA 704 (fire diamond)	0 0 0
Flash point	Nonflammable
- NIOSH (US health exposure limits)
PEL (Permissible)	TWA 1 mg/m^{3} (as Cu)
REL (Recommended)	TWA 1 mg/m^{3} (as Cu)
IDLH (Immediate danger)	TWA 100 mg/m^{3} (as Cu)
Safety data sheet (SDS)	Sigma-Aldrich

Related compounds
Other anions	Copper(I) oxide; Copper(I) selenide
Other cations	Nickel(II) sulfide; Copper(II) sulfide; Zinc sulfide
- Except where otherwise noted, data are given for materials in their standard state (at 25 °C [77 °F], 100 kPa). verify (what is ?) Infobox references

Copper(I) sulfide is a copper sulfide, a chemical compound of copper and sulfur. It has the chemical formula of Cu_{2}S. It is found in nature as the mineral chalcocite. It has a narrow range of stoichiometry ranging from Cu_{1.997}S to Cu_{2.000}S. Samples are typically black.

== Structure ==
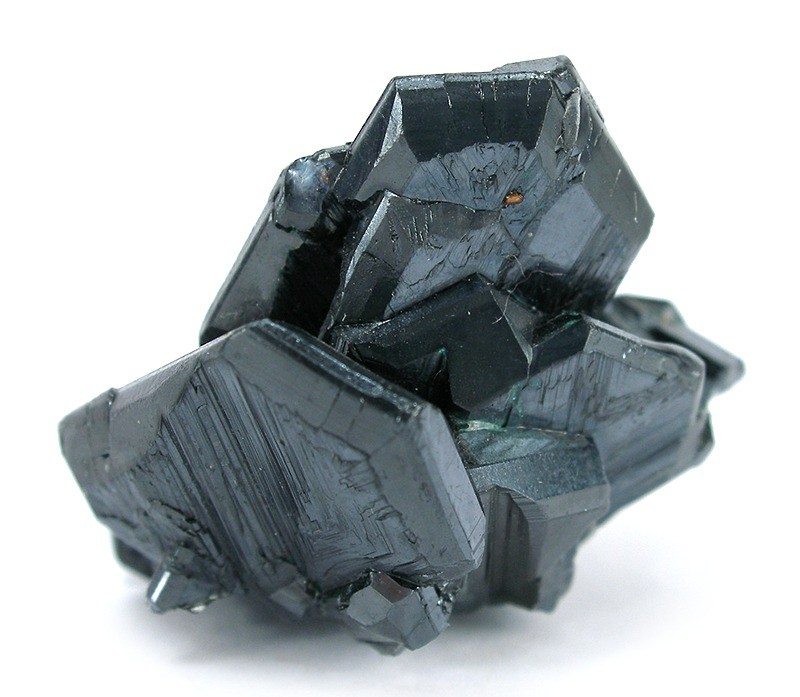
Crystals of chalcocite (mineral form of Cu_{2}S).

=== Stoichiometric ===
Two forms (a dimorphism) of Cu_{2}S are known. The so-called low temperature monoclinic form ("low-chalcocite") has a complex structure with 96 copper atoms in the unit cell. The hexagonal form, stable above 104 °C (219 °F), has 24 crystallographically distinct Cu atoms. Its structure has been described as approximating to a hexagonal close packed array of sulfur atoms with Cu atoms in planar 3 coordination. This structure was initially assigned an orthorhombic cell due to the twinning of the sample crystal.

=== Non-stoichiometric ===
As illustrated by the mineral djurleite, other cuprous sulfides are known. With the approximate formula Cu_{1.96}S, this material is non-stoichiometric (range Cu_{1.934}S-Cu_{1.965}S and has a monoclinic structure with 248 copper and 128 sulfur atoms in the unit cell. Cu_{2}S and Cu_{1.96}S are similar in appearance and hard to distinguish one from another.

=== Phase transition ===
The electrical resistivity increases abruptly at the phase transition point around 104 °C (219 °F), with the precise temperature depending on the stoichiometry.

== Preparation ==
Cu_{2}S can be prepared by treating copper with sulfur or H_{2}S. The rate depends on the particle size and temperature. Cu_{2}S reacts with oxygen to form SO_{2}:

2 Cu_{2}S + 3 O_{2} → 2 Cu_{2}O + 2 SO_{2}

== Reactions ==
The production of copper from chalcocite is a typical process in extracting the metal from ores. Usually, the conversion involves roasting, to give Cu_{2}O as an intermediate which is further reduced to the metal, and sulfur dioxide:

Cu_{2}S + O_{2} → 2 Cu + SO_{2}

Copper(I) oxide readily converts to copper(II) oxide when heated in the presence of oxygen, and to copper metal upon heating in a reducing environment. (cf. Carbothermic reduction)

== See also ==
- Copper sulfide for an overview of all copper sulfide phases
- Copper monosulfide, CuS
- Chalcocite
- Djurleite
- LK-99 - compound evaluated in 2023 for possible superconductivity
