= Copper selenide =

Copper selenide may refer to:

- Copper(I) selenide
- Copper(II) selenide
