= Ani Mine =

Complex of mines in Japan

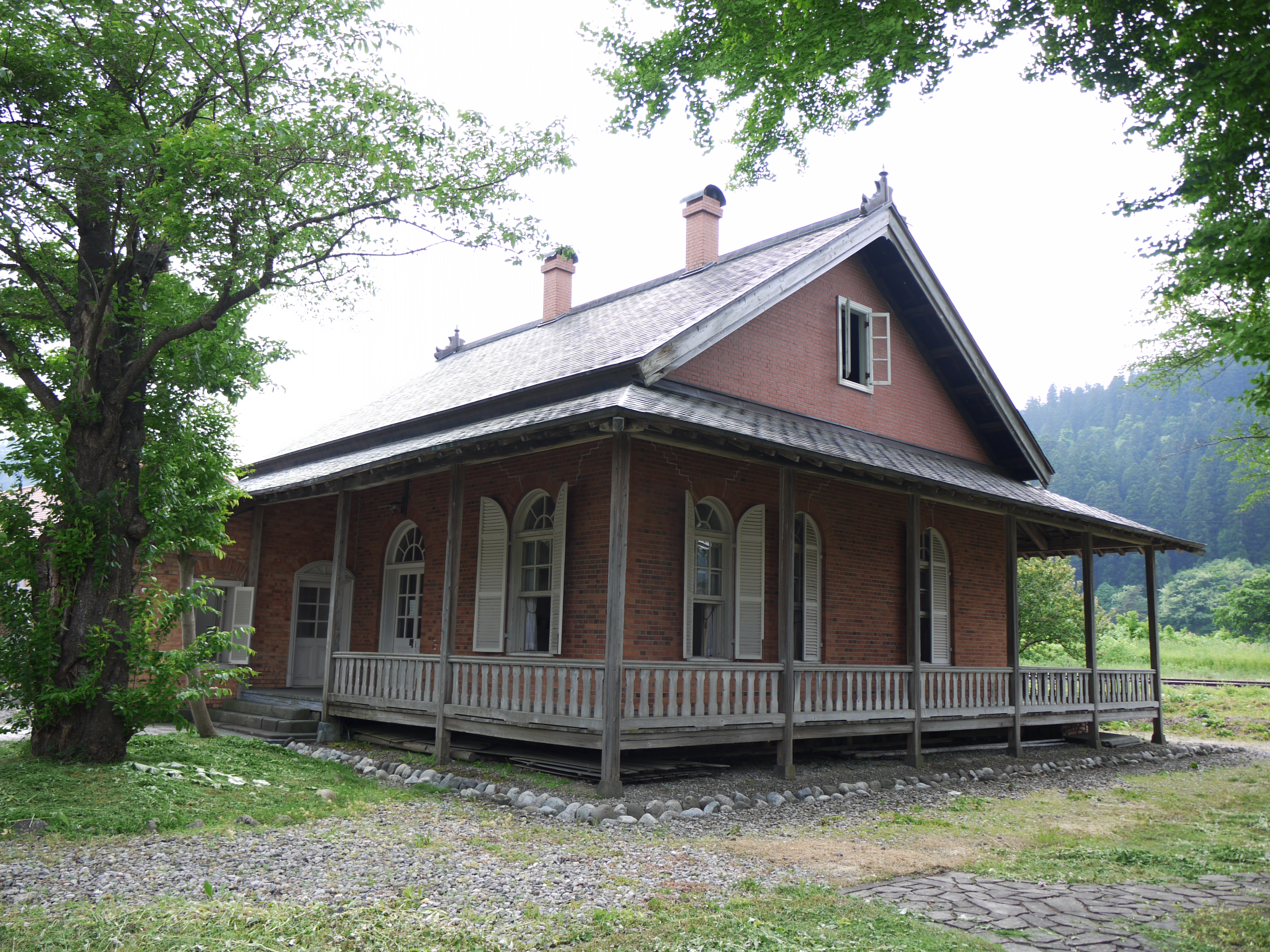
- The German engineers' cabin at Ani Mine

- Location within Japan
- Location: Kitaakita, Akita, Japan; 39°58′44″N 140°25′49″E
- Products: Copper, gold
- Opened: 17th century
- Closed: 1986
- Company: Akita Domain; Furukawa Mining Co., Ltd.

Ani Mine (阿仁鉱山, Ani-kōzan) is the general name for a complex of six mines near the former town of Ani, now part of the city of Kitaakita, Japan. Situated in the valley of the Ani River, the workings extend for several kilometres under Mount Moriyoshi. The mines were a source of copper and gold.

== History ==
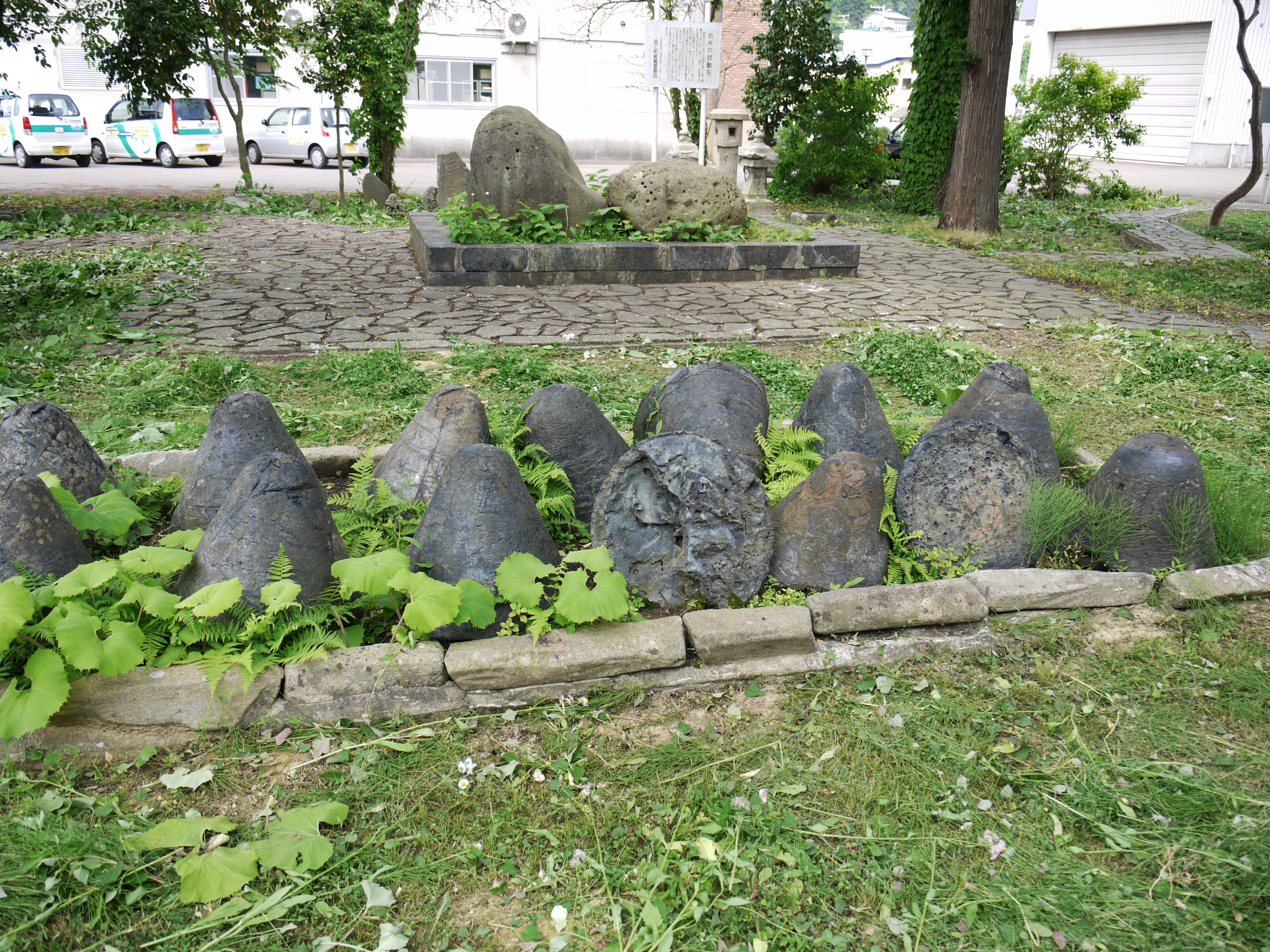
Blocks of slag from the Ani smelting plant

A placer deposit of gold was discovered near Ani in 1309. It is unclear when mining operations began at Ani, with two different documents giving the years 1637 and 1670. The mine's first owner was Aoyama Seizaemon (青山 清左衛門), a merchant from Ōmi Province.

By the 18th century the Ani Mine was operated by the Akita Domain and accounted for almost half of Japan's national supply of copper. In 1764, the Tokugawa authorities attempted to nationalise the mine to secure a strategic reserve of copper. The Akita Domain reacted strongly, and after negotiations the confiscation order was revoked.

In 1773, the Akita Domain hired the engineers Hiraga Gennai and Yoshida Rihē to improve the smelting techniques used at Ani. Reportedly, the Ani miners got along well with the sincere Yoshida but disliked Hiraga's arrogant personality.

During the early Meiji period, a team of German mining engineers led by Adolf Metzger were hired by the Japanese government to renovate Ani Mine's smelting and logistics with European technology. In 1879, two buildings were constructed as official lodgings for the Germans. These were built in a simple Gothic architectural style using bricks fired from local clay and featured one of Japan's first billiard tables.

In the early 1880s, pneumatic rock drills were used underground at Ani. Some of these drills were later transferred to the Ashio Copper Mine.

During the Great Depression, the Ani Mine temporarily ceased operation due to falling demand for copper. The mine closed again in 1970 due to depletion of the ore veins. After the discovery of new veins, an attempt was made to reopen the mine but this proved unprofitable and the mine was abandoned in 1986.

== Subsidiary mines ==
- Ani-Kozawa mine (阿仁小沢鉱山)
- Ani-Magisawa mine (阿仁真木沢鉱山)
- Ani-Kayakusa mine (阿仁萱草鉱山)
- Ani-Sanmai mine (阿仁三枚鉱山)
- Ani-Ichinomata mine (阿仁一ノ又鉱山)
- Ani-Ninomata mine (阿仁二ノ又鉱山)

== See also ==
- Anilite
- Kamaishi Mine
