= Enargite =

Copper arsenic sulfosalt mineral (Cu3AsS4)

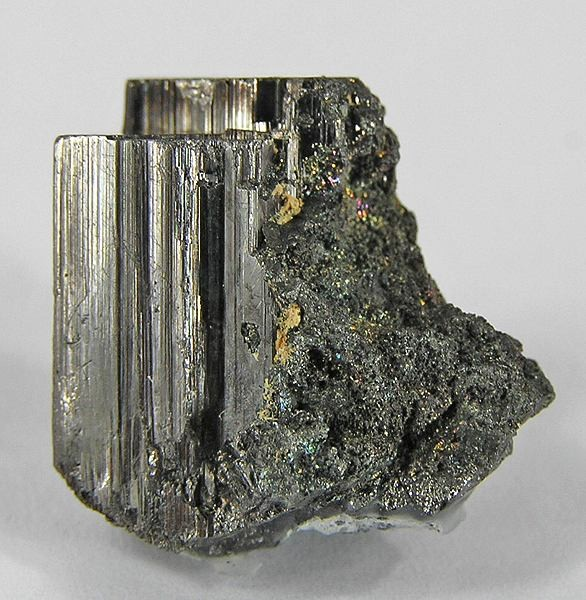

General
- Category: Sulfosalt mineral
- Formula: Cu_{3}AsS_{4}
- IMA symbol: Eng
- Strunz classification: 2.KA.05
- Crystal system: Orthorhombic
- Crystal class: Pyramidal (mm2); H-M symbol: (mm2)
- Space group: Pmn2_{1}
- Unit cell: a = 7.407(1), b = 6.436(1) c = 6.154(1) [Å]; Z = 2

Identification
- Color: Grayish black to iron black; gray to pale pink-brown, deep red internal reflections in polished section
- Crystal habit: Tabular to prismatic crystals, striated parallel to {001}; massive
- Twinning: Twin plane {320} common, rarely as interpenetrating pseudohexagonal trillings
- Cleavage: Perfect on {110}, distinct {100} and {010}
- Fracture: Uneven
- Tenacity: Brittle
- Mohs scale hardness: 3
- Luster: Metallic to dull
- Streak: Black
- Diaphaneity: Opaque
- Specific gravity: 4.4 to 4.5

Enargite is a copper arsenic sulfosalt mineral with formula Cu_{3}AsS_{4}. It takes its name from the Greek word enarge 'distinct'. Enargite is a steel gray, blackish gray, to violet black mineral with metallic luster. It forms slender orthorhombic prisms as well as massive aggregates. It has a hardness of 3 and a specific gravity of 4.45.

Enargite is dimorph of the tetragonal luzonite.

== Occurrence ==
It is a medium to low temperature hydrothermal mineral occurring with quartz, pyrite, sphalerite, galena, bornite, tetrahedrite–tennantite, chalcocite, covellite and baryte. It occurs in the mineral deposits at Butte, Montana, San Juan Mountains, Colorado and at both Bingham Canyon and Tintic, Utah. It is also found in copper deposits of Canada, Mexico, Argentina, Chile, Peru, Australia and the Philippines.

Enargite was originally described as a new species from the copper mines of the San Francisco vein, Junin Department, Peru. The name is from Greek έναργής ("distinct"), in reference to its distinct cleavage.

Enargite is related to lazarevicite (named after M. Lazarevic), which has the same chemical formula, but cubic crystalline structure.
