= Nicola Covelli =

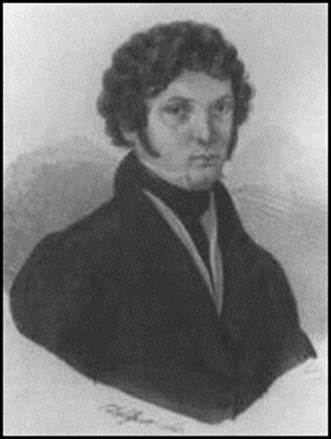

Nicola Covelli (20 January 1790 – 15 December 1829) was an Italian chemist and naturalist. He took a special interest in Vesuvius and volcanic minerals. The mineral Covellite is named after him.

== Life and work ==
Covelli was born in Caiazzo to Giuseppe and Angela Sanillo. He studied in Caiazzo and then went to the University of Naples where he studied medicine followed by chemistry and botany. In 1812 he and some other students were given a scholarship by Joachim Murat to travel to Paris to study comparative medicine and natural history. He interacted with the circle of French scientists of the period including Alexandre Brongniart, Jean-Baptiste Lamarck, René Louiche Desfontaines, Louis Jacques Thénard, Louis Nicolas Vauquelin and René Just Haüy. This made him more interested in chemistry and mineralogy. He returned to Naples in 1815 and took up a chair of chemistry and botany at the veterinary school. In 1821 he was removed from his position for having associated himself with the Carbonari. He then ran a pharmacy in Naples. He studied mineralogy and geology and was particularly interested in the materials from volcanos, studying Vesuvius in particular. He collaborated with Teodoro Monticelli on the subject. He examined volcanic eruptions in the years 1821-23. He was able to estimate the temperature of the lava and was able to identify several chemicals including sodium chloride, sodium carbonate, potassium sulphate, ferric oxide and calcium sulfate. He was also able to examine the presence of water, sulfur, ammonium chloride, sulfur dioxide and carbon dioxide in the volcanic fumes. He found a cupper sulfide mineral around the fumaroles of Vesuvius which was named as Covellite by François Sulpice Beudant in his honour in 1826. Covelli named a mineral Beudantina after Beudant. In 1826 he examined the plant remains, such as olive oil inside amphorae, found in the excavations of Pompeii. He also examined coal in Abruzzo and the composition of mineral waters. His work and fame grew and he was made professor of applied chemistry in 1829 despite his past political associations but he did not live long and died of pneumonia about five months later. He was to help with the construction of bridges and roads.

Covelli was a member of the Accademia Pontaniana, the Royal Academy of Sciences, the Gioenia Academy, and of several other scientific societies. Apart from geology he collected plants and maintained a herbarium. A square in Caiazzo is named after him as also a high school.
