= Hypogene =

Geologic processes which occur deep below the surface

In ore deposit geology, hypogene processes occur deep below the Earth's surface, and tend to form deposits of primary minerals, as opposed to supergene processes that occur at or near the surface, and tend to form secondary minerals.

At great depth the pressure is high, and water can remain liquid at temperatures well above 100 °C. Hot aqueous solutions originating from magmas, deep sedimentary basins, or areas of elevated geothermal gradients can contain metals and other ions derived from the magma itself or from leaching of sedimentary, igneous, or metamorphic rocks. Hypogene deposition processes include crystallization from the hot aqueous solutions flowing through the Earth's crust, driven by temperature and pressure gradients, as well as topographic, orogenic, and structural changes and/or controls.

Major dissolved components are chlorine, sodium, calcium, magnesium and potassium, and other important components include iron, manganese, copper, zinc, lead, sulfur (as SO^{2−}_{4} or S^{2−} or both) carbon (as HCO^{−}_{3} and CO_{2}) and nitrogen (as NH^{+}_{4}). Most ore fluids contain chloride as the dominant anion.

As the solutions rise the temperature and pressure fall. Eventually a point is reached where the minerals start to crystallise out. Minerals formed in this way are called primary, or hypogene, minerals. Sulfur is a common component of the fluids, and most of the common ore metals, lead, zinc, copper, silver, molybdenum and mercury, occur chiefly as sulfide and sulfosalt minerals. Examples of primary minerals formed in this way include the sulfide minerals pyrite (FeS_{2}), galena (PbS), sphalerite (ZnS), and chalcopyrite (CuFeS_{2}).

== Etymology ==
The word hypogene is derived from the Greek roots hypo- (ὑπο-) meaning 'under' and -gene (-γενής) meaning 'born' or 'produced'. The terms hypogene and supergene refer to the depth at which they occur.

== See also ==
- Supergene (geology)
