= Copper(II) selenide =

Names
- IUPAC name Copper(II) selenide
- Other names Cupric selenide

Identifiers
CAS Number	1317-41-5
3D model (JSmol)	Interactive image
ChemSpider	66608
ECHA InfoCard	100.013.885
EC Number	215-272-8
PubChem CID	73980
UNII	5TY4U83X24
CompTox Dashboard (EPA)	DTXSID501014324
- InChI: InChI=1S/Cu.Se Key: IRPLSAGFWHCJIQ-UHFFFAOYSA-N
- SMILES: [Cu].[Se]

Properties
Chemical formula	CuSe
Molar mass	142.517 g·mol^{−1}
Appearance	Black
Density	5.99 g/cm^{3}
Melting point	550 °C (1,022 °F; 823 K) (decomposes)

Hazards
- GHS labelling
Pictograms	(GHS06: Toxic) (GHS08: Health hazard) (GHS09: Environmental hazard)
Signal word	Danger
Hazard statements	H301, H331, H373, H410
Precautionary statements	P260, P264, P270, P271, P273, P301+P316, P304+P340, P316, P319, P321, P330, P391, P403+P233, P405, P501

Related compounds
Other anions	Copper(II) sulfate
Other cations	Copper(I) selenide; Gallium(II) selenide; Indium(III) selenide
Related compounds	Copper indium gallium selenide; Selenium dioxide; Selenous acid
- Except where otherwise noted, data are given for materials in their standard state (at 25 °C [77 °F], 100 kPa). Infobox references

Copper(II) selenide is an inorganic binary compound between copper and selenium, with the chemical formula CuSe.

== Properties ==
Copper(II) selenide is soluble in hydrochloric acid and sulfuric acid, evolving hydrogen selenide and sulfur dioxide respectively. It is oxidized to copper(II) selenite by nitric acid.

== Occurrence ==
Copper selenides are the most common selenium minerals. CuSe is known in mineralogy as klockmannite.

== Structure ==
Copper(II) selenide exhibits polymorphism. α-CuSe (klockmannite) is generally regarded as having a similar structure to CuS (covellite), but the precise structure could not be determined from powder diffraction data. γ-CuSe is stable above 393 K (120 °C; 248 °F) and is also hexagonal with similar unit cell dimensions (a = 3.984 Å, c = 17.288 Å at 430 K (157 °C; 314 °F)). The diffraction pattern is very similar to that of α-CuSe.

== Uses ==
Copper(II) selenide is produced in situ to form a protective black coating on iron or steel parts in some cold-bluing processes. Bluing solutions that operate in this manner will typically be labeled as containing selenous acid or selenium dioxide. It has also been investigated for use in the treatment of colon cancer.

== Related compounds ==
Other copper selenides have been characterized including Cu_{1.8}Se (non-stoichiometric), Cu_{3}Se_{2}, CuSe_{2} (low pressure modification), and CuSe_{2}II (high pressure modification). A copper iron selenide (CuFeSe_{2}) has also been characterized.
