= Copper ditelluride =

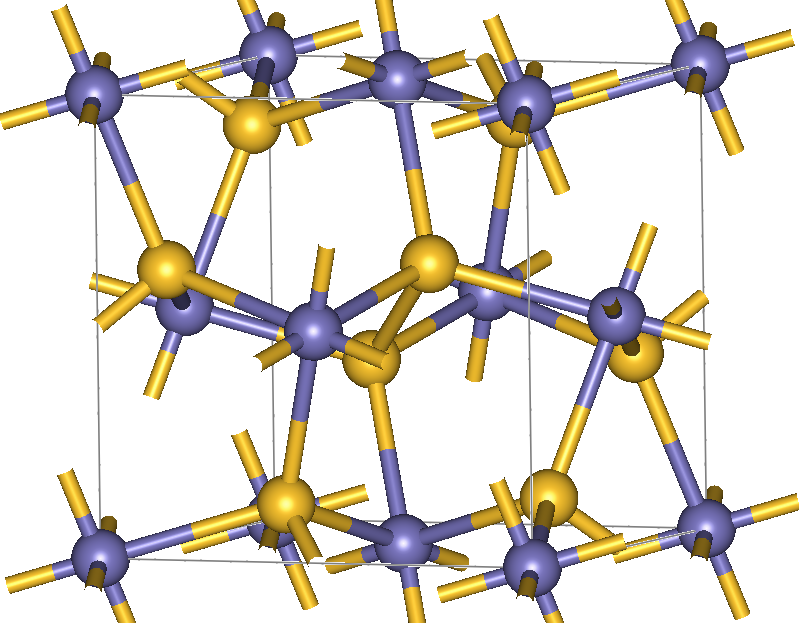

Names
- IUPAC name Copper ditelluride

Identifiers
| 3D model (JSmol) | Interactive image |
- InChI: InChI=1S/Cu.2H2Te/h;2*1H2 Key: DJSOPCKVPDZKBO-UHFFFAOYSA-N; InChI=1/Cu.2Te/rCuS2/c2-1-3
- SMILES: [Te][Cu][Te]

Properties
| Chemical formula | CuTe_{2} |
| Molar mass | 318.75 g·mol^{−1} |
| Solubility in water | insoluble |
| Magnetic susceptibility (χ) | −0.4×10^{−6} emu/g |

Structure
| Crystal structure | Cubic (pyrite), cP12 |
| Space group | Pa3̅ (No. 205) |
| Lattice constant | a = 0.66052 nm |
| Formula units (Z) | 4 |
- Except where otherwise noted, data are given for materials in their standard state (at 25 °C [77 °F], 100 kPa). Infobox references

Copper ditelluride is an inorganic compound with the chemical formula CuTe_{2}. It is a superconductor with a C18 structure and a transition temperature of 1.3 K. CuTe_{2} crystals can be synthesized by reacting elemental copper and tellurium with a molar ratio of 1:2 at a pressure of 65 kbar for 1–3 hours at 1000–1200 °C, followed by slow cooling.
