= Copper(I) telluride =

Names
- IUPAC name Copper(I) telluride

Identifiers
CAS Number	12019-52-2
3D model (JSmol)	Interactive image
ChemSpider	21170060
ECHA InfoCard	100.031.484
EC Number	234-646-1
PubChem CID	6914517
CompTox Dashboard (EPA)	DTXSID90893165
- InChI: InChI=1S/2Cu.Te Key: MZEWONGNQNXVKA-UHFFFAOYSA-N
- SMILES: [Cu][Te][Cu]

Properties
Chemical formula	Cu_{2}Te
Molar mass	254.69 g/mol
Appearance	Blue crystals
Density	4.6 g/cm^{3}
Melting point	1,127 °C (2,061 °F; 1,400 K)
Solubility in water	insoluble

Structure
Crystal structure	Hexagonal, hP6
Space group	P6/mmm (No. 191)
Lattice constant	a = 0.419 nm, c = 0.729 nm
Formula units (Z)	2
- Except where otherwise noted, data are given for materials in their standard state (at 25 °C [77 °F], 100 kPa). Infobox references

Copper(I) telluride is an inorganic compound with the chemical formula Cu_{2}Te. It can be synthesized by reacting elemental copper and tellurium with a molar ratio of 2:1 at 1200 °C in a vacuum. Cu_{2}Te has potential applications in thermoelectric elements and in solar cells, where it is alloyed with cadmium telluride to create a heterojunction.
