= Copper monosulfide =

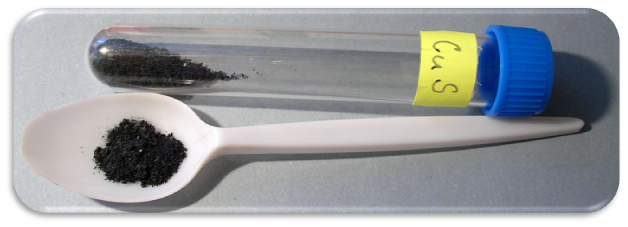

Names
- IUPAC name Copper sulfide
- Other names: Covellite; Copper(II) sulfide; Cupric sulfide

Identifiers
CAS Number	1317-40-4
3D model (JSmol)	Interactive image
ChemSpider	14145
ECHA InfoCard	100.013.884
EC Number	215-271-2
PubChem CID	14831
RTECS number	GL8912000
UNII	KL4YU612X7
CompTox Dashboard (EPA)	DTXSID601316949 DTXSID0061666, DTXSID601316949
- InChI: InChI=1S/Cu.S Key: BWFPGXWASODCHM-UHFFFAOYSA-N; InChI=1/Cu.S/rCuS/c1-2 Key: BWFPGXWASODCHM-BLKBWTQCAT
- SMILES: [Cu]=S

Properties
Chemical formula	CuS
Molar mass	95.61 g·mol^{−1}
Appearance	black hexagonal crystals
Density	4.76 g/cm^{3}
Melting point	507 °C (945 °F; 780 K) (transitions)
Solubility in water	3.3×10^{−5} g/100 ml (18 °C (64 °F))
Solubility product (K_{sp}) of CuS	6×10^{−37} (25 °C (77 °F))
Magnetic susceptibility (χ)	−2.0×10^{−6} cm^{3}/mol
Refractive index (n_{D})	1.45

Structure
Crystal structure	hexagonal

Thermochemistry
Heat capacity (C)	47.8 J⋅mol^{−1}·K^{-1}
Std molar entropy (S^{⦵}_{298})	66.5 J⋅mol^{−1}·K^{-1}
Std enthalpy of formation (Δ_{f}H^{⦵}_{298})	−53.1 kJ⋅mol^{−1}
Gibbs free energy (Δ_{f}G^{⦵})	−53.6 kJ⋅mol^{−1}

Hazards
- NIOSH (US health exposure limits)
PEL (Permissible)	TWA 1 mg/m^{3} (as Cu)
REL (Recommended)	TWA 1 mg/m^{3} (as Cu)
IDLH (Immediate danger)	TWA 100 mg/m^{3} (as Cu)

Related compounds
Other anions	Copper(II) bromide; Copper(II) chloride; Copper(II) fluoride; Copper(II) oxide; Copper(II) selenide
Other cations	Cadmium(II) sulfide; Iron(II) sulfide; Lead(II) sulfide; Manganese(II) sulfide; Mercury(II) sulfide; Tin(II) sulfide; Zinc sulfide
- Except where otherwise noted, data are given for materials in their standard state (at 25 °C [77 °F], 100 kPa). verify (what is ?) Infobox references

Copper monosulfide is a chemical compound of copper and sulfur with the empirical formula CuS. It occurs in nature as the dark indigo blue mineral covellite. It is one of a number of binary compounds of copper and sulfur (see copper sulfide for an overview of this subject), and has attracted interest because of its potential uses in catalysis and photovoltaics. It is a moderate conductor of electricity.

== Manufacturing ==
A black colloidal precipitate of copper monosulfide is formed when hydrogen sulfide (H_{2}S) is bubbled through solutions of Cu(II) salts. This is the basis of its industrial production.

Special forms of CuS for certain applications can be prepared by melting an excess of sulfur with copper(I) sulfide or by precipitation with hydrogen sulfide from a solution of anhydrous copper(II) chloride in anhydrous ethanol. Nanoparticles of CuS can be prepared by reaction of dissolved copper(II) chloride with thioglycolic acid.

The reaction of copper with molten sulfur followed by boiling sodium hydroxide and the reaction of sodium sulfide with aqueous copper sulfate will also produce copper sulfide.

== CuS structure and bonding ==
Copper sulfide crystallizes in the hexagonal crystal system, and this is the form of the mineral covellite. There is also an amorphous high pressure form, which on the basis of the Raman spectrum has been described as having a distorted covellite structure. An amorphous room temperature semiconducting form produced by the reaction of a Cu(II) ethylenediamine complex with thiourea has been reported, which transforms to the crystalline covellite form at 30 °C (86 °F).

The crystal structure of covellite has been reported several times, and whilst these studies are in general agreement on assigning the space group P6_{3}/mmc there are small discrepancies in bond lengths and angles between them. The structure was described as "extraordinary" by Wells and is quite different from Copper(II) oxide, but similar to Copper(II) selenide (referred to as Klockmannite). The covellite unit cell contains 6 formula units (12 atoms) in which:

- 4 Cu atoms have tetrahedral coordination (see illustration).
- 2 Cu atoms have trigonal planar coordination (see illustration).
- 2 pairs of S atoms are only 207.1 picometers apart indicating the existence of an S-S bond (a disulfide unit).
- the 2 remaining S atoms form trigonal planar triangles around the copper atoms, and are surrounded by five Cu atoms in a pentagonal bipyramid (see illustration).
- The S atoms at each end of a disulfide unit are tetrahedrally coordinated to 3 tetrahedrally coordinated Cu atoms and the other S atom in the disulfide unit (see illustration).

The formulation of copper sulfide as Cu^{II}S (i.e. containing no sulfur-sulfur bond) is clearly incompatible with the crystal structure, and also at variance with the observed diamagnetism as a Cu(II) compound would have a d^{9} configuration and be expected to be paramagnetic.

Studies using X-ray photoelectron spectroscopy (XPS) indicate that all of the copper atoms have an oxidation state of +1. This contradicts a formulation based on the crystal structure and obeying the octet rule that is found in many textbooks (e.g.) describing CuS as containing both Cu^{I} and Cu^{II} i.e. (Cu^{+})_{2}Cu^{2+}(S_{2})^{2−}S^{2−}. An alternative formulation as (Cu^{+})_{3}(S^{2−})(S_{2})^{−} was proposed and supported by calculations. The formulation should not be interpreted as containing radical anion, but rather that there is a delocalized valence "hole". Electron paramagnetic resonance studies on the precipitation of Cu(II) salts indicates that the reduction of Cu(II) to Cu(I) occurs in solution.

Local structures in covellite
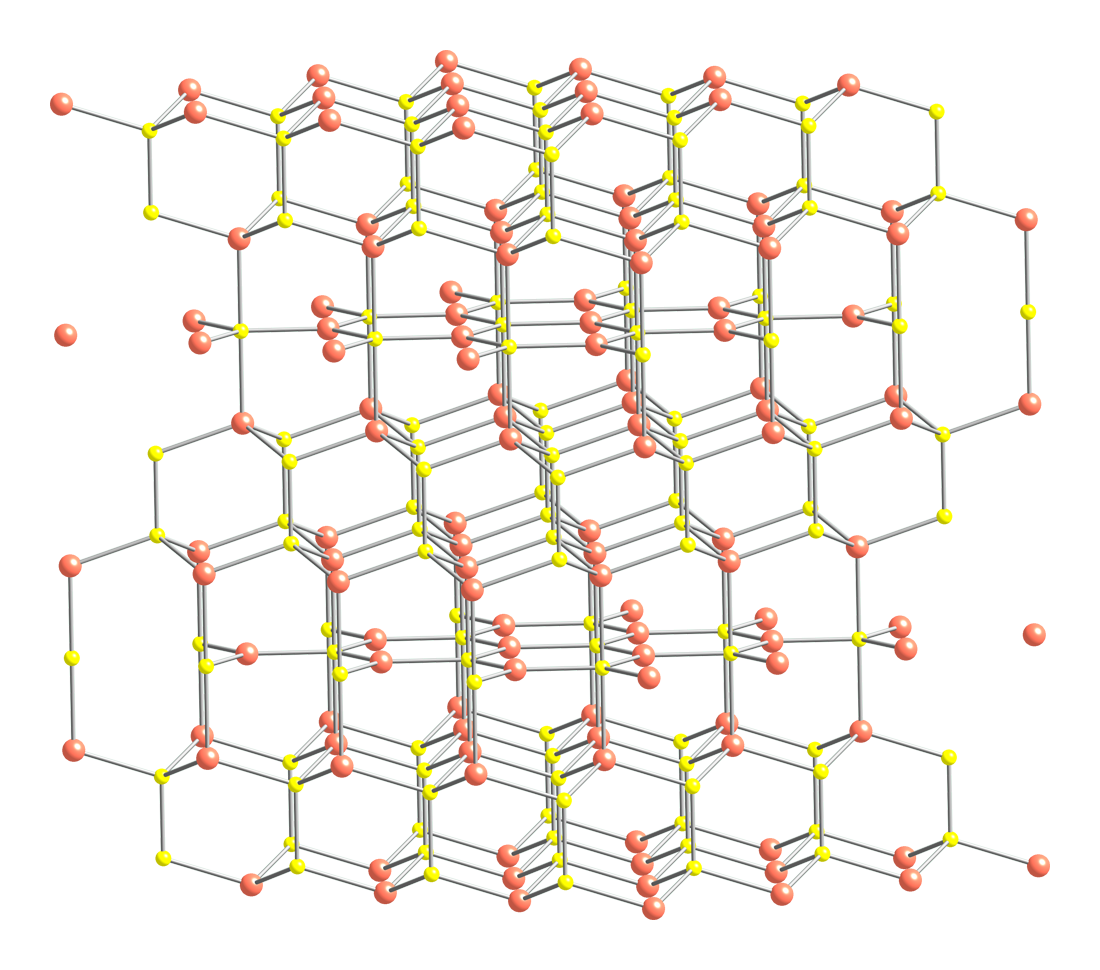
ball-and-stick model of part of the crystal structure of covellite

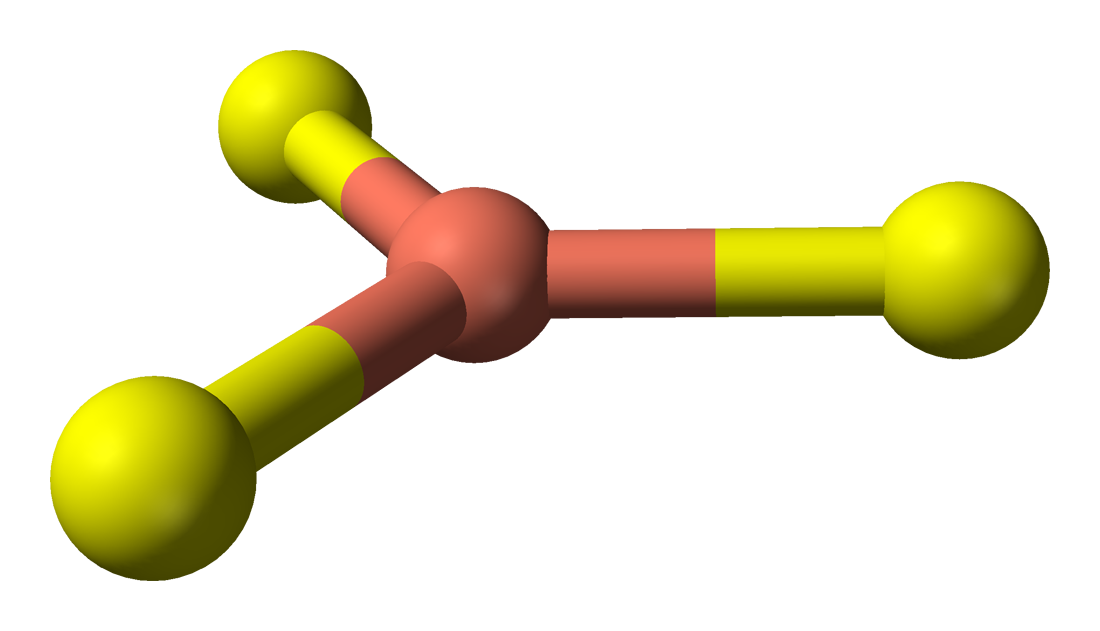
trigonal planar coordination of copper

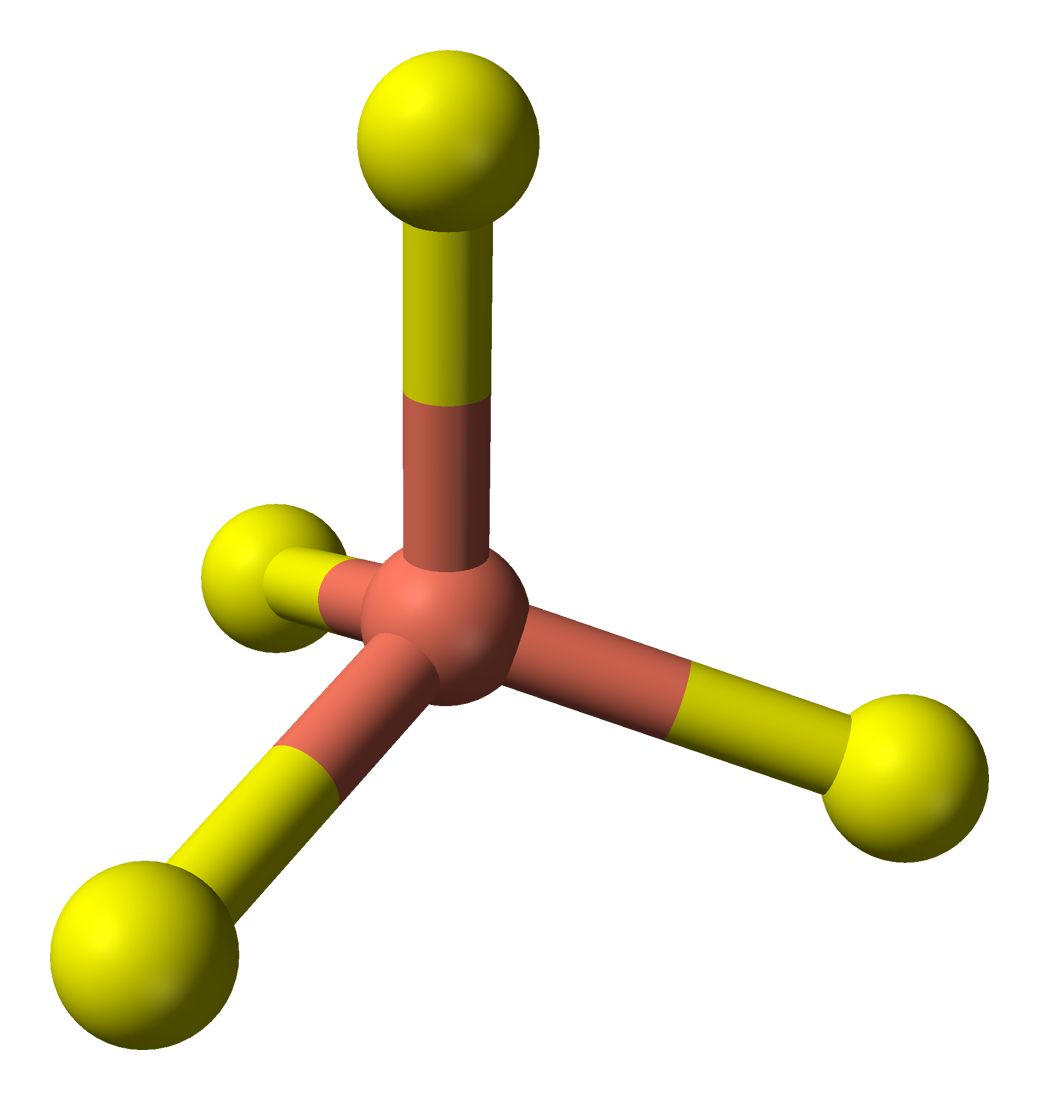
tetrahedral coordination of copper

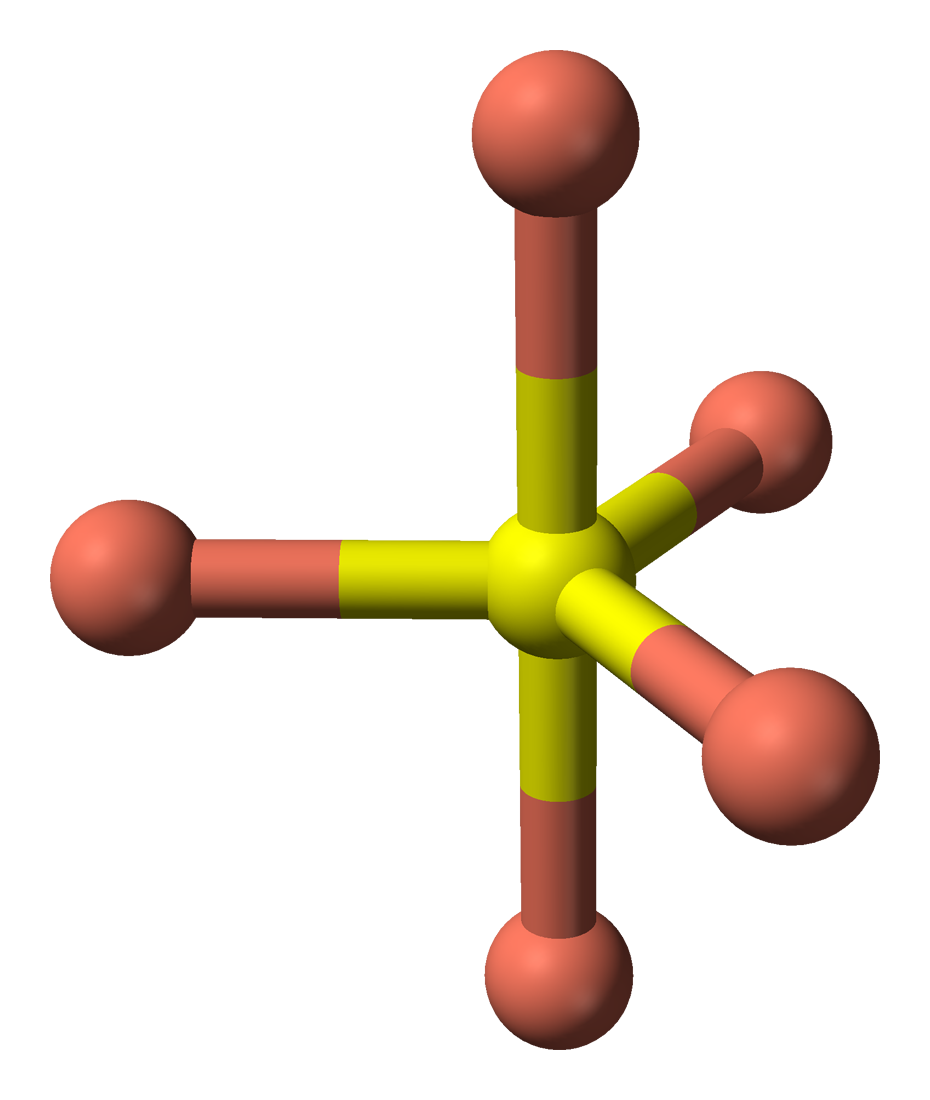
trigonal bipyramidal coordination of sulfur

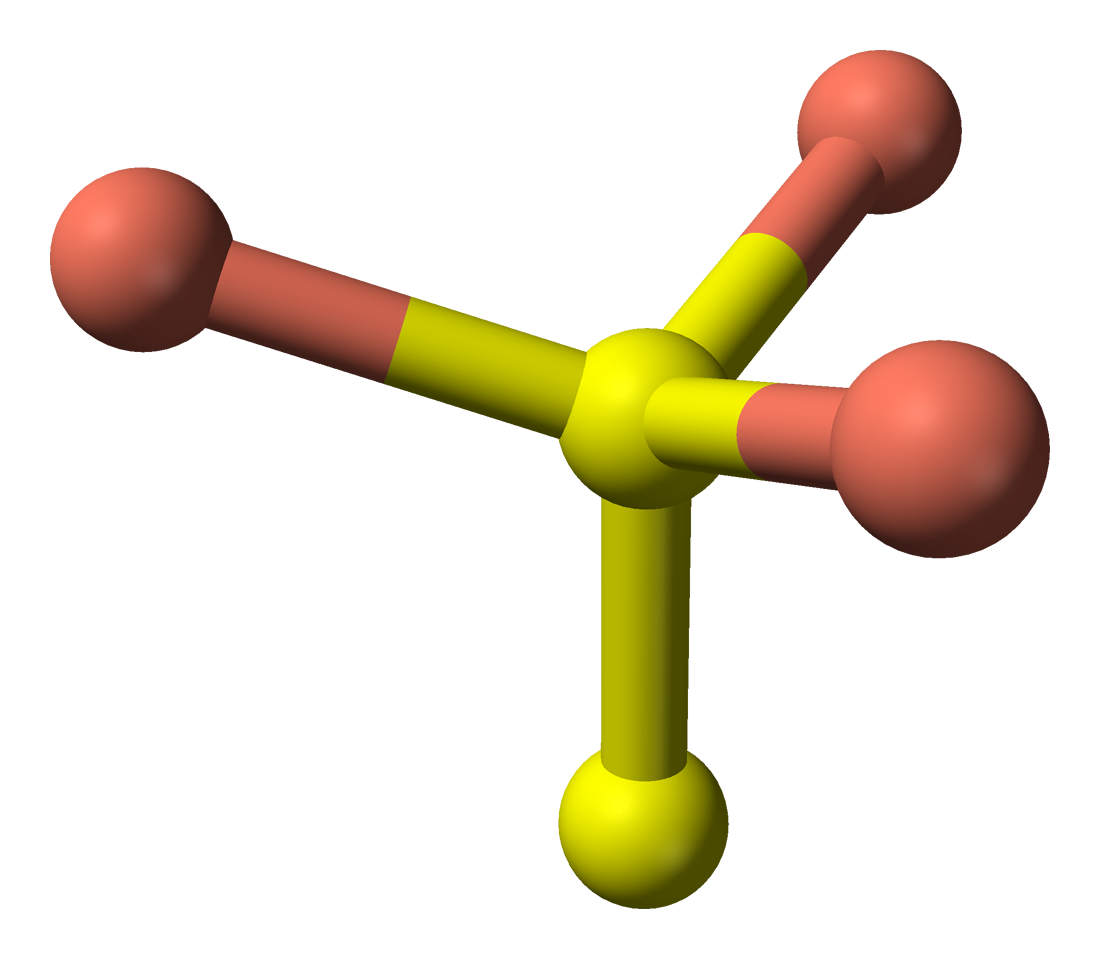
coordination of sulfur-note disulfide unit

== See also ==
- Copper sulfide for an overview of all copper sulfide phases
- Copper(I) sulfide (Cu_{2}S)
- Covellite
