= Copper(I) selenide =

Names
- IUPAC name Copper(I) selenide
- Other names Cuprous selenide, dicopper selenide

Identifiers
CAS Number	20405-64-5
3D model (JSmol)	Interactive image
ChemSpider	21170409
ECHA InfoCard	100.039.799
EC Number	243-796-7
PubChem CID	6914519
UNII	44P3QN57K9
CompTox Dashboard (EPA)	DTXSID6066606
- InChI: InChI=1S/2Cu.Se Key: KTLOQXXVQYUCJU-UHFFFAOYSA-N
- SMILES: [Cu].[Cu].[Se]

Properties
Chemical formula	Cu_{2}Se
Molar mass	206.063 g·mol^{−1}
Appearance	Dark blue, black
Density	6.84 g/mL

Hazards
- GHS labelling
Pictograms	(GHS06: Toxic) (GHS08: Health hazard) (GHS09: Environmental hazard)
Signal word	Danger
Hazard statements	H201, H331, H373, H410
Precautionary statements	P260, P264, P270, P271, P273, P301+P310, P304+P340, P311, P314, P321, P330, P391, P403+P233, P405, P501

Related compounds
Other cations	Copper(II) selenide; Gallium(II) selenide; Indium(III) selenide
Related compounds	Copper indium gallium selenide
- Except where otherwise noted, data are given for materials in their standard state (at 25 °C [77 °F], 100 kPa). Infobox references

Copper(I) selenide is an inorganic binary compound between copper and selenium, with the chemical formula Cu_{2}Se.

== Properties ==
Stoichiometric copper selenide is a zero-bandgap material with metal-like behavior. Copper-deficient Cu_{2−x}Se (non-stoichiometric) is an intrinsic p-type semiconductor with direct and indirect bandgap energies in the range of 2.1–2.3 eV and 1.2–1.4 eV respectively. It is frequently grown as nanoparticles or other nanostructures.

== Occurrence ==
Copper selenides are the most common selenium minerals. Cu_{2}Se occurs as two polymorphs: berzelianite (isometric, more common) and bellidoite (tetragonal). Other copper selenide minerals include umangite, Cu_{3}Se_{2} and athabascaite, Cu_{5}Se_{4}.

== Uses ==
Copper(I) selenide is produced in situ to form a protective black coating on iron or steel parts in some cold-bluing processes. Bluing solutions that operate in this manner will typically be labeled as containing selenous acid or selenium dioxide. It has also been investigated for use in the treatment of colon cancer.
