= Anilite =

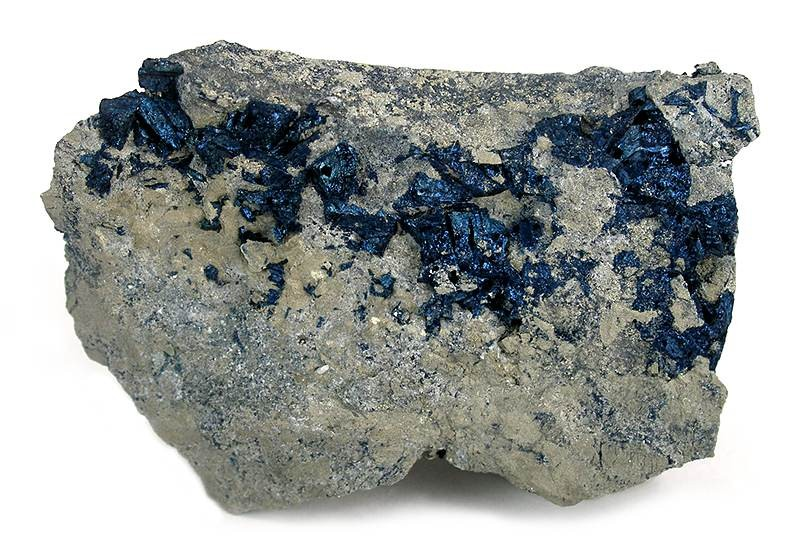
- A sample of anilite found in Serbia

General
- Category: Minerals
- Formula: Cu_{7}S_{4}

Anilite (IMA symbol: Ani) is a mineral with the chemical formula Cu_{7}S_{4}. It is named for its type locality, the Ani Mine in Akita Prefecture.
