= Chalcocite =

Sulfide mineral

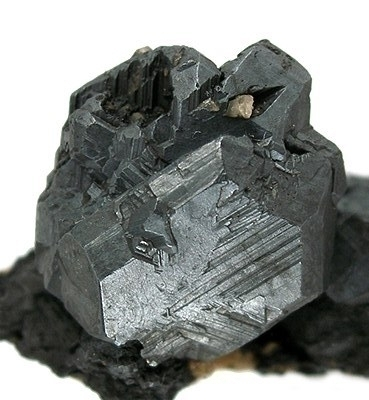
- Chalcocite from Cornwall

General
- Category: Sulfide minerals
- Formula: copper(I) sulfide: Cu_{2}S
- IMA symbol: Cc
- Strunz classification: 2.BA.05a
- Crystal system: Monoclinic
- Crystal class: Prismatic (2/m) (same H-M symbol)
- Space group: P2_{1}/c
- Unit cell: a = 15.246(4) Å, b = 11.884(2) Å, c = 13.494(3) Å; β = 116.35(1)°; Z = 48

Identification
- Color: Dark gray to black
- Crystal habit: Tabular to prismatic crystals also massive to granular, (pseudo-orthorhombic)
- Twinning: Common on {110} yielding pseudohexagonal stellate forms
- Cleavage: Indistinct on {110}
- Fracture: Conchoidal
- Tenacity: Brittle to sectile
- Mohs scale hardness: 2 1/2–3
- Luster: Metallic
- Streak: Shiny black to lead gray
- Diaphaneity: Opaque
- Specific gravity: 5.5–5.8
- Fusibility: 2–2.5

Chalcocite (/ˈkælkəˌsaɪt/), copper(I) sulfide (Cu_{2}S), is a copper ore mineral. It is opaque and dark gray to black, with a metallic luster. It has a hardness of 2.5–3 on the Mohs scale. It is a sulfide with a monoclinic crystal system.

The term chalcocite from the Greek khalkos, meaning "copper". It is also known as redruthite, vitreous copper, or copper-glance.

== Occurrence ==
Chalcocite is sometimes found as a primary vein mineral in hydrothermal veins. However, most chalcocite occurs in the supergene enriched environment below the oxidation zone of copper deposits as a result of the leaching of copper from the oxidized minerals. It is also often found in sedimentary rocks.

It has been mined for centuries and is one of the most profitable copper ores. The reasons for this is its high copper content (66.7% atomic ratio and nearly 80% by weight) and the ease at which copper can be separated from sulfur.

Since chalcocite is a secondary mineral that forms from the alteration of other minerals, it has been known to form pseudomorphs of many different minerals. A pseudomorph is a mineral that has replaced another mineral atom by atom, but it leaves the original mineral's crystal shape intact. Chalcocite has been known to form pseudomorphs of the minerals bornite, covellite, chalcopyrite, pyrite, enargite, millerite, galena and sphalerite.

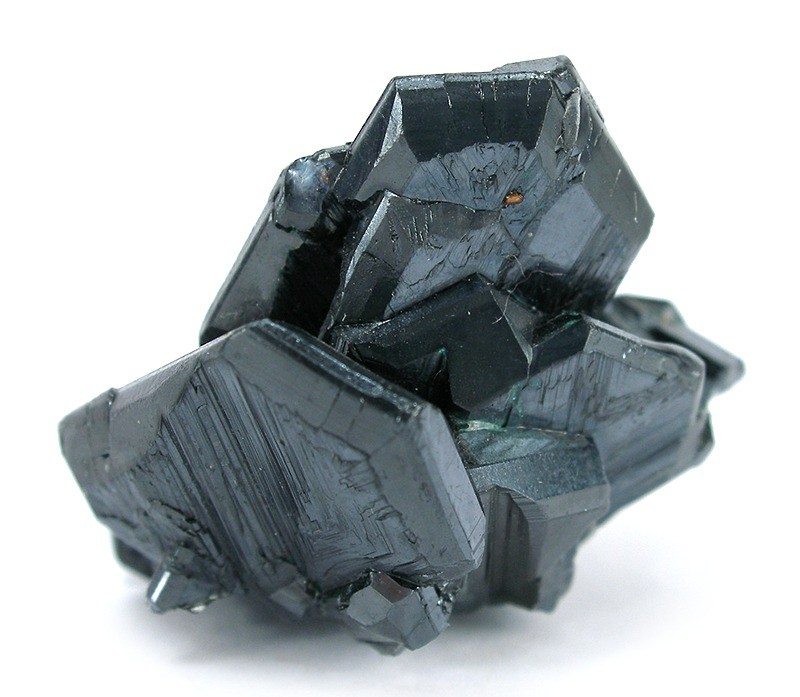
Chalcocite crystals from the Mammoth Mine, Mount Isa – Cloncurry area, Queensland, Australia (size: 3.0 x 2.9 x 2.4 cm)

== See also ==
- Copper(I) sulfide
- Copper monosulfide
