= Covellite =

Sulfide mineral

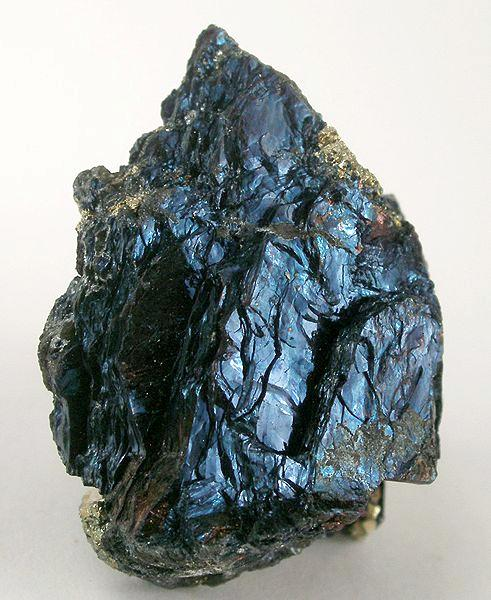

General
- Category: Sulfide mineral
- Formula: CuS (copper monosulfide)
- IMA symbol: Cv
- Strunz classification: 2.CA.05a
- Dana classification: 02.08.12.01
- Crystal system: Hexagonal
- Crystal class: Dihexagonal dipyramidal (6/mmm); H–M Symbol (6/m 2/m 2/m)
- Space group: P6_{3}/mmc
- Unit cell: a = 3.7938 Å, c = 16.341 Å; Z = 6

Identification
- Color: Indigo-blue or darker, commonly highly iridescent, brass-yellow to deep red
- Crystal habit: Thin platy hexagonal crystals and rosettes also massive to granular.
- Cleavage: Perfect on {0001}
- Tenacity: Flexible
- Mohs scale hardness: 1.5–2
- Luster: Submetallic, inclining to resinous to dull
- Streak: Lead gray
- Diaphaneity: Opaque
- Specific gravity: 4.6–4.8
- Optical properties: Uniaxial (+)
- Refractive index: n_{ω} = 1.450 n_{ε} = 2.620
- Pleochroism: Marked, deep blue to pale blue
- Fusibility: 2.5
- Other characteristics: Micaceous cleavage

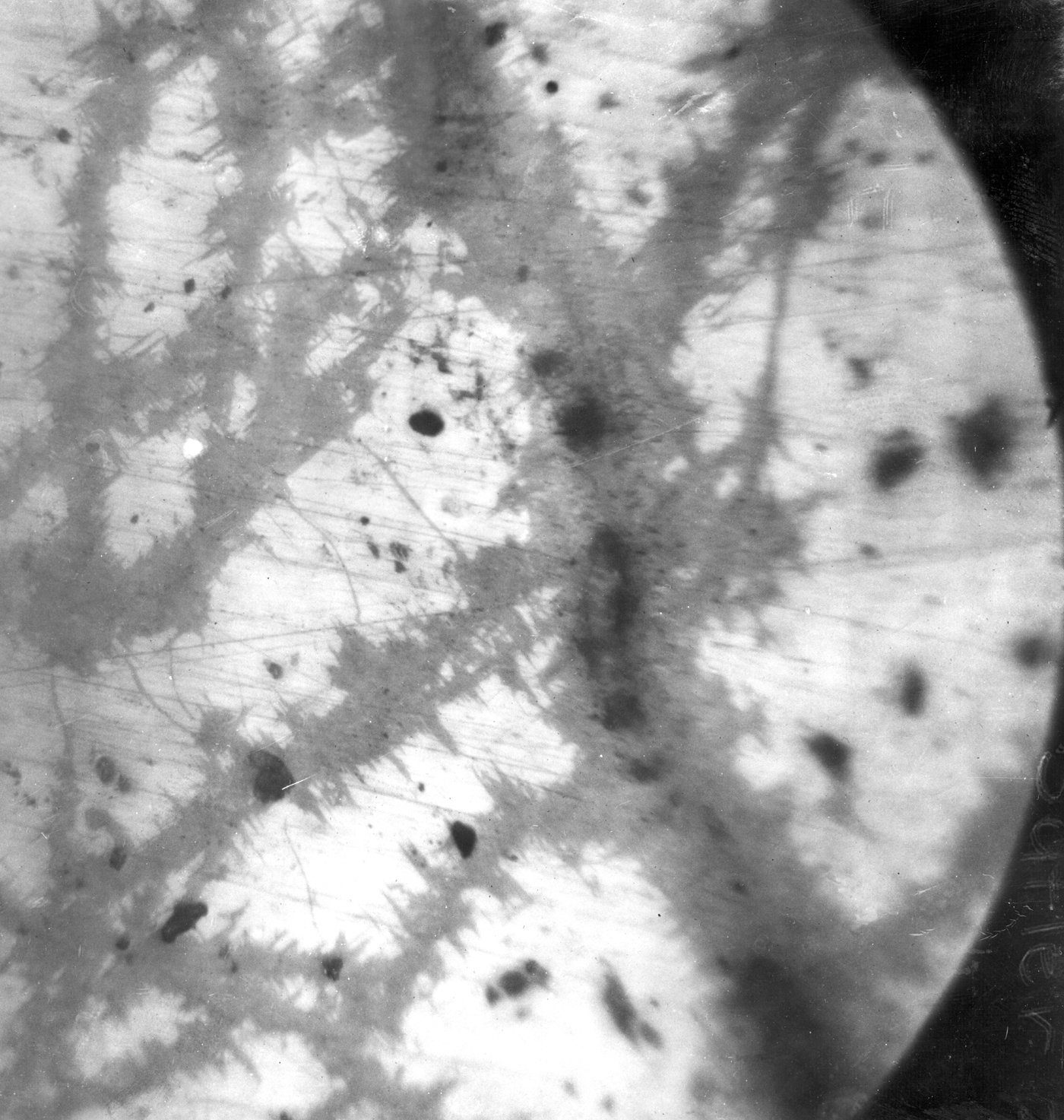
Covellite (gray) replacing and embaying chalcopyrite (light), polished section from Horn Silver Mine, San Francisco Mining District, Utah. Enlarged to 210 diameters.

Covellite (also known as covelline) is a rare copper sulfide mineral with the formula CuS. This indigo blue mineral is commonly a secondary mineral in limited abundance and although it is not an important ore of copper itself, it is well known to mineral collectors.

The mineral is generally found in zones of secondary enrichment (supergene) of copper sulfide deposits. Commonly found as coatings on chalcocite, chalcopyrite, bornite, enargite, pyrite, and other sulfides, it often occurs as pseudomorphic replacements of other minerals. The first records are from Mount Vesuvius, formally named in 1832 after Nicola Covelli.

== Composition ==
Covellite belongs to the binary copper sulfides group, which has the formula Cu_{x}S_{y} and can have a wide-ranging copper/sulfur ratio, from 1:2 to 2:1 (Cu/S). However, this series is by no means continuous and the homogeneity range of covellite CuS is narrow. Materials rich in sulfur CuS_{x} where x~ 1.1- 1.2 do exist, but they exhibit "superstructures", a modulation of the hexagonal ground plane of the structure spanning a number of adjacent unit cells. This indicates that several of covellite's special properties are the result of molecular structure at this level.

As described for copper monosulfide, the assignment of formal oxidation states to the atoms that constitute covellite is deceptive. The formula might seem to suggest the description Cu^{2+}, S^{2−}. In fact the atomic structure shows that copper and sulfur each adopt two different geometries. However photoelectron spectroscopy, magnetic, and electrical properties all indicate the absence of Cu^{2+} (d^{9}) ions. In contrast to the oxide CuO, the material is not a magnetic semiconductor but a metallic conductor with weak Pauli-paramagnetism. Thus, the mineral is better described as consisting of Cu^{+} and S^{−} rather than Cu^{2+} and S^{2−}. Compared to pyrite with a non-closed shell of S^{−} pairing to form S^{2−}_{2}, there are only 2/3 of the sulfur atoms held. The other 1/3 remains unpaired and together with Cu atoms forms hexagonal layers reminiscent of the boron nitride (graphite structure). Thus, a description Cu^{+}_{3}S^{−}S^{2−}_{2} would seem appropriate with a delocalized hole in the valence band leading to metallic conductivity. Subsequent band structure calculations indicate however that the hole is more localized on the sulfur pairs than on the unpaired sulfur. This means that Cu^{+}_{3}S^{2−}S^{−}_{2} with a mixed sulfur oxidation state −2 and −1/2 is more appropriate. Others have come up with variations, such as Cu^{+}_{4}Cu^{2+}_{2}(S_{2})_{2}S_{2}.

== Structure ==
For a copper sulfide, covellite has a complicated lamellar structure, with alternating layers of CuS and Cu_{2}S_{2} with copper atoms of trigonal planar (uncommon) and tetrahedral coordination respectively. The layers are connected by S-S bonds (based on Van der Waals forces) known as S_{2} dimers. The Cu_{2}S_{2} layers only have one l/3 bond along the c-axis (perpendicular to layers), thus only one bond in that direction to create a perfect cleavage {0001}. The conductivity is greater across layers due to the partially filled 3p orbitals, facilitating electron mobility.

== Formation ==
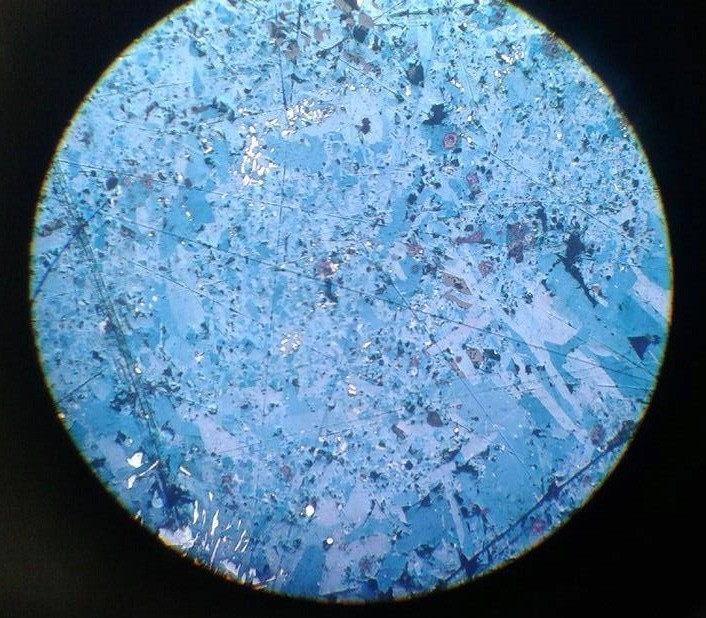
A microscopic picture of covellite

=== Naturally occurring ===
Covellite is commonly found as a secondary copper mineral in deposits. Covellite is known to form in weathering environments in surficial deposits where copper is the primary sulfide. As a primary mineral, the formation of covellite is restricted to hydrothermal conditions, thus rarely found as such in copper ore deposits or as a volcanic sublimate.

=== Synthetic ===
Covellite's unique crystal structure is related to its complex oxidative formation conditions, as seen when attempting to synthesize covellite. Its formation also depends on the state and history of the associated sulfides it was derived from. Experimental evidence shows ammonium metavanadate (NH_{4}VO_{3}) to be a potentially important catalyst for covellite's solid state transformation from other copper sulfides. Researchers discovered that covellite can also be produced in the lab under anaerobic conditions by sulfate reducing bacteria at a variety of temperatures. However, further research remains, because although the abundance of covellite may be high, the growth of its crystal size is actually inhibited by physical constraints of the bacteria. It has been experimentally demonstrated that the presence of ammonium vanadates is important in the solid state transformation of other copper sulfides to covellite crystals.

== Occurrence ==
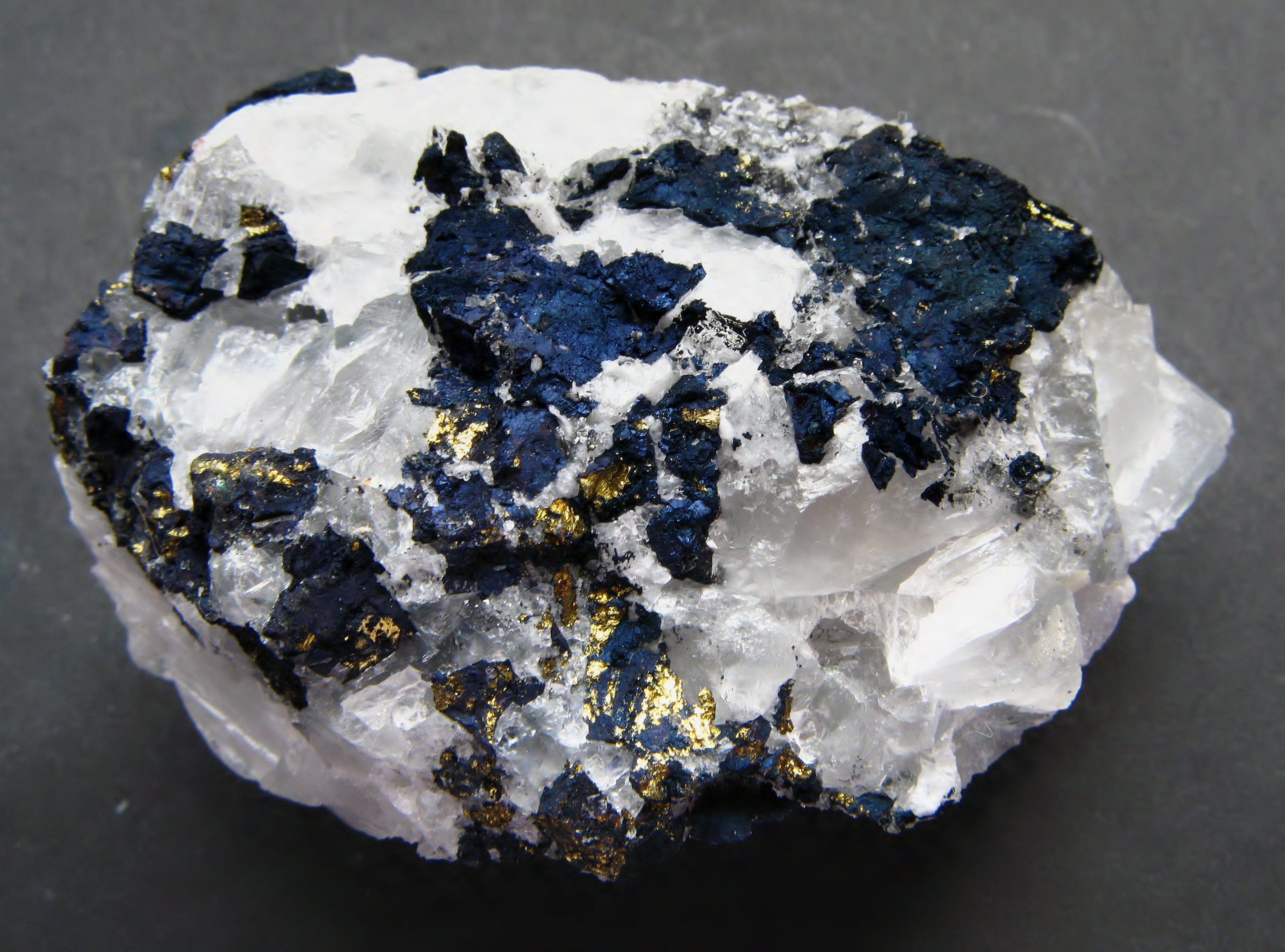
Covellite from the Black Forest, Germany

Covellite's occurrence is widespread around the world, with a significant number of localities in Central Europe, China, Australia, Western United States, and Argentina. Many are found close to orogenic belts, where orographic precipitation often plays a role in weathering. An example of primary mineral formation is in hydrothermal veins at depths of 1,150 metres (3,770 ft) found in Silver Bow County, Montana. As a secondary mineral, covellite also forms as descending surface water in the supergene enrichment zone oxidizes and redeposits covellite on hypogene sulfides (pyrite and chalcopyrite) at the same locality. An unusual occurrence of covellite was found replacing organic debris in the red beds of New Mexico.

Nicola Covelli (1790-1829), the discoverer of the mineral, was a professor of botany and chemistry though was interested in geology and volcanology, particularly Mount Vesuvius' eruptions. His studies of its lava led to the discovery of several unknown minerals including covellite.

== Applications ==
=== Superconductors ===
Covellite is a superconductor with a critical temperature is 1.6 K. The framework of CuS_{3} / CuS_{2} allow for an electron excess that facilitate superconduction during particular states, with exceptionally low thermal loss. Material science is now aware of several of covellite's favorable properties and several researchers are intent on synthesizing covellite. Uses of covellite CuS superconductivity research can be seen in lithium battery cathodes, ammonia gas sensors, and solar electric devices with metal chalcogenide thin films.

=== Lithium ion batteries ===
Research into alternate cathode material for lithium batteries often examines the complex variations in stoichiometry and tetrahedron layered structure of copper sulfides. Advantages include limited toxicity and low costs. The high electrical conductivity of covellite (10×10^{−3} S/cm) and a high theoretical capacity (560 mAh/g) with flat discharge curves when cycled versus Li+/Li have been determined to play critical roles for capacity. The variety of methods of formation is also a factor of the low costs. However, issues with cycle stability and kinetics have been limiting the progress of utilizing covellite in mainstream lithium batteries until advances in research occur.

=== Nanostructures ===
The electron mobility and free hole density characteristics of covellite makes it an attractive choice for nanoplatelets and nanocrystals because they provide the structures the ability to vary in size. However, this ability can be limited by the plate-like structure all copper sulfides possess. Its anisotropic electrical conductivity has been experimentally proven to be greater within layers (i.e. perpendicular to c-axis). Researchers have shown that covellite nanoplatelets of approx. 2 nm thick, with one unit cell and two copper atom layers, and diameters around 100 nm are ideal dimensions for electrocatalysts in oxygen reduction reactions (ORR). The basal planes experience preferential oxygen adsorption and larger surface area facilitates electron transfer. In contrast, with ambient conditions, nanoplatelets of dimensions of 4 nm width and greater than 30 nm diameter have been experimentally synthesized with less cost and energy. Localized surface plasmon resonances observed in covellite nanoparticles have recently been linked to the stoichiometry-dependent band gap key for nanocrystals. Thus, future chemical sensing devices, electronics, and other instruments which utilize nanostructures of covellite CuS are being explored.

== See also ==
- List of minerals
- List of minerals named after people
