= Chalcopyrite =

Copper iron sulfide mineral

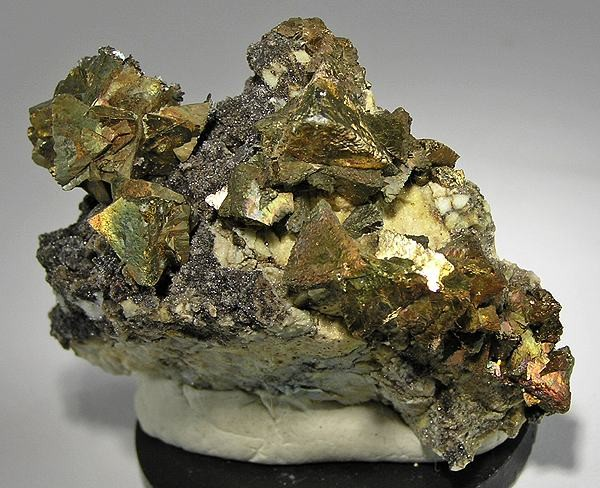

General
- Category: Sulfide mineral
- Formula: CuFeS_{2}
- IMA symbol: Ccp
- Strunz classification: 2.CB.10a
- Crystal system: Tetragonal
- Crystal class: Scalenohedral (4̅2m); H-M symbol: (4̅ 2m)
- Space group: I4̅2d
- Unit cell: a = 5.289 Å, c = 10.423 Å; Z = 4

Identification
- Formula mass: 183.54 g/mol
- Color: Brass yellow, may have iridescent purplish tarnish.
- Crystal habit: Predominantly the disphenoid and resembles a tetrahedron, commonly massive, and sometimes botryoidal.
- Twinning: Penetration twins
- Cleavage: Indistinct on {011}
- Fracture: Irregular to uneven
- Tenacity: Brittle
- Mohs scale hardness: 3.5–4
- Luster: Metallic
- Streak: Greenish black
- Diaphaneity: Opaque
- Specific gravity: 4.1–4.3
- Optical properties: Opaque
- Solubility: Soluble in HNO_{3}
- Other characteristics: magnetic on heating

Chalcopyrite (/ˌkælkəˈpaɪˌraɪt, -koʊ-/ KAL-kə-PY-ryte, -koh-) is a sulfide mineral composed of copper and iron, and the most abundant copper ore mineral. It has the chemical formula CuFeS_{2} and crystallizes in the tetragonal system. It has a brassy to golden yellow color and a hardness of 3.5 to 4 on the Mohs scale. Its streak is diagnostic as green-tinged black.

On exposure to air, chalcopyrite tarnishes to a variety of oxides, hydroxides, and sulfates. Associated copper minerals include the sulfides bornite (Cu_{5}FeS_{4}), chalcocite (Cu_{2}S), covellite (CuS), digenite (Cu_{9}S_{5}); carbonates such as malachite and azurite, and rarely oxides such as cuprite (Cu_{2}O). It is rarely found in association with native copper. Chalcopyrite is a conductor of electricity.

Copper can be extracted from chalcopyrite ore using various methods. The two predominant methods are pyrometallurgy and hydrometallurgy, the former being the most commercially viable.

== Etymology ==
The name chalcopyrite comes from the Greek words chalkos, which means copper, and pyrites, which means striking fire. It was sometimes historically referred to as "yellow copper".

== Identification ==
Chalcopyrite is often confused with pyrite and gold since all three of these minerals have a yellowish color and a metallic luster. Some important mineral characteristics that help distinguish these minerals are hardness and streak. Chalcopyrite is much softer than pyrite and can be scratched with a knife, whereas pyrite cannot be scratched by a knife. However, chalcopyrite is harder than gold, which, if pure, can be scratched by copper. Additionally, gold is malleable, while chalcopyrite is brittle. Chalcopyrite has a distinctive black streak with green flecks in it. Pyrite has a black streak and gold has a yellow streak.

== Chemistry ==
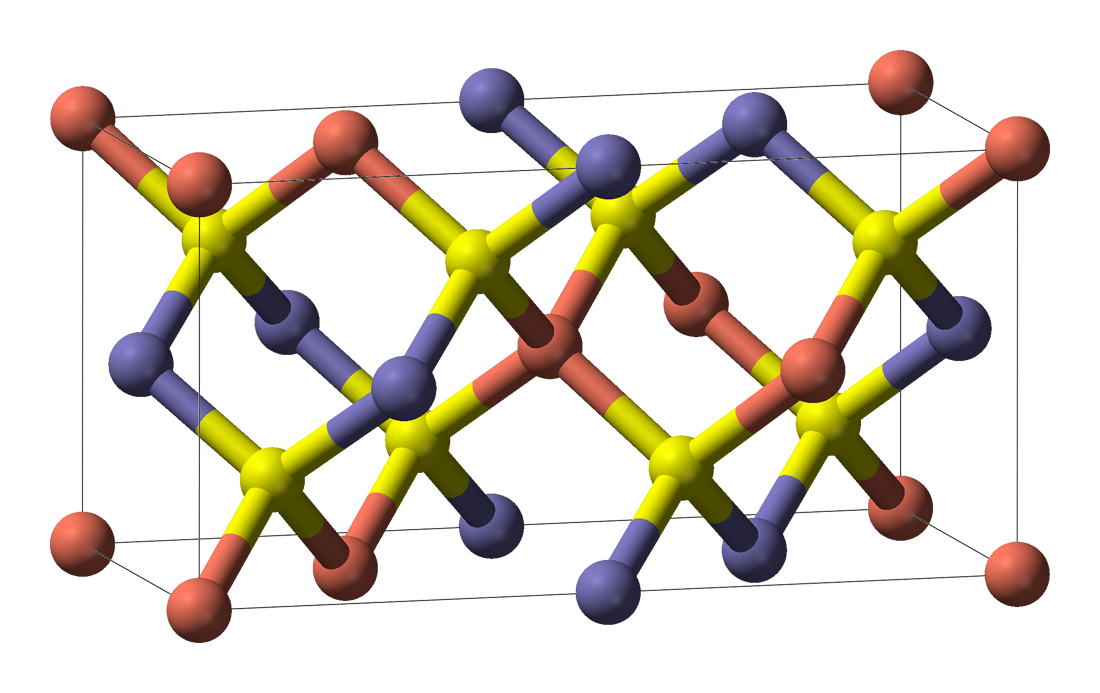
The unit cell of chalcopyrite. Copper is shown in pink, iron in blue and sulfur in yellow.

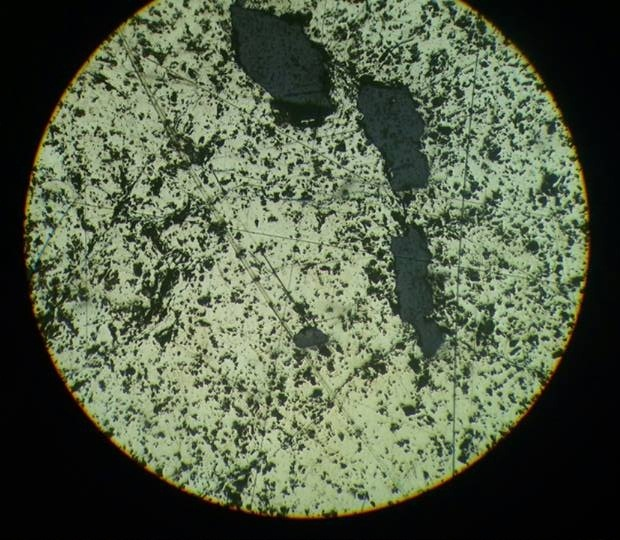
Microscopic picture of chalcopyrite

Natural chalcopyrite has no solid solution series with any other sulfide minerals. There is limited substitution of zinc with copper despite chalcopyrite having the same crystal structure as sphalerite.

Minor amounts of elements such as silver, gold, cadmium, cobalt, nickel, lead, tin, and zinc can be measured (at parts per million levels), likely substituting for copper and iron. Selenium, bismuth, tellurium, and arsenic may substitute for sulfur in minor amounts. Chalcopyrite can be oxidized to form malachite, azurite, and cuprite.

== Structure ==
Chalcopyrite is a member of the tetragonal crystal system. Crystallographically the structure of chalcopyrite is closely related to that of zinc blende ZnS (sphalerite). The unit cell is twice as large, reflecting an alternation of Cu^{+} and Fe^{3+} ions replacing Zn^{2+} ions in adjacent cells. In contrast to the pyrite structure chalcopyrite has single S^{2−} sulfide anions rather than disulfide pairs. Another difference is that the iron cation is not diamagnetic low spin Fe(II) as in pyrite.

In the crystal structure, each metal ion is tetrahedrally coordinated to 4 sulfur anions. Each sulfur anion is bonded to two copper atoms and two iron atoms.

== Paragenesis ==
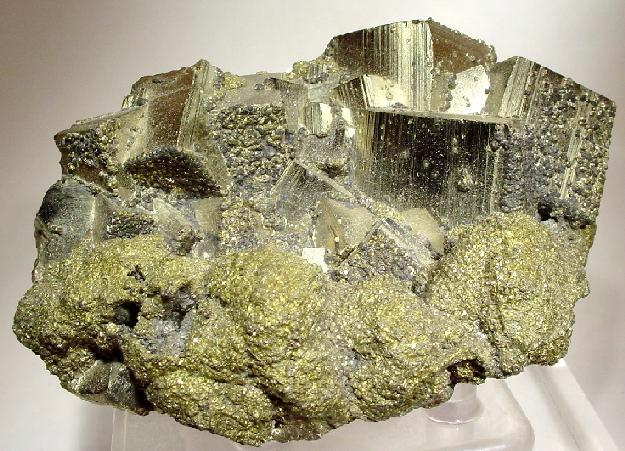
Brass-yellow chalcopyrite crystals below large striated pyrite cubes

Chalcopyrite is present with many ore-bearing environments via a variety of ore forming processes.

Chalcopyrite is present in volcanogenic massive sulfide ore deposits and sedimentary exhalative deposits, formed by deposition of copper during hydrothermal circulation. Chalcopyrite is concentrated in this environment via fluid transport. Porphyry copper ore deposits are formed by concentration of copper within a granitic stock during the ascent and crystallisation of a magma. Chalcopyrite in this environment is produced by concentration within a magmatic system.

Chalcopyrite is an accessory mineral in Kambalda type komatiitic nickel ore deposits, formed from an immiscible sulfide liquid in sulfide-saturated ultramafic lavas. In this environment chalcopyrite is formed by a sulfide liquid stripping copper from an immiscible silicate liquid.

Chalcopyrite has been the most important ore of copper since the Bronze Age.

== Occurrence ==
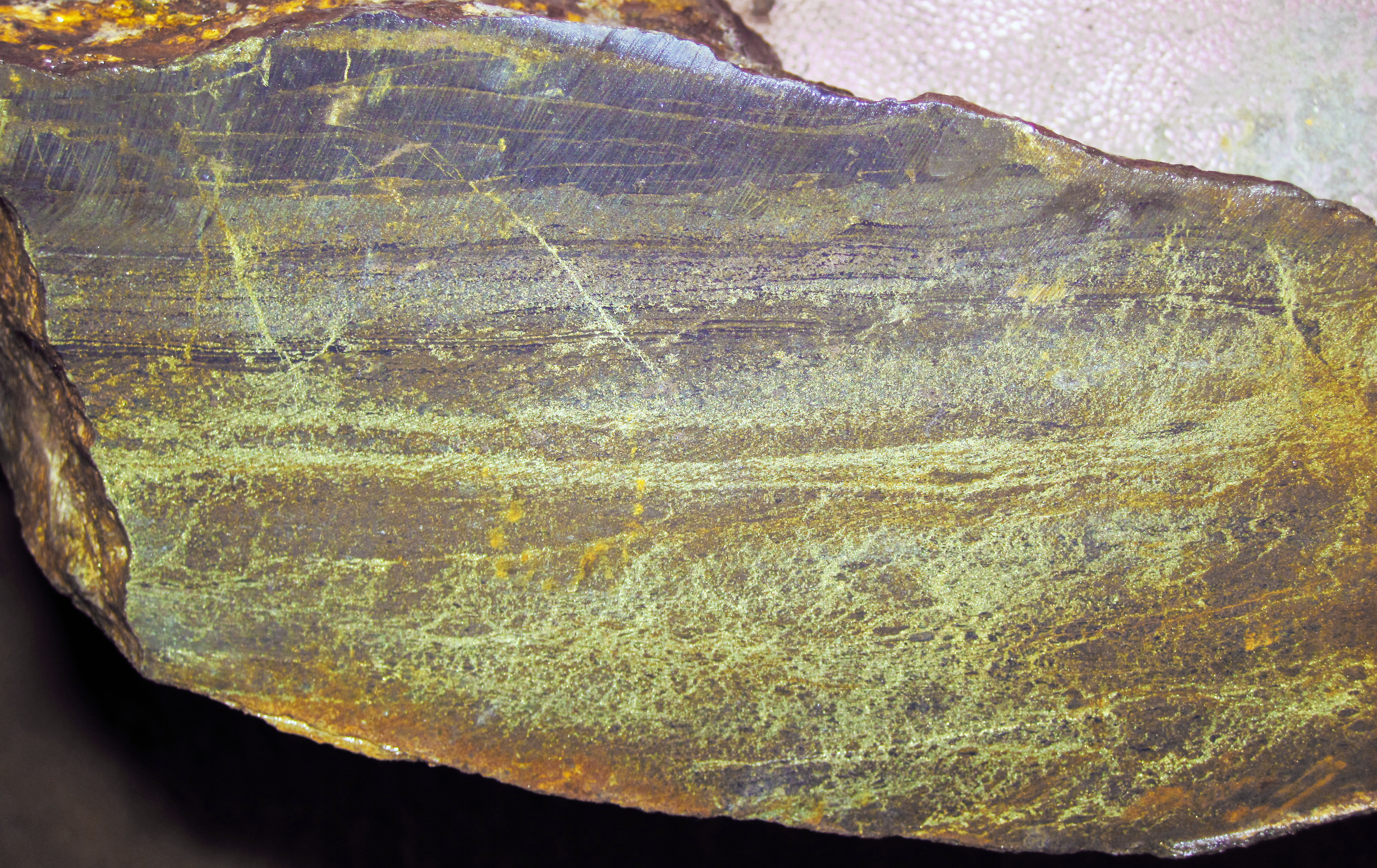
Copper-zinc ore sample from a VMS deposit at Potter Mine in Timmins, Ontario, Canada. The brassy-yellow mineral is chalcopyrite- the primary ore mineral at this mine.

Although Chalcopyrite does not contain the most copper in its structure relative to other minerals, it is the most important copper ore since it can be found in many localities. Chalcopyrite ore occurs in a variety of ore types, from huge masses as at Timmins, Ontario, to irregular veins and disseminations associated with granitic to dioritic intrusives as in the porphyry copper deposits of Broken Hill, the American Cordillera and the Andes. The largest deposit of nearly pure chalcopyrite ever discovered in Canada was at the southern end of the Temagami Greenstone Belt where Copperfields Mine extracted the high-grade copper.

Chalcopyrite is present in the supergiant Olympic Dam Cu-Au-U deposit in South Australia.

Chalcopyrite may also be found in coal seams associated with pyrite nodules, and as disseminations in carbonate sedimentary rocks.

== Extraction of copper ==
Copper flash smelting process, a pyrometallurgical method of copper extraction from chalcopyrite

Copper metal is predominantly extracted from chalcopyrite ore using two methods: pyrometallurgy and hydrometallurgy. The most common and commercially viable method, pyrometallurgy, involves "crushing, grinding, flotation, smelting, refining, and electro-refining" techniques. Crushing, leaching, solvent extraction, and electrowinning are techniques used in hydrometallurgy. Specifically in the case of chalcopyrite, pressure oxidation leaching is practiced.

=== Pyrometallurgical processes ===
The most important method for copper extraction from chalcopyrite is pyrometallurgy. Pyrometallurgy is commonly used for large scale, copper rich operations with high-grade ores. This is because Cu-Fe-S ores, such as chalcopyrite, are difficult to dissolve in aqueous solutions. The extraction process using this method undergoes four stages:

1. Isolating desired elements from ore using froth flotation to create a concentration
2. Creating a high-Cu sulfide matte by smelting the concentration
3. Oxidizing/converting the sulfide matte, resulting in an impure molten copper
4. Refining by fire and electrowinning techniques to increase purity of resultant copper

Chalcopyrite ore is not directly smelted. This is because the ore is primarily composed of non-economically valuable material, or waste rock, with low concentrations of copper. The abundance of waste material results in a lot of hydrocarbon fuel being required to heat and melt the ore. Alternatively, copper is isolated from the ore first using a technique called froth flotation. Essentially, reagents are used to make the copper water-repellent, thus the Cu is able to concentrate in a flotation cell by floating on air bubbles. In contrast to the 0.5–2% copper in chalcopyrite ore, froth flotation results in a concentrate containing about 30% copper.

The concentrate then undergoes a process called matte smelting. Matte smelting oxidizes the sulfur and iron by melting the flotation concentrate in a 1250 °C furnace to create a new concentrate (matte) with about 45–75% copper. This process is typically done in flash furnaces. To reduce the amount of copper in the slag material, the slag is kept molten with an addition of SiO_{2} flux to promote immiscibility between concentration and slag. In terms of byproducts, matte smelting copper can produce SO_{2} gas which is harmful to the environment, thus it is captured in the form of sulfuric acid. Example reactions are as follows:

1. 2 CuFeS_{2} (s) + 3.25 O_{2} (g) → Cu_{2}S-_{0.5}FeS (l) + 1.5 FeO (s) + 2.5 SO_{2} (g)
2. 2 FeO (s) + SiO_{2} (s) → Fe_{2}SiO_{4} (l)

Converting involves oxidizing the matte once more to further remove sulfur and iron; however, the product is 99% molten copper. Converting occurs in two stages: the slag forming stage and the copper forming stage. In the slag forming stage, iron and sulfur are reduced to concentrations of less than 1% and 0.02%, respectively. The concentrate from matte smelting is poured into a converter that is then rotated, supplying the slag with oxygen through tuyeres. The reaction is as follows:

2 FeS (l) + 3 O_{2} (g) + SiO_{2} (s) → Fe_{2}SiO_{4} (l) + 2 SO_{2} (g) + heat

In the copper forming stage, the matte produced from the slag stage undergoes charging (inputting the matte in the converter), blowing (blasting more oxygen), and skimming (retrieving impure molten copper known as blister copper). The reaction is as follows:

Cu_{2}S (l) + O_{2} (g) → 2 Cu (l) + SO_{2} (g) + heat

Finally, the blister copper undergoes refinement through fire, electrorefining or both. In this stage, copper is refined to a high-purity cathode.

=== Hydrometallurgical processes ===
Chalcopyrite is an exception to most copper bearing minerals. In contrast to the majority of copper minerals which can be leached at atmospheric conditions, such as through heap leaching, chalcopyrite is a refractory mineral that requires elevated temperatures as well as oxidizing conditions to release its copper into solution. This is because of the extracting challenges which arise from the 1:1 presence of iron to copper, resulting in slow leaching kinetics. Elevated temperatures and pressures create an abundance of oxygen in solution, which facilitates faster reaction speeds in terms of breaking down chalcopyrite's crystal lattice. A hydrometallurgical process which elevates temperature with oxidizing conditions required for chalcopyrite is known as pressure oxidation leaching. A typical reaction series of chalcopyrite under oxidizing, high temperature conditions is as follows:

- 2 CuFeS_{2} + 4 Fe_{2}(SO_{4})_{3} → 2 Cu^{2+} + 2 SO^{2−}_{4} + 10 FeSO_{4} + 4 S
- 4 FeSO_{4} + O_{2} + 2 H_{2}SO_{4} → 2 Fe_{2}(SO_{4})_{3} + 2 H_{2}O
- 2 S + 3 O_{2} + 2 H_{2}O → 2 H_{2}SO_{4}
- (Overall reaction) 4 CuFeS_{2} + 17 O_{2} + 4 H_{2}O → 4 Cu^{2+} + 2 Fe_{2}O_{3} + 4 H_{2}SO_{4}

Pressure oxidation leaching is particularly useful for low grade chalcopyrite. This is because it can "process concentrate product from flotation" rather than having to process whole ore. Additionally, it can be used as an alternative method to pyrometallurgy for variable ore. Other advantages hydrometallurgical processes have in regards to copper extraction over pyrometallurgical processes (smelting) include:

- The highly variable cost of smelting
- Depending on the location, the amount of smelting availability is limited
- High cost of installing smelting infrastructure
- Ability to treat high-impurity concentrates
- Increase of recovery due to ability of treating lower-grade deposits on site
- Lower transport costs (shipping concentrate not necessary)
- Overall lower cost of copper production

Although hydrometallurgy has its advantages, it continues to face challenges in the commercial setting. In turn, smelting continues to remain the most commercially viable method of copper extraction.

== See also ==
- Classification of minerals
- List of minerals
- Kesterite
