= Bornite =

Sulfide mineral

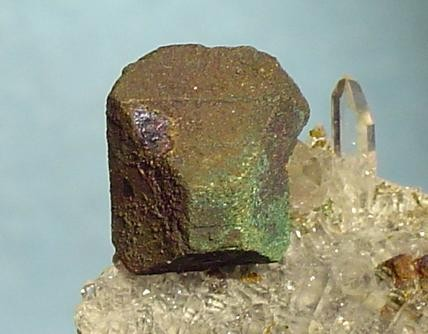
- Lightly iridescent bornite crystal on quartz needles, from Kazakhstan; Specimen size: 3.6 cm × 2.2 cm × 1.2 cm (1.42 in × 0.87 in × 0.47 in)

General
- Category: Sulfide mineral
- Formula: Cu_{5}FeS_{4}
- IMA symbol: Bn
- Strunz classification: 2.BA.10
- Crystal system: Orthorhombic
- Crystal class: Dipyramidal (mmm); H-M symbol: (2/m 2/m 2/m)
- Space group: Pbca
- Unit cell: a = 10.95 Å, b = 21.862 Å, c = 10.95 Å; Z = 16

Identification
- Formula mass: 501.88 g/mol
- Color: Copper red, bronze brown, purple
- Crystal habit: Granular, massive, disseminated – Crystals pseudocubic, dodecahedral, octahedral
- Twinning: Penetration twins on [111]
- Cleavage: Poor on [111]
- Fracture: Uneven to subconchoidal
- Tenacity: Brittle
- Mohs scale hardness: 3–3.25
- Luster: Metallic if fresh, iridescent tarnish
- Streak: Grayish black
- Diaphaneity: Opaque
- Specific gravity: 5.06–5.08
- Refractive index: Opaque
- Pleochroism: Weak but noticeable
- Other characteristics: Magnetic after heating, iridescent

Bornite, also known as peacock ore, is a sulfide mineral with chemical composition Cu_{5}FeS_{4} that crystallizes in the orthorhombic system (pseudo-cubic). It is an important copper ore.

== Appearance ==
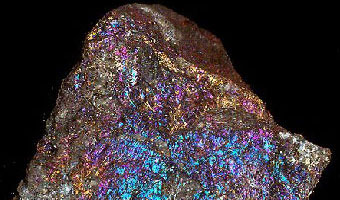
Tarnish of bornite

Bornite has a brown to copper-red color on fresh surfaces that tarnishes to various iridescent shades of blue to purple in places. Its striking iridescence gives it the nickname peacock copper or peacock ore.

== Mineralogy ==
Bornite is an important copper ore mineral and occurs widely in porphyry copper deposits along with the more common chalcopyrite. Chalcopyrite and bornite are both typically replaced by chalcocite and covellite in the supergene enrichment zone of copper deposits. Bornite is also found as disseminations in mafic igneous rocks, in contact metamorphic skarn deposits, in pegmatites and in sedimentary cupriferous shales. It is important as an ore for its copper content of about 63 percent by mass.

=== Structure ===
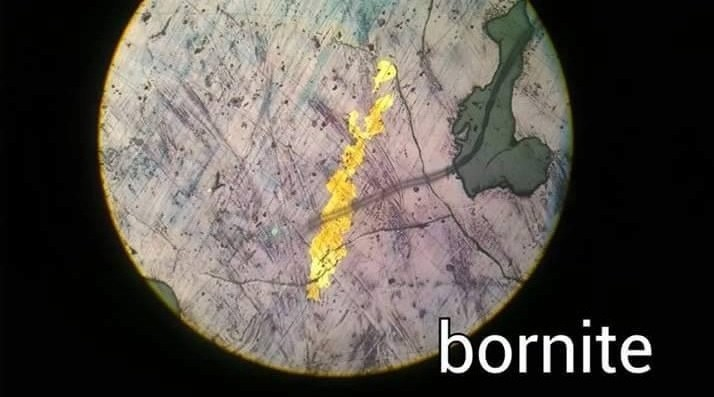
Microscopic picture of Bornite

At temperatures above 228 °C (442 °F), the structure is isometric with a unit cell that is about 5.50 Å on an edge. This structure is based on cubic close-packed sulfur atoms, with copper and iron atoms randomly distributed into six of the eight tetrahedral sites located in the octants of the cube. With cooling, the Fe and Cu become ordered, so that 5.5 Å subcells in which all eight tetrahedral sites are filled alternate with subcells in which only four of the tetrahedral sites are filled; symmetry is reduced to orthorhombic.

=== Composition ===
Substantial variation in the relative amounts of copper and iron is possible and solid solution extends towards chalcopyrite (CuFeS_{2}) and digenite (Cu_{9}S_{5}). Exsolution of blebs and lamellae of chalcopyrite, digenite, and chalcocite is common.

=== Form and twinning ===
Rare crystals are approximately cubic, dodecahedral, or octahedral. Usually massive. Penetration twinning on the crystallographic direction, {111}.

== Occurrence ==
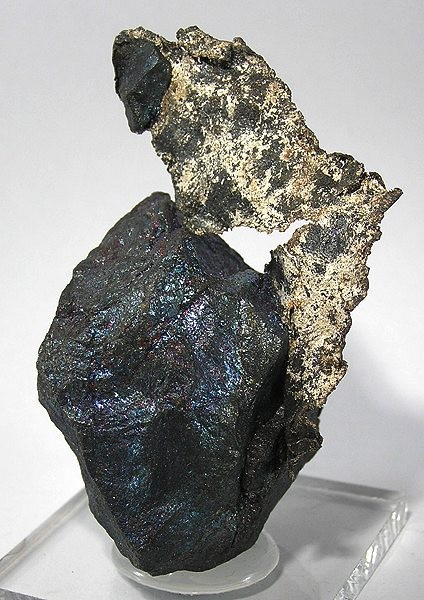
Bornite with silver from Zacatecas, Mexico (size: 7.5 × 4.3 × 3.4 cm)

It occurs globally in copper ores with notable crystal localities in Butte, Montana and at Bristol, Connecticut in the U.S. It is also collected from the Carn Brea mine, Illogan, and elsewhere in Cornwall, England. Large crystals are found from the Frossnitz Alps, eastern Tirol, Austria; the Mangula mine, Lomagundi district, Zimbabwe; from the N'ouva mine, Talate, Morocco, the West Coast of Tasmania and in Dzhezkazgan, Kazakhstan. There are also traces of it found amongst the hematite in the Pilbara region of Western Australia. Bornite has also been found on historical copper and bronze artifacts which have been submitted to a hot mineral spring environment, although a patina of this sort is considered rare.

== History and etymology ==
It was first described in 1725 for an occurrence in the Ore Mountains, Bohemia, in what is now the Karlovy Vary Region of the Czech Republic. It was named in 1845 for Austrian mineralogist Ignaz von Born. Bornite has been recognized as a copper-bearing mineral since antiquity, although it was often confused with other copper sulfides because of their similar appearance and association in ore deposits. Early civilizations mined bornite-bearing ores as a source of copper for the production of tools, weapons, ornaments, coins, and other everyday objects, helping to support the development of the Bronze Age and later metalworking cultures. As mining techniques and mineralogical science advanced during the 18th and 19th centuries, bornite was identified as a distinct mineral and became an increasingly important copper ore. Throughout the Industrial Revolution, large hydrothermal copper deposits containing bornite were extensively mined to meet the growing demand for copper used in electrical wiring, steam engines, machinery, construction, and transportation. During the 20th century, improvements in geological exploration, ore processing, and metallurgical extraction made it possible to recover copper from lower-grade bornite-bearing deposits more efficiently, further increasing the mineral's economic importance. Because of its high copper content and frequent association with other valuable sulfide minerals, bornite has remained one of the world's most significant secondary copper ores and has played an important role in the history of copper mining and metallurgy.

== See also ==
- Cuprite
- Tennantite
- Tetrahedrite
- List of minerals named after people

== Bibliography ==
- Palache, C., H. Berman, and C. Frondel (1944) Dana’s system of mineralogy, (7th edition), v. I, 195–197.
- Manning, P.G. (1966) A study of the bonding Properties of Sulphur in Bornite, The Canadian Mineralogist, 9, 85-94
