= Copper carbonate =

Copper carbonate may refer to:

Copper (II) compounds and minerals

- Copper(II) carbonate proper, CuCO_{3} (neutral copper carbonate): a rarely seen moisture-sensitive compound.
- Basic copper carbonate (the "copper carbonate" of commerce), actually a copper carbonate hydroxide; which may be either
  - Cu_{2}CO_{3}(OH)_{2}: the green mineral malachite, verdigris, the pigment "green verditer" or "mountain green"
  - Cu_{3}(CO_{3})_{2}(OH)_{2}: the blue mineral azurite, and the pigment "blue verditer" or "mountain blue"
  - Lapis armenus, a precious stone, a basic copper carbonate from Armenia
- Marklite, a hydrated copper carbonate mineral

Copper (I) compounds

- Copper(I) carbonate, Cu_{2}CO_{3}
