= Copper(II) hydroxide =

Hydroxide of copper

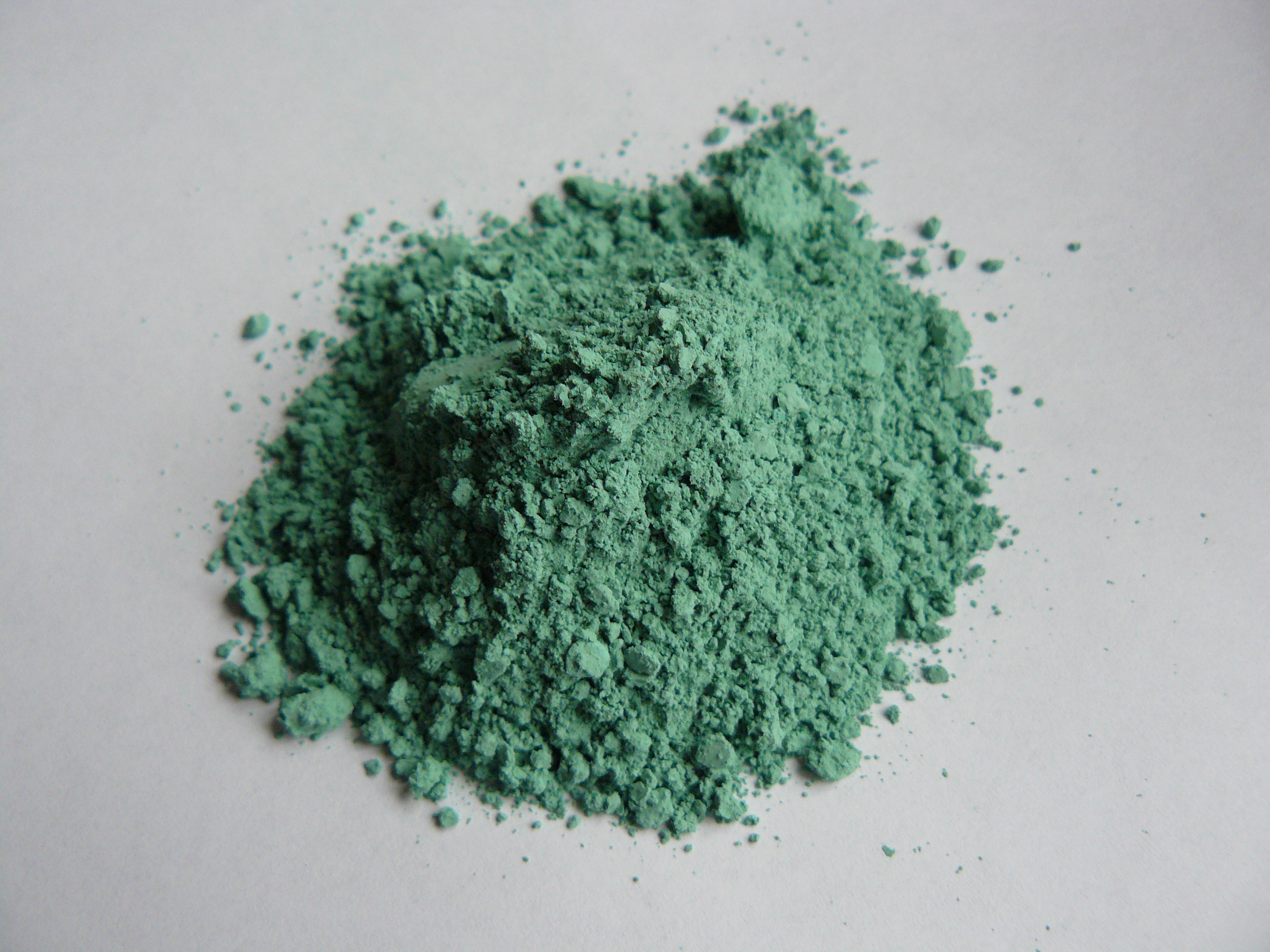
- Copper(II) hydroxide

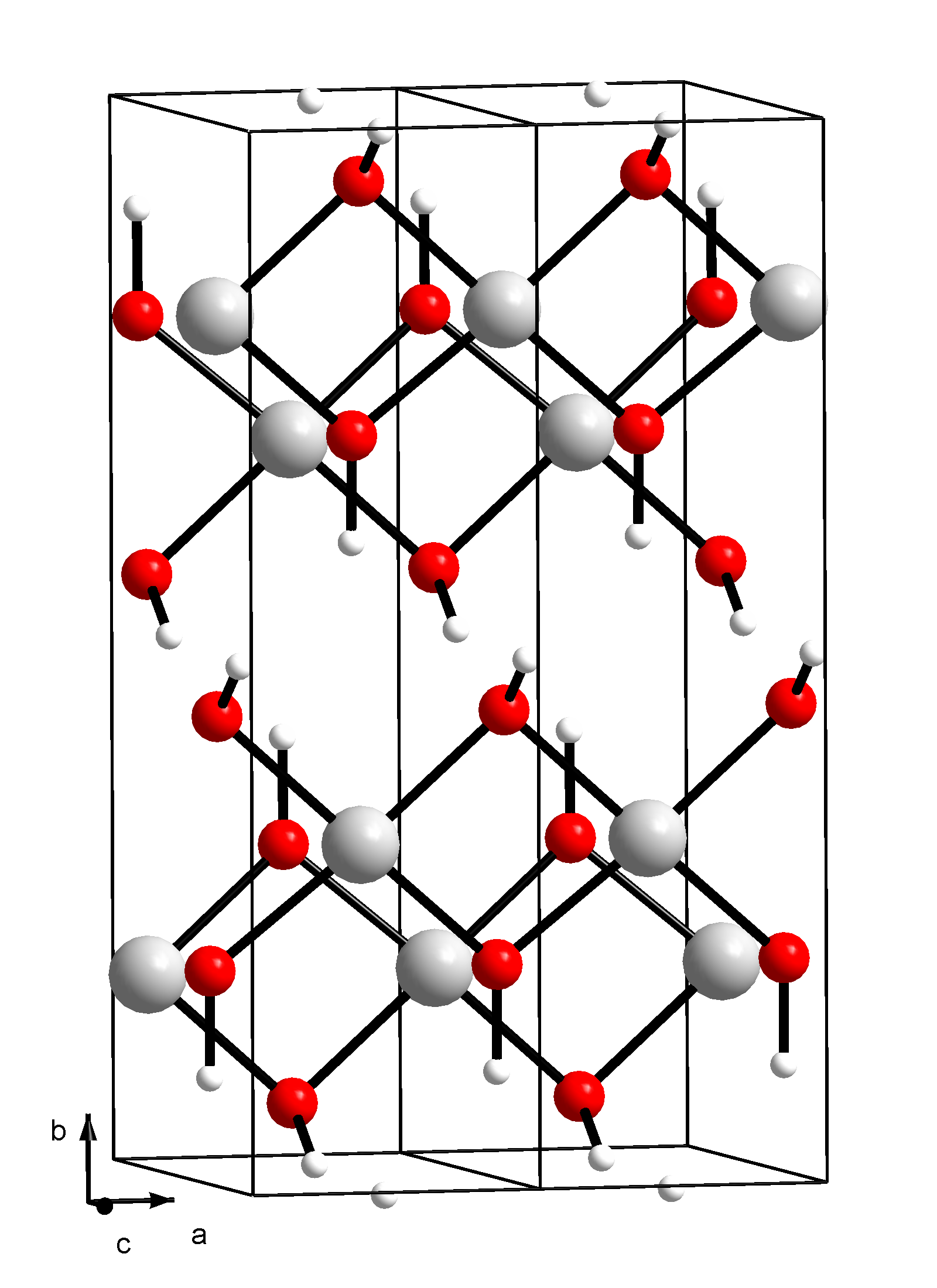

Names
- IUPAC name Copper(II) hydroxide
- Other names Cupric hydroxide

Identifiers
CAS Number	20427-59-2
3D model (JSmol)	Interactive image
ChemSpider	144498
ECHA InfoCard	100.039.817
KEGG	C18712
PubChem CID	164826
UNII	3314XO9W9A
CompTox Dashboard (EPA)	DTXSID6034473
- InChI: InChI=1S/Cu.2H2O/h;2*1H2/q+2;;/p-2 Key: JJLJMEJHUUYSSY-UHFFFAOYSA-L; InChI=1/Cu.2H2O/h;2*1H2/q+2;;/p-2 Key: JJLJMEJHUUYSSY-NUQVWONBAH
- SMILES: [Cu+2].[OH-].[OH-]

Properties
Chemical formula	Cu(OH)_{2}
Molar mass	97.561 g/mol
Appearance	Blue solid
Density	3.368 g/cm^{3}, solid
Melting point	80 °C (176 °F; 353 K) approximate, decomposes into CuO
Solubility in water	negligible
Solubility product (K_{sp})	2.20 × 10^{−20}
Solubility	insoluble in ethanol; soluble in NH_{4}OH
Magnetic susceptibility (χ)	+1170.0·10^{−6} cm^{3}/mol

Thermochemistry
Std molar entropy (S^{⦵}_{298})	108 J·mol^{−1}·K^{−1}
Std enthalpy of formation (Δ_{f}H^{⦵}_{298})	−450 kJ·mol^{−1}

Hazards
- Occupational safety and health (OHS/OSH)
Main hazards	Skin, Eye, & Respiratory Irritant
- GHS labelling
Pictograms	(GHS05: Corrosive) (GHS06: Toxic) (GHS09: Environmental hazard)
Signal word	Danger
Hazard statements	H302, H318, H330, H410
Precautionary statements	P260, P264, P264+P265, P270, P271, P273, P280, P284, P301+P317, P304+P340, P305+P354+P338, P316, P317, P320, P330, P391, P403+P233, P405, P501
NFPA 704 (fire diamond)	2 0 0
Flash point	Non-flammable
- Lethal dose or concentration (LD, LC)
LD_{50} (median dose)	1000 mg/kg (oral, rat)
- NIOSH (US health exposure limits)
PEL (Permissible)	TWA 1 mg/m^{3} (as Cu)
REL (Recommended)	TWA 1 mg/m^{3} (as Cu)
IDLH (Immediate danger)	TWA 100 mg/m^{3} (as Cu)
Safety data sheet (SDS)	SDS

Related compounds
Other anions	Copper(II) oxide Copper(II) carbonate Copper(II) sulfate Copper(II) chloride
Other cations	Nickel(II) hydroxide Zinc hydroxide Iron(II) hydroxide Cobalt hydroxide
Related compounds	Copper(I) oxide Copper(I) chloride
- Except where otherwise noted, data are given for materials in their standard state (at 25 °C [77 °F], 100 kPa). verify (what is ?) Infobox references

Copper(II) hydroxide is the hydroxide of copper with the chemical formula of Cu(OH)_{2}. It is a pale blue solid. Some forms of copper(II) hydroxide are sold as "stabilized" copper(II) hydroxide (pale greenish blue or bluish green), although they likely consist of a mixture of copper(II) carbonate and hydroxide. Cupric hydroxide is a strong base, although its low solubility in water makes this hard to observe directly.

== Occurrence ==
The mineral of the formula Cu(OH)_{2}, which is called spertiniite is rare. It absorbs carbon dioxide from the atmosphere to form a basic copper(II) carbonate:

2 Cu(OH)_{2} + CO_{2} → Cu_{2}CO_{3}(OH)_{2} + H_{2}O

The green material can be described as a 1:1 mixture of Cu(OH)_{2} and CuCO_{3}. This patina forms on bronze and other copper alloys statues such as the Statue of Liberty.

Copper(II) hydroxide pigments were used in ceramics and painting.

== Structure ==
The structure of Cu(OH)_{2} has been determined by X-ray crystallography. The copper center is square pyramidal. Four Cu-O distances in the plane range are 1.96 Å, and the axial Cu-O distance is 2.36 Å. The hydroxide ligands in the plane are either doubly bridging or triply bridging.

== Production ==
Copper(II) hydroxide can be produced by adding sodium hydroxide to various copper(II) sources. The nature of the resulting copper(II) hydroxide however is sensitive to detailed conditions. Some methods produce granular, robust copper(II) hydroxide while other methods produce a thermally sensitive colloid-like product.

Traditionally a solution of a soluble copper(II) salt, such as copper(II) sulfate (CuSO_{4}·5H_{2}O) is treated with base:

2 NaOH + CuSO_{4}·5H_{2}O → Cu(OH)_{2} + 5 H_{2}O + Na_{2}SO_{4}

This form of copper hydroxide tends to convert to black copper(II) oxide:

Cu(OH)_{2} → CuO + H_{2}O

A purer product can be attained if ammonium chloride is added to the solution beforehand to generate ammonia in situ. Alternatively it can be produced in a two-step procedure from copper(II) sulfate via "basic copper sulfate:"

4 CuSO_{4} + 6 NH_{3} + 6H_{2}O → Cu_{4}SO_{4}(OH)_{6} + 3 (NH_{4})_{2}SO_{4}
Cu_{4}SO_{4}(OH)_{6} + 2 NaOH → 4 Cu(OH)_{2} + Na_{2}SO_{4}

Alternatively, copper hydroxide is readily made by electrolysis of water (containing a little electrolyte such as sodium sulfate or magnesium sulfate) with a copper anode:

Cu + 2OH^{−} → Cu(OH)_{2} + 2e^{−}

== Uses ==
Copper(II) hydroxide in ammonia solution, known as Schweizer's reagent, dissolves cellulose. This property led to it being used in the production of rayon, a cellulose fiber.

It is also used in the aquarium industry for its ability to destroy external parasites in fish, including flukes, marine ich, Brooklynellosis, and marine velvet, without killing the fish. Although other water-soluble copper compounds can be effective in this role, they generally result in high fish mortality.

Copper(II) hydroxide has been used as an alternative to the Bordeaux mixture, a fungicide and nematicide. Such products include Kocide 3000, produced by Kocide L.L.C. Copper(II) hydroxide is also occasionally used as ceramic colorant.

Copper(II) hydroxide has been combined with latex paint, making a product designed to control root growth in potted plants. Secondary and lateral roots thrive and expand, resulting in a dense and healthy root system. It was sold under the name Spin Out, which was first introduced by Griffin L.L.C. The rights are now owned by SePRO Corp. It is now sold as Microkote either in a solution applied by the end user, or as treated pots.

== Reactions ==
It is stable to about 100 °C. Above this temperature, it will decompose into copper(II) oxide.

Copper(II) hydroxide reacts with a solution of ammonia to form a deep blue solution of tetramminecopper [Cu(NH_{3})_{4}]^{2+} complex ion.

Copper(II) hydroxide oxidizes of ammonia in presence of oxygen, giving rise to copper ammine nitrites, such as Cu(NO_{2})_{2}(NH_{3})_{n}.

Copper(II) hydroxide is mildly amphoteric. It dissolves slightly in concentrated alkali, forming [Cu(OH)_{4}]^{2−}.

=== Reagent for organic chemistry ===
Copper(II) hydroxide has a specialized role in organic synthesis. Often, when it is utilized for this purpose, it is prepared in situ by mixing a soluble copper(II) salt and potassium hydroxide. It is sometimes used in the synthesis of aryl amines. For example, copper(II) hydroxide catalyzes the reaction of ethylenediamine with 1-bromoanthraquinone or 1-amino-4-bromoanthraquinone to form 1-((2-aminoethyl)amino)anthraquinone or 1-amino-4-((2-aminoethyl)amino)anthraquinone, respectively:

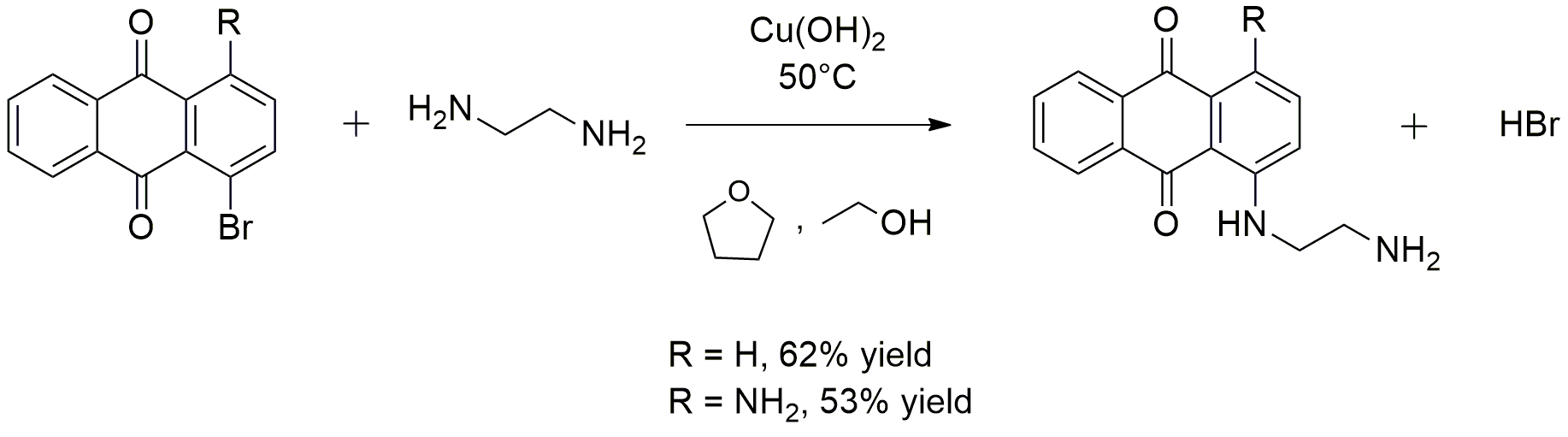

Copper(II) hydroxide also converts acid hydrazides to carboxylic acids at room temperature. This conversion can be used in the synthesis of carboxylic acids in the presence of other fragile functional groups. The yields are generally excellent as is the case with the production of benzoic acid and octanoic acid:

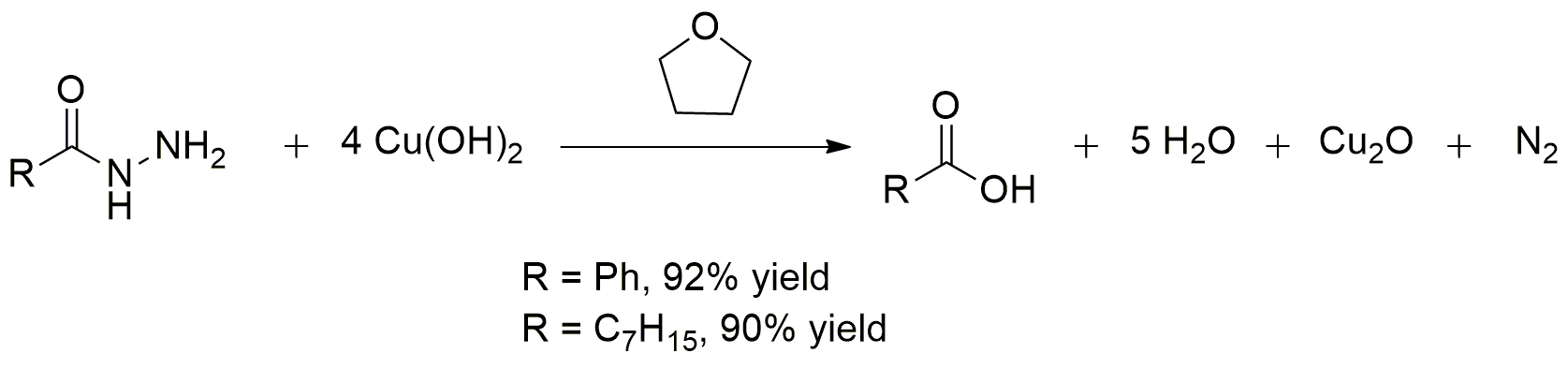

== Other copper(II) hydroxides ==
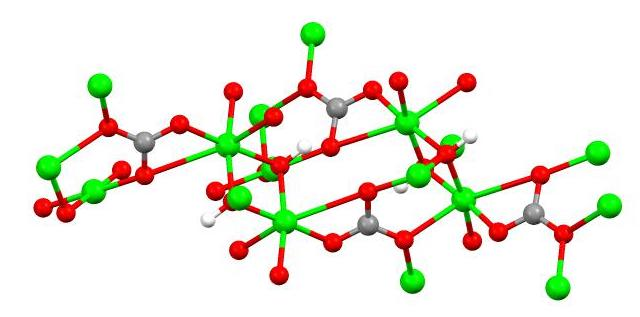
Chemical structure of azurite, one of many copper(II) hydroxides (color code: red = O, green = Cu, gray = C, white = H).

Together with other components, copper(II) hydroxides are numerous. Several copper(II)-containing minerals contain hydroxide. Notable examples include azurite, malachite, antlerite, and brochantite. Azurite (2CuCO_{3}·Cu(OH)_{2}) and malachite (CuCO_{3}·Cu(OH)_{2}) are hydroxy-carbonates, whereas antlerite (CuSO_{4}·2Cu(OH)_{2}) and brochantite (CuSO_{4}·3Cu(OH)_{2}) are hydroxy-sulfates.

Many synthetic copper(II) hydroxide derivatives have been investigated.
