= Lapis armenus =

Precious stone resembling lapis lazuli

Lapis armenus, also known as Armenian stone or lapis stellatus, in natural history, is a variety of precious stone, resembling lapis lazuli, except that it is softer, and instead of veins of pyrite, is intermixed with green. "The Armenian stone" is so similar to lapis lazuli that it has often not been distinguished from it; Webster's Revised Unabridged Dictionary for instance treats the two terms as synonyms. The Dictionary of Traded Goods and Commodities 1550-1820 defines lapis armenus as

Armenian stone, or azurite, a naturally occurring basic copper carbonate, originally from Armenia, but later from Germany, from which blue bice was prepared. It was often found in association with another copper carbonate, malachite from which green bice was prepared... Probably because they were both blue, blue bice was sometimes misinterpreted to mean lapis lazuli.

Chemically however lapis lazuli is not at all similar.

The Dutch chemist Herman Boerhaave believed it rather to rank among semi-metals, and supposed it was composed of both metal and earth. He added that it only differs from lazuli in degree of maturity, and that both of them seem to contain arsenic.

It has been found in Tirol, Hungary, and Transylvania, and used both in mosaic work, to make the blue color azure, and as a treatment of melancholia.

The Encyclopedia Perthensis of 1816 notes that Armenian stone "was anciently brought of Armenia, but now found in Germany, and Tyrol".
