= Azurite (pigment) =

Blue pigment commonly used in the Middle Ages and Renaissance

Azurite is an inorganic pigment derived from the mineral of the same name. It was likely used by artists as early as the Fourth Dynasty in Egypt, but it was less frequently employed than synthetically produced copper pigments such as Egyptian Blue. In the Middle Ages and Renaissance, it was the most prevalent blue pigment in European paintings, appearing more commonly than the more expensive ultramarine. Azurite's derivation from copper mines tends to give it a greenish hue, in contrast with the more violet tone of ultramarine. Azurite is also less stable than ultramarine, and notable paintings such as Michelangelo's The Entombment have seen their azure blues turn to olive green in time. Azurite pigment typically includes traces of malachite and cuprite; both minerals are found alongside azurite in nature, and they may account for some of the green discoloration of the pigment. The particle size of azurite pigment has been shown to have a significant effect on its chromatic intensity, and the manner of grinding and preparing the pigment therefore has a major impact on its appearance.

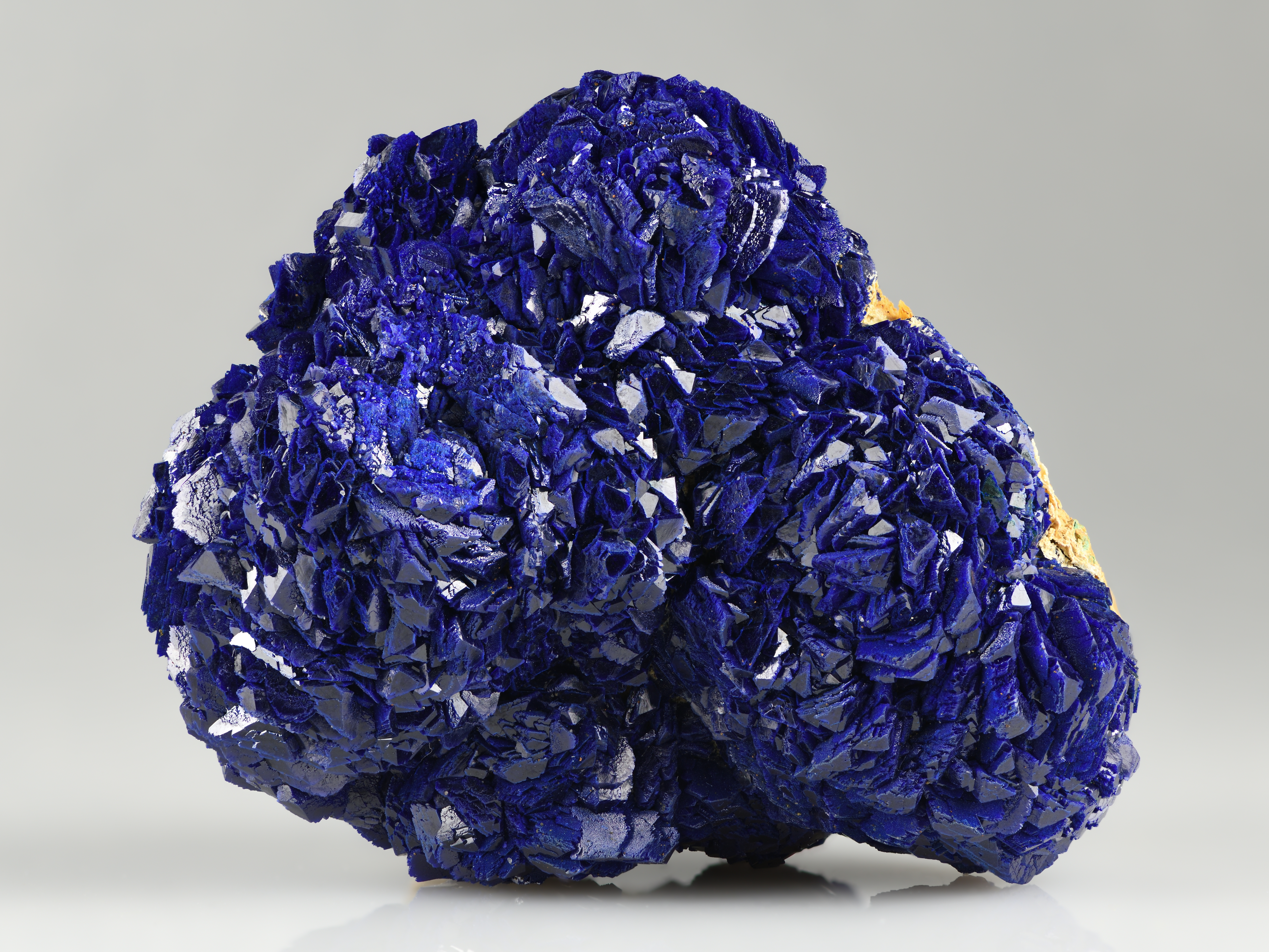
A photo of the azurite mineral, as found in nature.

== History ==
Azurite is a naturally occurring mineral found particularly in copper-mining areas of the world. It is often found with malachite, a green basic carbonate of copper. There is evidence that azurite has been used since the dawn of modern civilization, dating back to the Fourth Dynasty in Egypt. For much of its history, azurite was used more frequently than ultramarine, despite ultramarine being held in higher esteem. During the Middle Ages and Renaissance, the two were closely related as azurite would often be used as an under-paint for ultramarine, possibly to lower costs as ultramarine was the more expensive pigment of the two.

Hungary was the main supplier of European azurite until the mid 17th century, when it was invaded by the Ottoman Empire, but now Hungary is again the most popular source of the pigment. Azurite was frequently used in East Asia, but is less commonly found in Pre-Columbian indigenous and later Spanish Mission Church paintings.

With the invention of Prussian blue in 1704, azurite was displaced as the most commonly used blue pigment in European paintings, but it remained popular, possibly because of its simple preparation. Blue verditer, which is chemically similar to azurite but synthetically produced, was commonly used to paint houses in the 17th century.

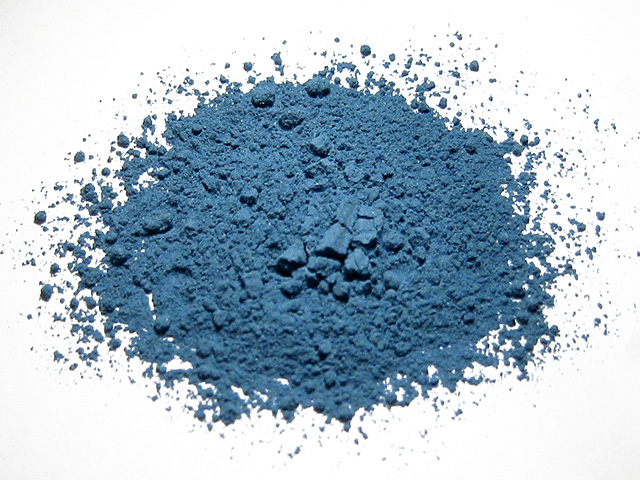
A photo of the azurite pigment after it has been ground.

== Chemical composition ==
Azurite is a basic compound that is coordinated with copper. Azurite was popular due to its stability in various light and atmospheric conditions, making it easy to store. Although azurite is permanent in oil and tempura paint, it is darkened when exposed to sulfur; this can be seen in mural paintings that use azurite. Azurite turns green as it degrades into malachite and other products.

Azurite is relatively easy to identify in conservation studies because of its characteristic ability to produce copper-coordinated compounds, ability to dissolve in acidic solution, and birefringence interactions with light. It can be identified using various spectroscopy methods such as X-ray diffraction, emission, IR spectroscopy, and Raman spectrophotometry.

== Conservation ==
Due to its association with copper and malachite, a green pigment, the hue of azurite can change to a greenish blue hue over time. Conservation studies of a 14th-15th century wall painting of San Antonio Abate in the church of San Pietro near Florence, Italy revealed that the azurite degradation product, once thought to be malachite, is actually paratacamite. Paratacamite and atacamite are two different phases of a basic copper chloride that are both formed through the degradation of azurite; they can be distinguished using FTIR techniques.

There is controversy over how to restore azurite degradation because the typical technique of applying ammonium carbonate and barium hydroxide does produce a dark blue hue, but it is not azurite. Rather, the dark blue compound is produced due to the action of barium hydroxide, and not ammonium carbonate, although both are present in the typical conservation technique used to restore azurite. Moreover, the blue color is not stable; the San Antonio Abate church wall painting changed color two years after its restoration.

== Grinding ==
A finer grind makes azurite appear paler whereas a coarser grind deepens its color. For use in early modern paintings, azurite was ground by hand. Artists employed special techniques which required training to grind the pigment in order to achieve different intensities. Azurite grinding therefore varied across workshops. Different grinding styles are characterized by both the pigment-medium ratio and the particle size distribution of the pigment. Azurite particles are irregular in size and often contains impurities such as malachite and cuprite due to its close association with these compounds. The pigment to volume concentration of azurite is difficult to study because azurite was often mixed with varying amounts of lead white, especially in early Netherlandish paintings.

== Association with ultramarine ==
Azurite was often used with ultramarine as a cost-saving measure. The two can be distinguished by contrasting the blue-green degradation of azurite with the blue-violet degradation of ultramarine. Ultramarine is often more finely ground than azurite; because azurite is a strong pigment if left coarsely ground, artists took care not to grind it too finely.

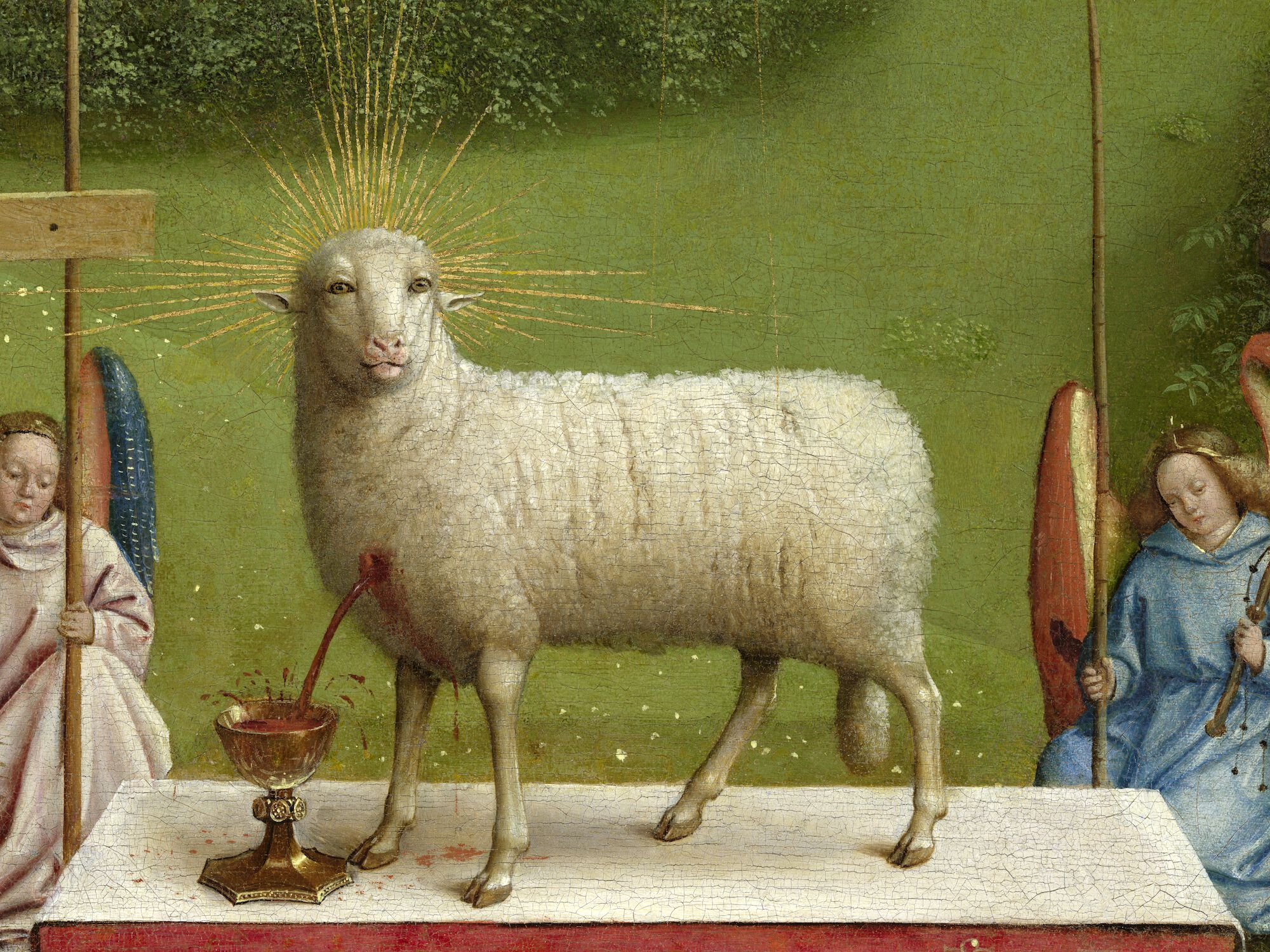
The Mystic Lamb, a painting in which azurite is used.

In the painting Mystic Lamb, ultramarine and azurite were used in nearly the same areas and in similar particle size distributions. Both pigments are finely ground. However, The Mystic Lamb alone should not be used to generalize the style of azurite in early Netherlandish paintings. In a different early Netherlandish painting from the workshop of Dieric Bouts, azurite and ultramarine are used together, but azurite is more coarsely ground.

== In paintings ==
Azurite was frequently used in European Renaissance painting. It appears, for example, in the dark blue sky of a Spanish altarpiece painting by Bartolome Bermejo. In this painting, azurite is also combined with lead white to paint the green robe of the Saint. During this time, azurite was a common pigment used to paint a blue sky.

In the 1520 painting titled Christ Taking Leave of His Mother by Albrecht Altdorfer, azurite is used in the blue garments of the figures. In addition, azurite is mixed with lead white to paint the sky.

Azurite has been used to produce greens for foliage and landscapes and mixed with red pigments to produce violet.

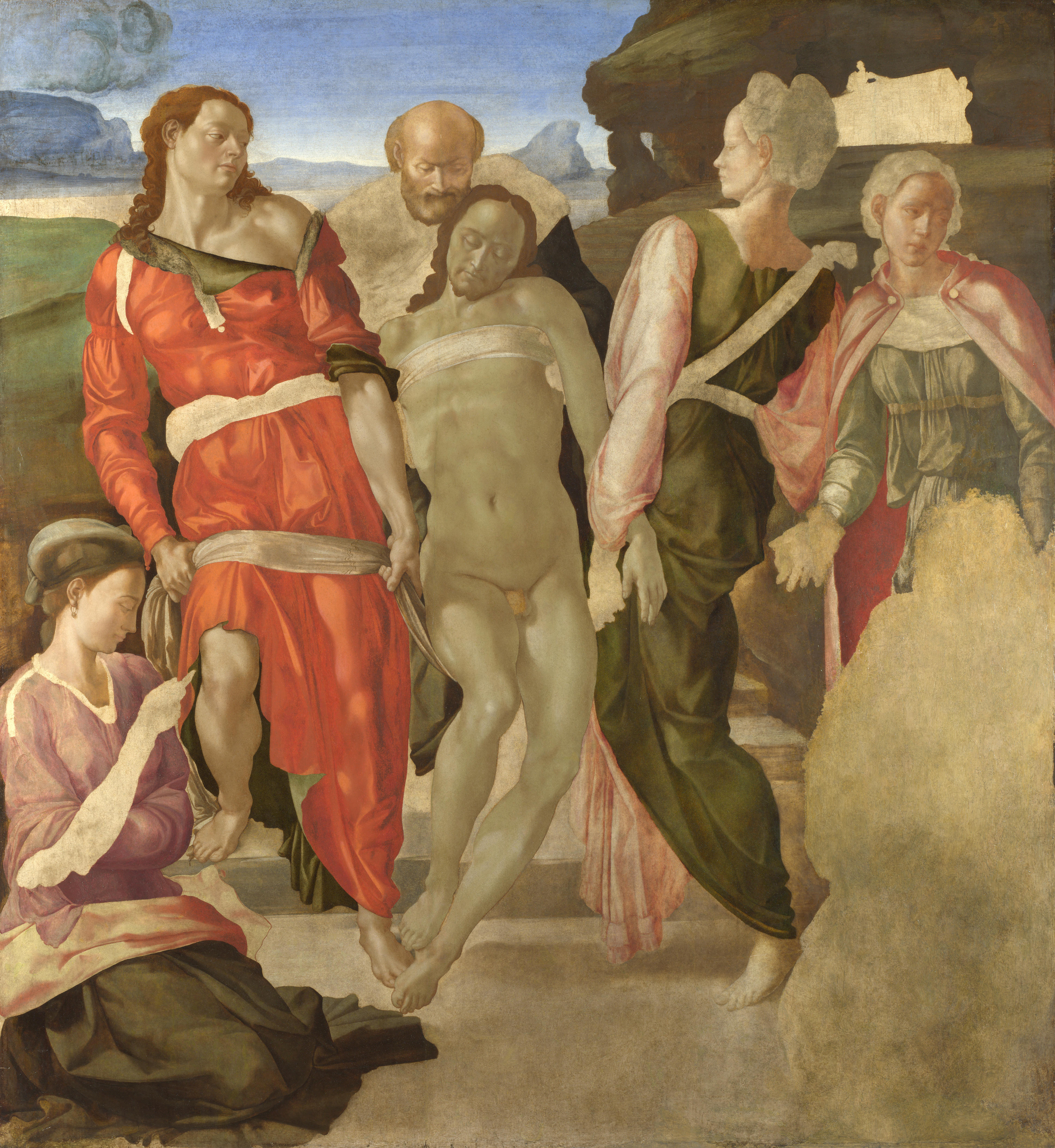
Michelangelo, The Entombment, ca. 1500–1501. The azure blue in the drapery has turned green in time.

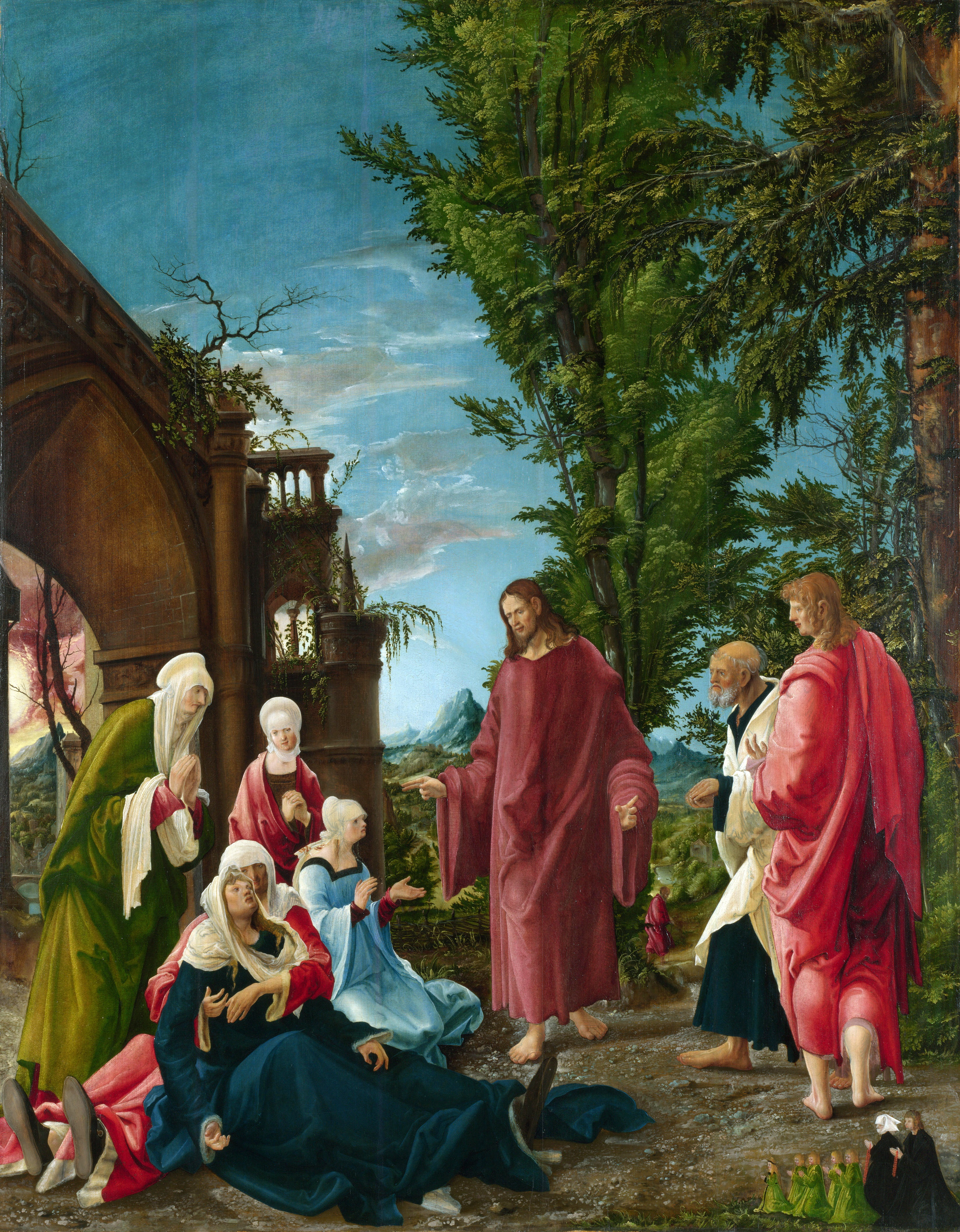
Albrecht Altdorfer, Christ Taking Leave of His Mother, ca. 1520. The blue color of the clothing and sky is derived exclusively from azurite.
