= Copper(II) lactate =

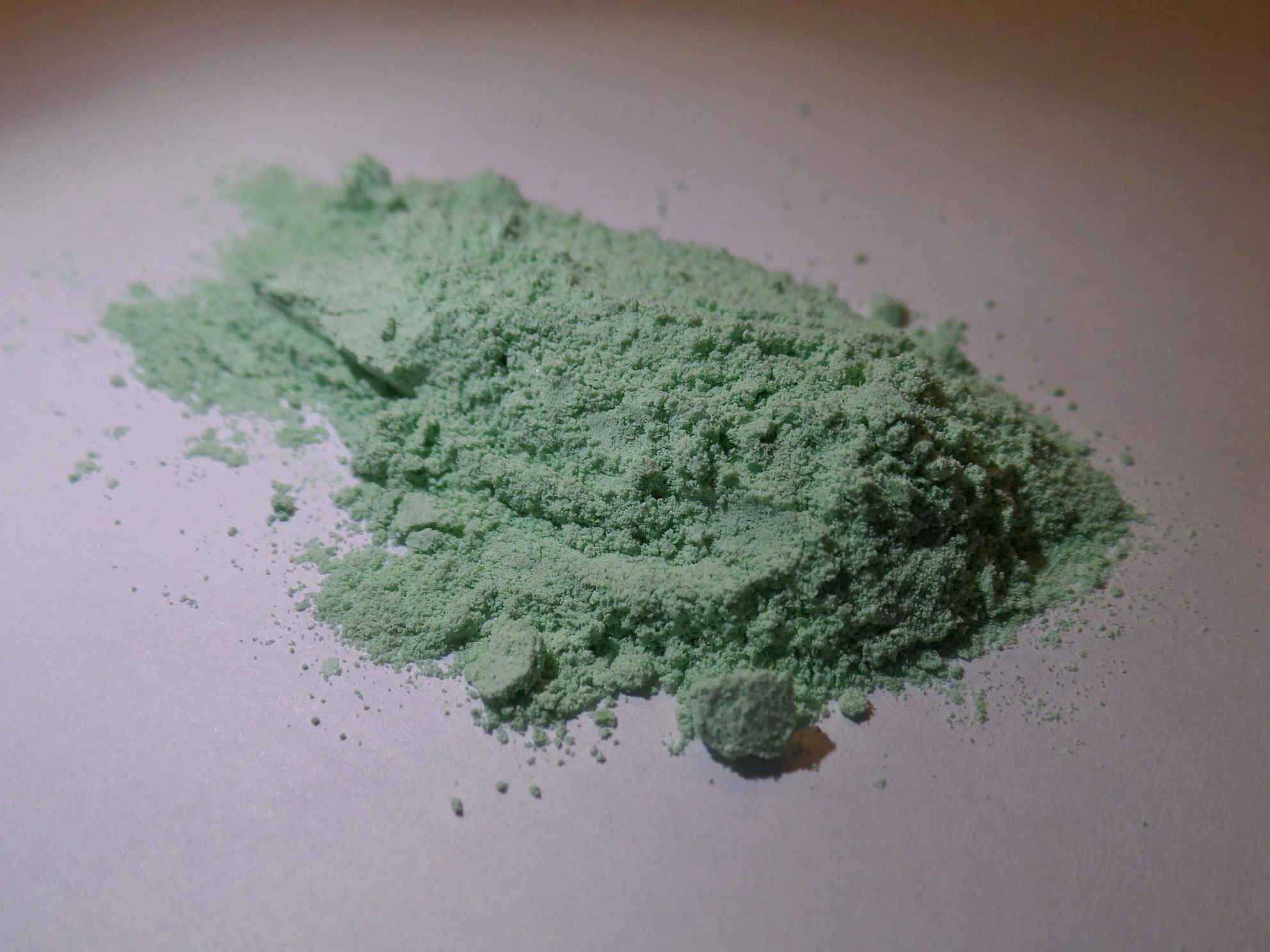

Names
- IUPAC name copper;2-hydroxypropanoate

Identifiers
CAS Number	16039-52-4
3D model (JSmol)	Interactive image
ChemSpider	12593
ECHA InfoCard	100.036.509
EC Number	240-177-3
PubChem CID	13145
UNII	4P8B1X24UA
CompTox Dashboard (EPA)	DTXSID40894965
- InChI: InChI=1S/2C3H6O3.Cu/c2*1-2(4)3(5)6;/h2*2,4H,1H3,(H,5,6);/q;;+2/p-2 Key: DYROSKSLMAPFBZ-UHFFFAOYSA-L
- SMILES: CC(C(=O)[O-])O.CC(C(=O)[O-])O.[Cu+2]

Properties
Chemical formula	Cu(C_{3}H_{5}O_{3})_{2} (anhydrous); Cu(C_{3}H_{5}O_{3})_{2}·2H_{2}O (dihydrate)
Molar mass	241.69 g/mol (anhydrous); 277.72 g/mol (dihydrate)
Appearance	green powder
Solubility in water	167 g/L (dihydrate, cold water); 450 g/L (dihydrate, hot water)
Solubility	insoluble in acetone and isopropyl alcohol

Structure
Crystal structure	monoclinic
Space group	P2_{1} (No. 4)
Lattice constant	a = 9.3583 Å, b = 9.3583 Å, c = 22.0638 Å α = 90°, β = 98.0260°, γ = 90°
Lattice volume (V)	623.34 Å^{3}
Formula units (Z)	2 units per cell

Hazards
- GHS labelling
Pictograms	(GHS07: Exclamation mark)
Signal word	Warning
Hazard statements	H302
Precautionary statements	P264, P270, P301+P312, P330, P501
- Except where otherwise noted, data are given for materials in their standard state (at 25 °C [77 °F], 100 kPa). Infobox references

Copper(II) lactate, also referred to as cupric lactate, is the chemical compound with the formula Cu(C_{3}H_{5}O_{3})_{2}. It is a green powder that readily dissolves in hot water to form a green solution, often more blue than the acetate. This complex has been used to modify the solubility of copper(II) in alkaline media, which allows controlled electrodeposition of cuprous oxide.

== Preparation ==
Copper(II) lactate can be prepared by reacting lactic acid with copper hydroxide.
