= Ceramic colorants =

Pigments used to color clay and glazes

Ceramic colorants are added to a glaze or a clay to create color. Carbonates and oxides of certain metals, characterize most colorants including the commonly used cobalt carbonate, cobalt oxide, chrome oxide, red iron oxide, and copper carbonate. These colorants can create a multitude of colors depending on other materials they interact with and to which temperature and in which atmosphere they are fired.

== Cobalt ==
Cobalt is commonly used in either its carbonate (CoCO_{3}) or its oxide (Co_{3}O_{4}) forms. In the presence of most fluxes, it yields blue colors ranging from low saturation pastels to high saturation midnight blues in both oxidation and reduction atmospheres. However, in the presence of magnesium, cobalt can become purple or pink depending on whether it was fired in oxidation (yields purple) or reduction. Cobalt is also commonly used in black glazes and in washes as decorative medium. Common saturation percentages for low saturation range from (.25 to .5%) and in high saturation from (1 to 2%).

== Chrome ==
"Chrome is a rather versatile and fickle colorant," (Chappell). Chrome oxide (Cr_{2}O_{3}) is commonly used for achieving greens. However, in the presence of zinc, chrome can produce brown. Glazes with tin oxide present will often blush to pink if fumed with chrome or if chrome is present in the glaze with the tin, often intense pinks occur. If fired above cone 6, chrome will fume and become a gas in the kiln. Common saturation percentages for chrome at low saturation range from (.25 to .5%) and at higher percentages from (1 to 2%). Chrome is a refractory.

== Red Iron ==
Iron is commonly used as a colorant in its red iron oxide form as (Fe_{2}O_{3}). Red iron oxide is commonly used to produce earthy reds and browns. It is the metal responsible for making earthenwares red. Iron is also another tricky colorant because of its ability to yield different colors under different circumstances. At low percentages (.5-1%) and in the presence of potassium, iron will become light blue or light blue-green in reduction (as is seen in traditional celadons). In the presence of barium, iron may become yellow green. When used in combination with calcium, red iron oxide can become pale yellow or amber in oxidation or green in reduction. Common percentages for red iron oxide range from (4 up to 10%).

== Copper ==
Copper's carbonate form (CuCO_{3}) is commonly used to produce greens, turquoise, and copper reds. If need be, copper oxide (CuO) can be substituted but has a larger particle size and glazes should be adjusted to generally half the amount called for. In barium based glazes greenish blues often result from copper. Alkaline feldspar glazes with copper fired in reduction atmospheres will often yield ox blood or copper red glazes discovered by the Chinese. When fired above cone 8 copper can become unstable and will often fume off of a glaze in vapor form.
