= Chessy, Rhône =

Chessy
- Commune
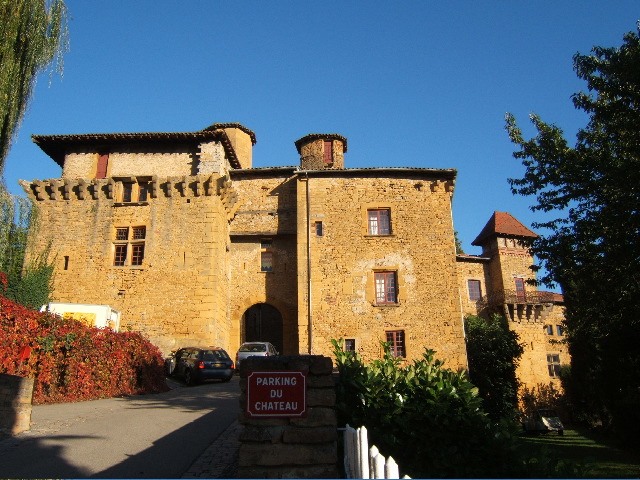
- The entrance of the château

- Coat of arms
- Location of Chessy
- Location within France Location within Auvergne-Rhône-Alpes
- Coordinates: 45°53′17″N 4°37′27″E
- Country: France
- Region: Auvergne-Rhône-Alpes
- Department: Rhône
- Arrondissement: Villefranche-sur-Saône
- Canton: Val d'Oingt
- Intercommunality: Beaujolais Pierres Dorées

Government
  - Mayor (2020–2026): Thierry Padilla-Quintana
- Area^{1}: 4.55 km^{2} (1.76 sq mi)
- Elevation: 205 m (673 ft)
- Highest elevation: 342 m (1,122 ft)
- Lowest elevation: 211 m (692 ft)
- Population (2023): 2,055
  - Density: 452/km^{2} (1,170/sq mi)
- Time zone: UTC+01:00 (CET)
  - Summer (DST): UTC+02:00 (CEST)
- INSEE/Postal code: 69056 /69380
- ^{1} French Land Register data, which excludes lakes, ponds, glaciers > 1 km^{2} (0.386 sq mi or 247 acres) and river estuaries.

Chessy (French: [ʃɛsi]), also known as Chessy-les-Mines ([ʃɛsi le min]), is a commune in the Rhône department in eastern France.

Chessy-les-Mines is the type locality of the mineral azurite, also known as "chessylite." The species was redescribed and renamed in 1824 by François-Sulpice Beudant (1787–1850), French mineralogist and geologist.

== Population ==
Historical population
Year	Pop.	±% p.a.
1968	942	—
1975	977	+0.52%
1982	1,098	+1.68%
1990	1,262	+1.76%
1999	1,313	+0.44%
2007	1,529	+1.92%
2012	1,824	+3.59%
2017	2,063	+2.49%
2023	2,055	−0.06%
Source: INSEE

== See also ==
- Communes of the Rhône department
