= Azurite =

Copper carbonate mineral

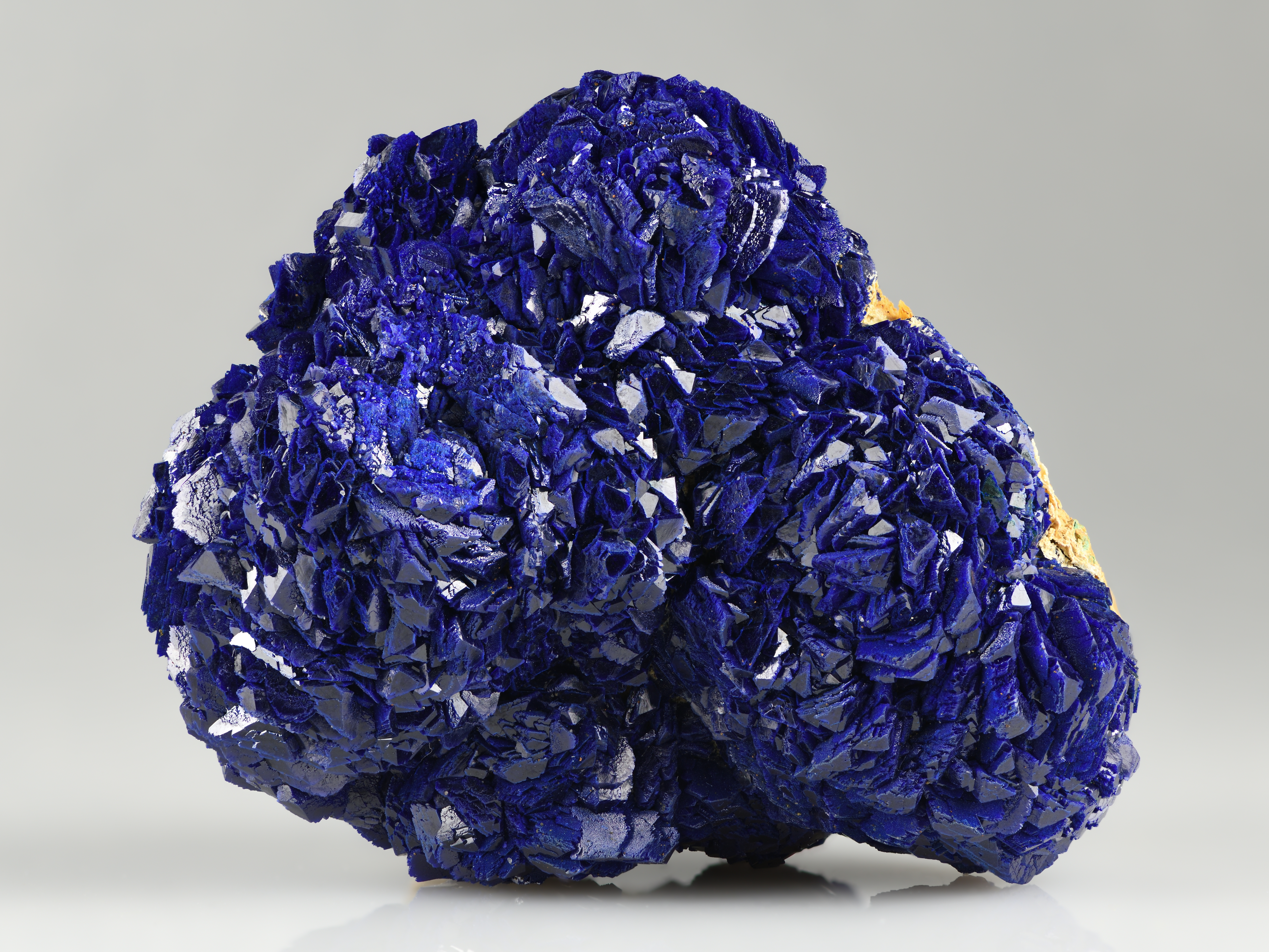
- Azurite from New Nevada lode, La Sal, Utah, United States

General
- Category: Carbonate mineral
- Formula: Cu_{3}(CO_{3})_{2}(OH)_{2}
- IMA symbol: Azu
- Strunz classification: 5.BA.05
- Crystal system: Monoclinic
- Crystal class: Prismatic (2/m) (same H-M symbol)
- Space group: P2_{1}/c
- Unit cell: a = 5.01 Å, b = 5.85 Å c = 10.35 Å; β = 92.43°; Z = 2

Identification
- Formula mass: 344.67 g/mol
- Color: Azure-blue, dark to pale blue; pale blue in transmitted light
- Crystal habit: Massive, prismatic, stalactitic, tabular
- Twinning: Rare, twin planes {1̅01}, {1̅02} or {001}
- Cleavage: Perfect on {011}, fair on {100}, poor on {110}
- Fracture: Conchoidal
- Tenacity: Brittle
- Mohs scale hardness: 3.5 to 4
- Luster: Vitreous
- Streak: Light blue
- Diaphaneity: Transparent to translucent
- Specific gravity: 3.773 (measured), 3.78 (calculated)
- Optical properties: Biaxial (+)
- Refractive index: n_{α} = 1.730 n_{β} = 1.758 n_{γ} = 1.838
- Birefringence: δ = 0.108
- Pleochroism: Visible shades of blue
- 2V angle: Measured: 68°, calculated: 64°
- Dispersion: relatively weak

Azurite or Azure spar is a soft, deep-blue copper mineral produced by weathering of copper ore deposits. During the early 19th century, it was also known as chessylite, after the type locality at Chessy near Lyon, France. The mineral, a basic carbonate with the chemical formula Cu_{3}(CO_{3})_{2}(OH)_{2}, has been known since ancient times, and was mentioned in Pliny the Elder's Natural History under the Greek name kuanos (κυανός: "deep blue," root of English cyan) and the Latin name caeruleum. Copper (Cu^{2+}) gives it its deep blue color.

== Mineralogy ==
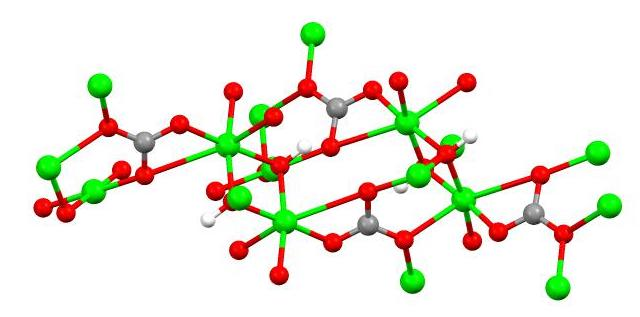
Chemical structure of azurite. Color code: red = O, green = Cu, gray = C, white = H)

Azurite has the formula Cu_{3}(CO_{3})_{2}(OH)_{2}, with the copper(II) cations linked to two different anions, carbonate and hydroxide. It is one of two relatively common basic copper(II) carbonate minerals, the other being bright green malachite. Aurichalcite is a rare basic carbonate of copper and zinc. Simple copper carbonate (CuCO_{3}) is not known to exist in nature, due to the high affinity of the Cu^{2+} ion for the hydroxide anion HO^{−}.

Azurite crystallizes in the monoclinic system. Large crystals are dark blue, often prismatic. Azurite specimens can be massive to nodular or can occur as drusy crystals lining a cavity.

Azurite has a Mohs hardness of 3.5 to 4. The specific gravity of azurite is 3.7 to 3.9. Characteristic of a carbonate, specimens effervesce upon treatment with hydrochloric acid. The combination of deep blue color and effervescence when moistened with hydrochloric acid are identifying characteristics of the mineral.

=== Color ===
The optical properties (color, intensity) of minerals such as azurite and malachite are characteristic of copper(II). Many coordination complexes of copper(II) exhibit similar colors. According to crystal field theory, the color results from low energy d-d transitions associated with the d^{9} metal center.

=== Weathering ===
Azurite is unstable in open air compared to malachite, and often is pseudomorphically replaced by malachite. This weathering process involves the replacement of some of the water (H_{2}O) units with carbon dioxide (CO_{2}), changing the carbonate:hydroxide ratio of azurite from 1:1 to the 1:2 ratio of malachite:

2 Cu_{3}(CO_{3})_{2}(OH)_{2} + H_{2}O → 3 Cu_{2}CO_{3}(OH)_{2} + CO_{2}

From the above equation, the conversion of azurite into malachite is attributable to the low partial pressure of carbon dioxide in air.

Azurite is quite stable under ordinary storage conditions, so that specimens retain their deep blue color for long periods of time.

=== Occurrences ===
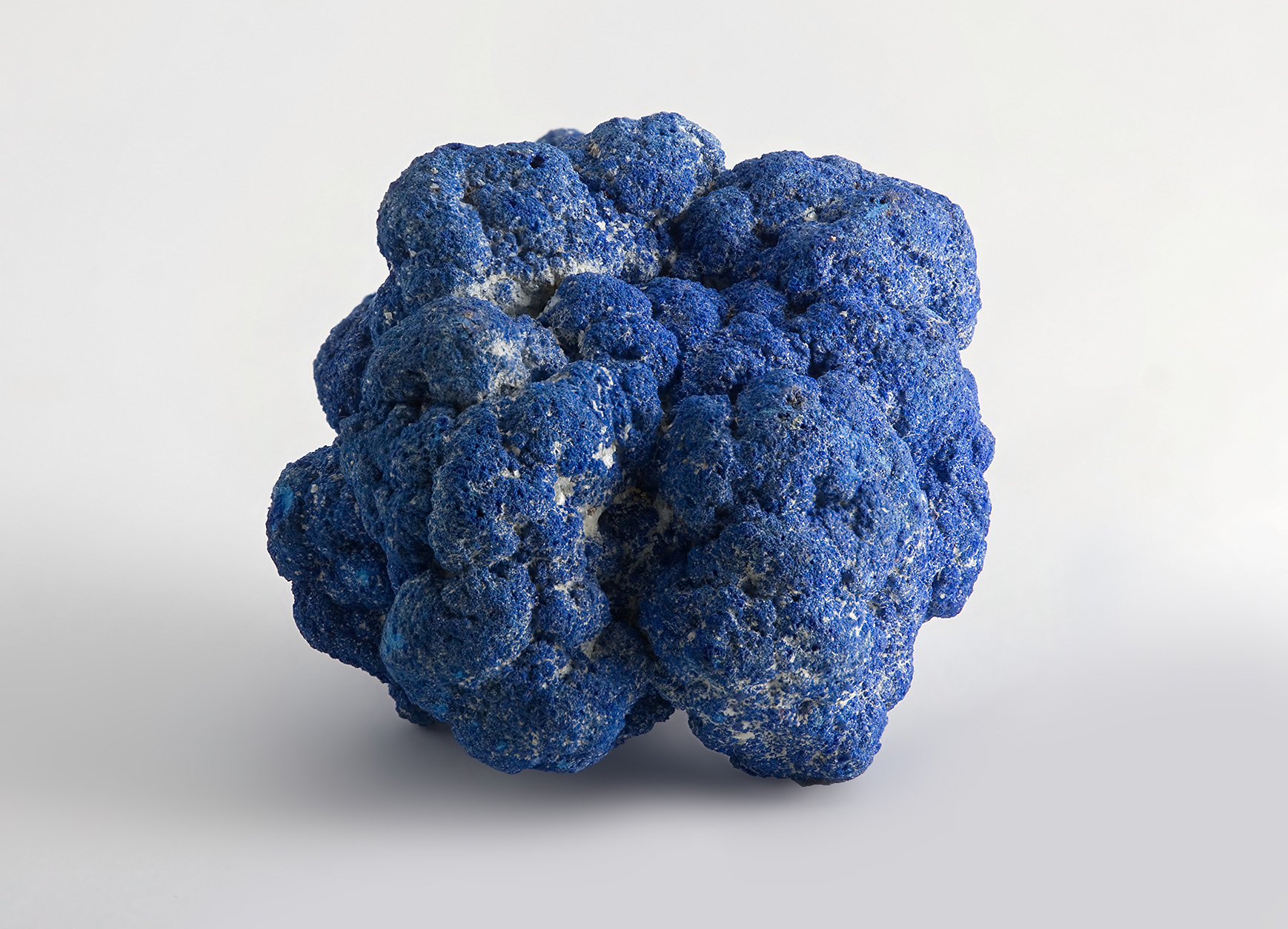
Azurite from Burra Mine, South Australia

Azurite is found in the same geologic settings as its sister mineral, malachite, though it is usually less abundant. Both minerals occur widely as supergene copper minerals, formed in the oxidized zone of copper ore deposits. Here they are associated with cuprite, native copper, and various iron oxide minerals. It also often occurs along with quartz, cerussite, chrysocolla, olivenite and baryte.

Fine specimens can be found at many locations. Among the best specimens are found at Bisbee, Arizona, and nearby locations, and have included clusters of crystals several inches long and spherical aggregates and rosettes up to 2 inches (51 mm) in diameter. Similar rosettes are found at Chessy, Rhône, France. The best crystals, up to 10 inches (250 mm) in length, are found at Tsumeb, Namibia. Other notable occurrences are in Utah; Mexico; the Ural and Altai Mountains; Sardinia; Laurion, Greece; Wallaroo, South Australia; Brazil and Broken Hill.

== Uses ==
=== Pigments ===
Azurite is unstable in air, however it was used as a blue pigment in antiquity. Azurite is naturally occurring in Sinai and the Eastern Desert of Egypt. It was reported by F. C. J. Spurrell (1895) in the following examples; a shell used as a pallet in a Fourth Dynasty (2613 to 2494 BCE) context in Meidum, a cloth over the face of a Fifth Dynasty (2494 to 2345 BCE) mummy also at Meidum and a number of Eighteenth Dynasty (1543–1292 BCE) wall paintings. Depending on the degree of fineness to which it was ground, and its basic content of copper carbonate, it gave a wide range of blues. It has been known as mountain blue, Armenian stone, and azurro della Magna (blue from Germany in Italian). When mixed with oil it turns slightly green. When mixed with egg yolk it turns green-grey. It is also known by the names blue bice and blue verditer, though verditer usually refers to a pigment made by chemical process. Older examples of azurite pigment may show a more greenish tint due to weathering into malachite. Much azurite was mislabeled lapis lazuli, a term applied to many blue pigments. As chemical analysis of paintings from the Middle Ages improves, azurite is being recognized as a major source of the blues used by medieval painters. Lapis lazuli (the pigment ultramarine) was chiefly supplied from Afghanistan during the Middle Ages, whereas azurite was a common mineral in Europe at the time. Sizable deposits were found near Lyon, France. It was mined since the 12th century in Saxony, in the silver mines located there.

Heating can be used to distinguish azurite from purified natural ultramarine blue, a more expensive but more stable blue pigment, as described by Cennino D'Andrea Cennini. Ultramarine withstands heat, whereas azurite converts to black copper oxide. However, gentle heating of azurite produces a deep blue pigment used in Japanese painting techniques.

Azurite pigment can be synthesized by precipitating copper(II) hydroxide from a solution of copper(II) chloride with lime (calcium hydroxide) and treating the precipitate with a concentrated solution of potassium carbonate and lime. This pigment is likely to contain traces of basic copper(II) chlorides.

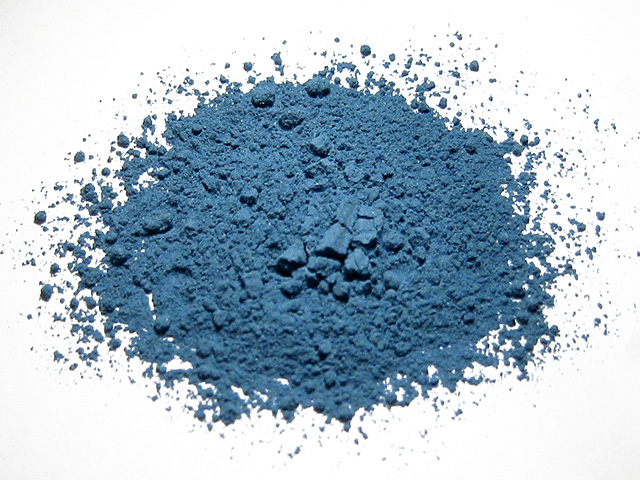
Ground azurite for use as a pigment

The background of Portrait of a Lady with a Squirrel and a Starling by Hans Holbein the Younger was painted with azurite

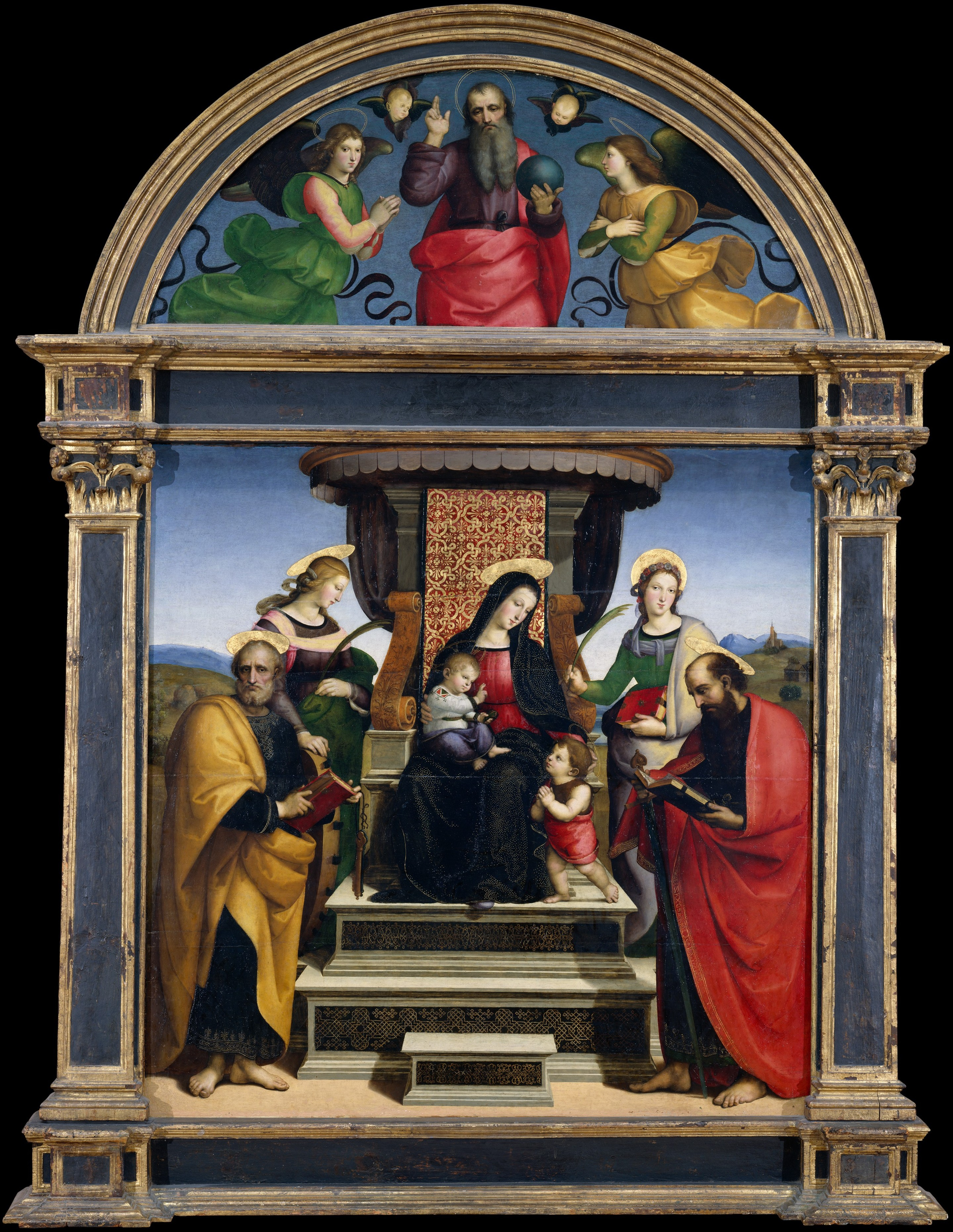
The greenish tint of the Madonna's mantle in Raphael's Madonna and Child Enthroned with Saints is due to azurite weathering to malachite

=== Jewelry ===
Azurite is used occasionally as beads and as jewelry, and also as an ornamental stone. However, its softness and tendency to lose its deep blue color as it weathers leaves it with fewer uses. Heating destroys azurite easily, so all mounting of azurite specimens must be done at room temperature.

=== Collecting ===
The intense color of azurite makes it a popular collector's stone. The notion that specimens must be carefully protected from bright light, heat, and open air to retain their intensity of color over time may be an urban legend. Paul E. Desautels, former curator of gems and minerals at the Smithsonian Institution, has written that azurite is stable under ordinary storage conditions.

=== Prospecting ===
While not a major ore of copper itself, the presence of azurite is a good surface indicator of the presence of weathered copper sulfide ores. It is usually found in association with the chemically similar malachite, producing a striking color combination of deep blue and bright green that is strongly indicative of the presence of copper ores.

== History ==
Azurite was known in the pre-classical ancient world. It was used in ancient Egypt as a pigment, obtained from mines in Sinai. Ancient Mesopotamian writers report the use of a special mortar and pestle for grinding it. It was also used in ancient Greece, for example on the Acropolis in Athens. It does not appear to have been used in ancient Roman wall paintings but Roman writers certainly knew about its use as a pigment. The fusing of glass and azurite was developed in ancient Mesopotamia.

== Gallery ==
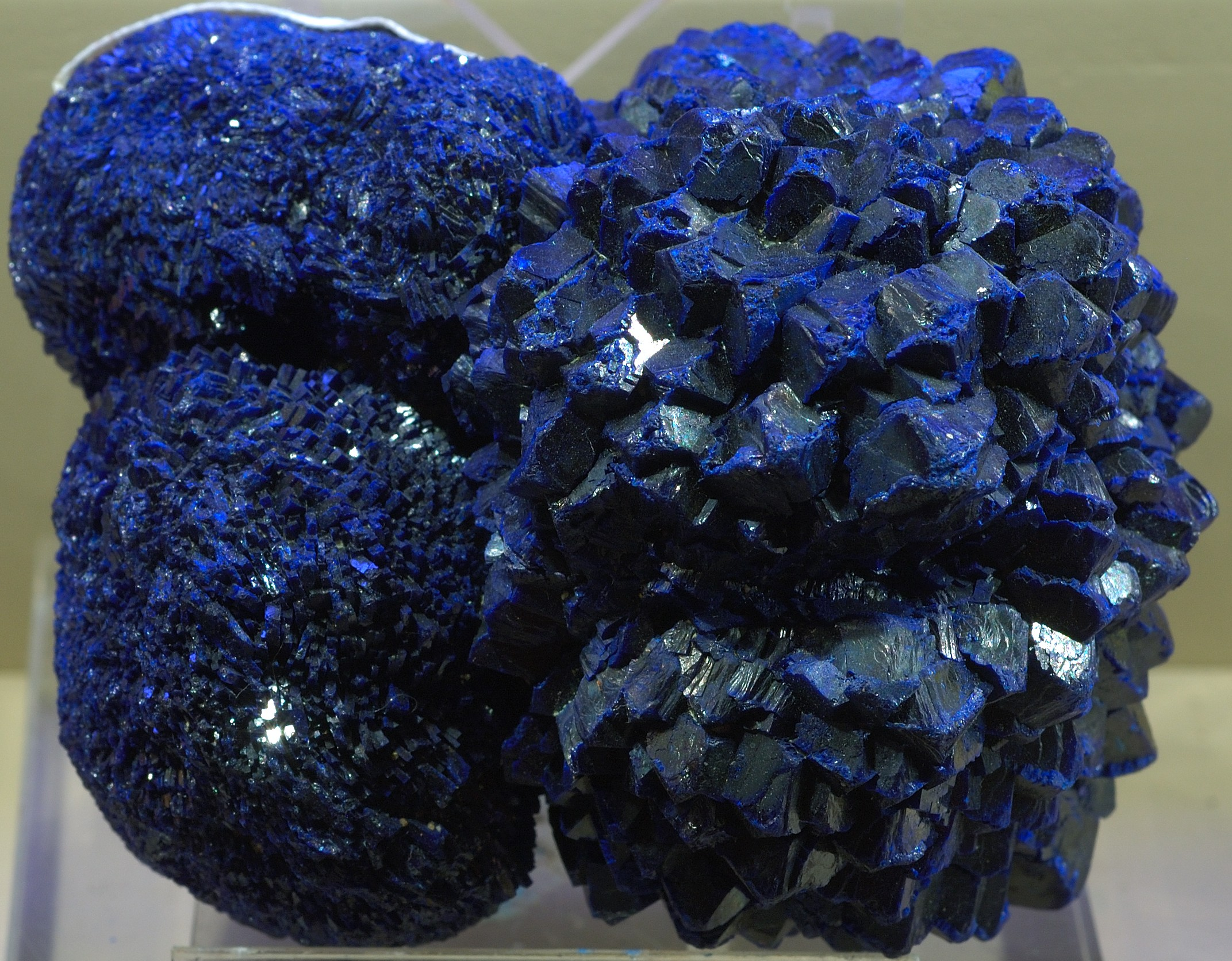
Azurite crystals from China

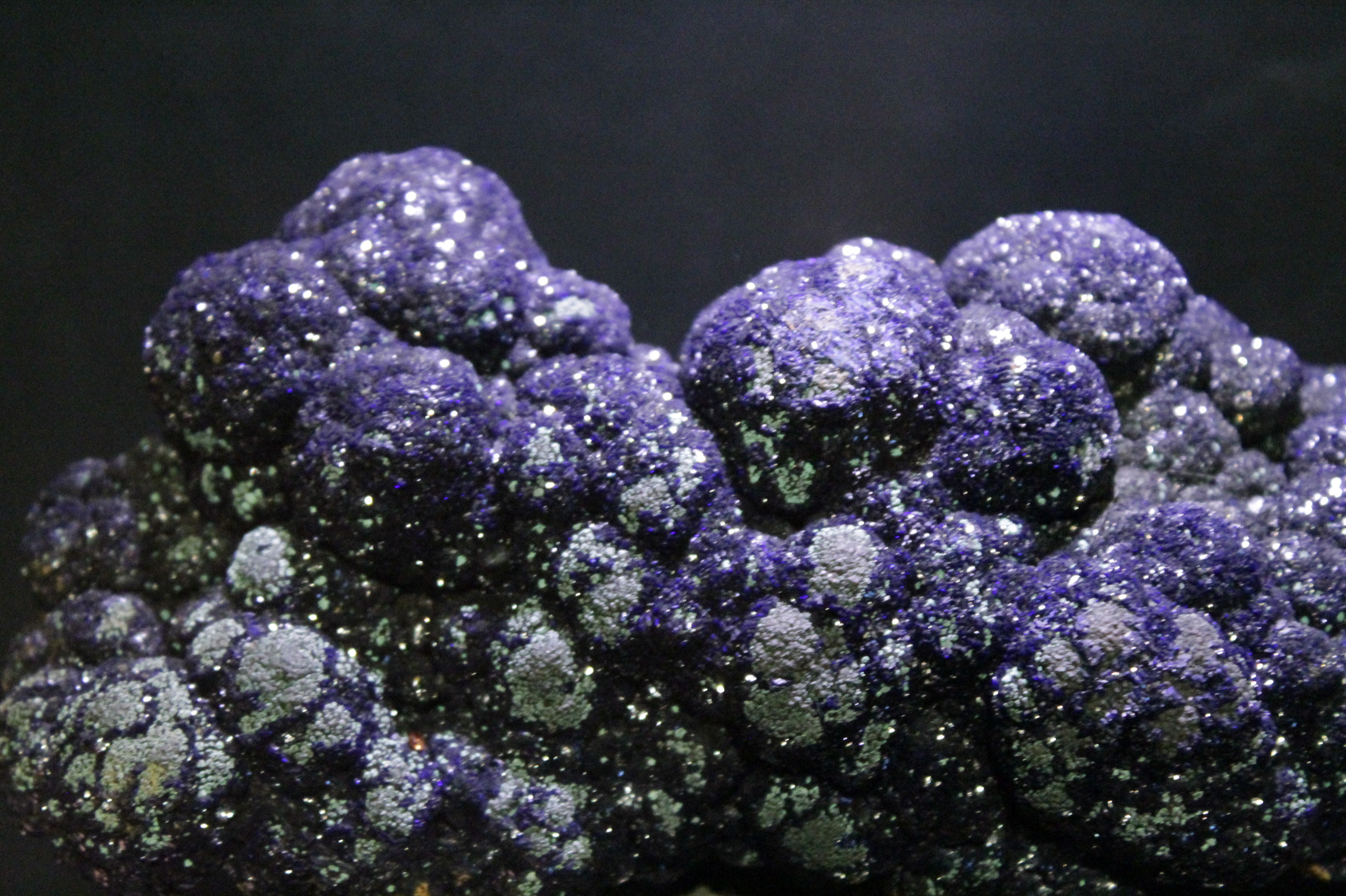
Azurite from Arizona, collected by Dr John Hunter in the 18th century, Hunterian Museum, Glasgow

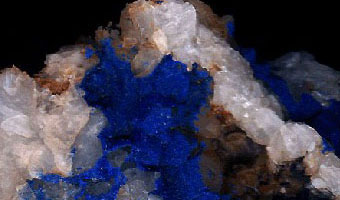
Fresh, unweathered azurite crystals showing the deep blue of unaltered azurite. From Špania Dolina, Slovakia

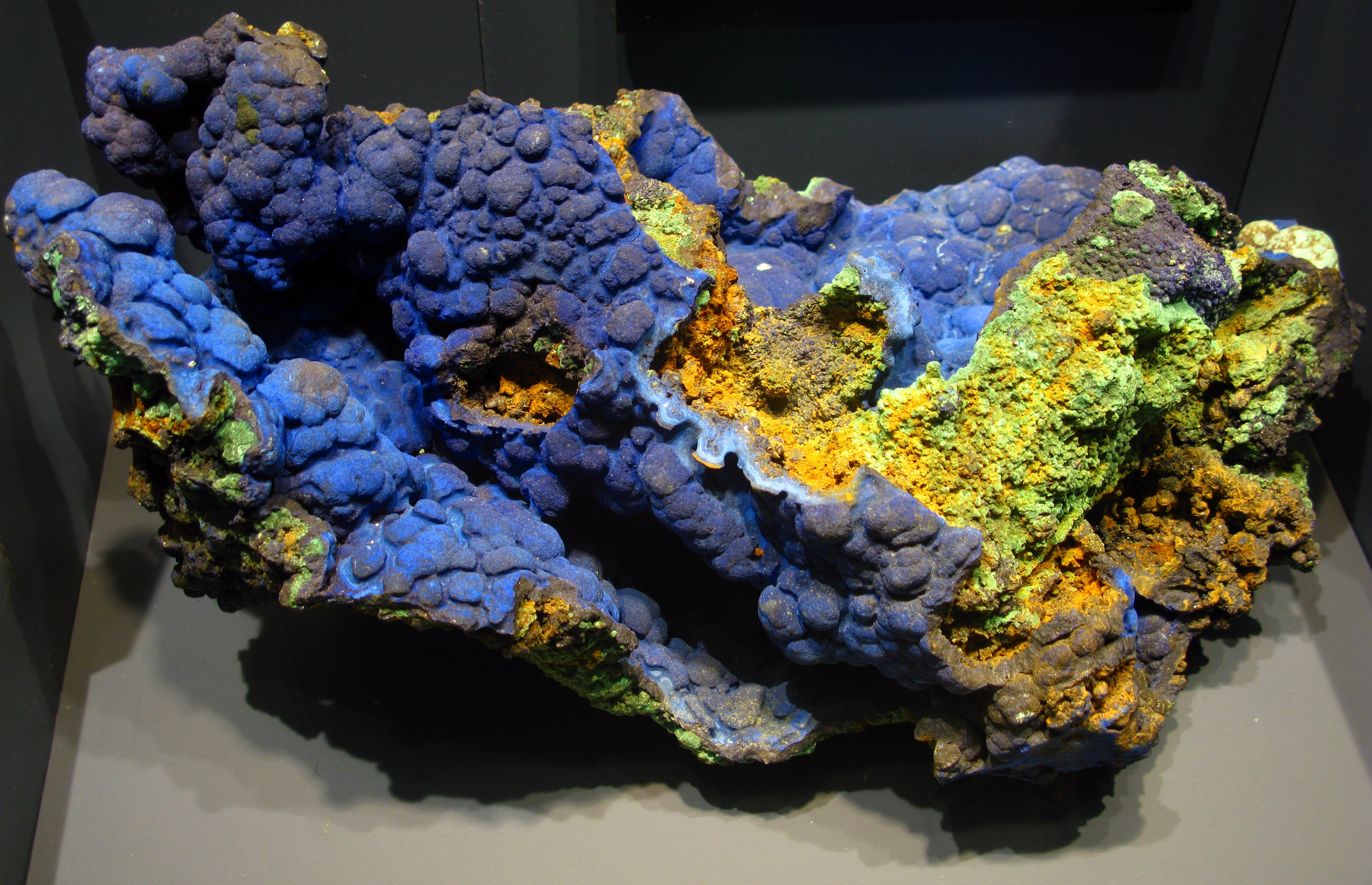
Azurite with Malachite, Copper Queen mine, Bisbee, Arizona

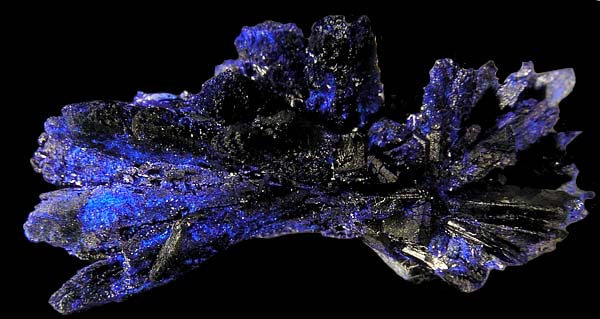
Azurite from Touissit, Morocco

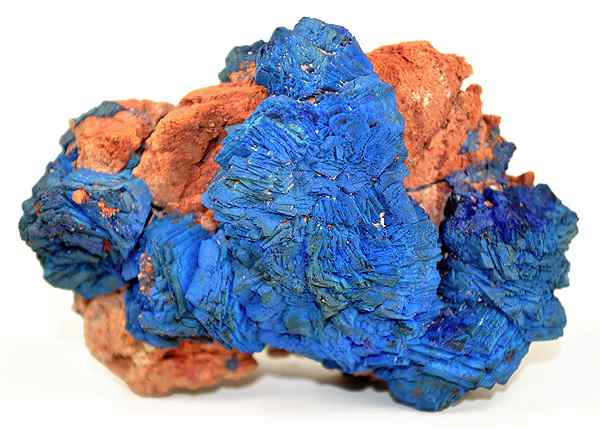
Azurite, Morenci, Arizona

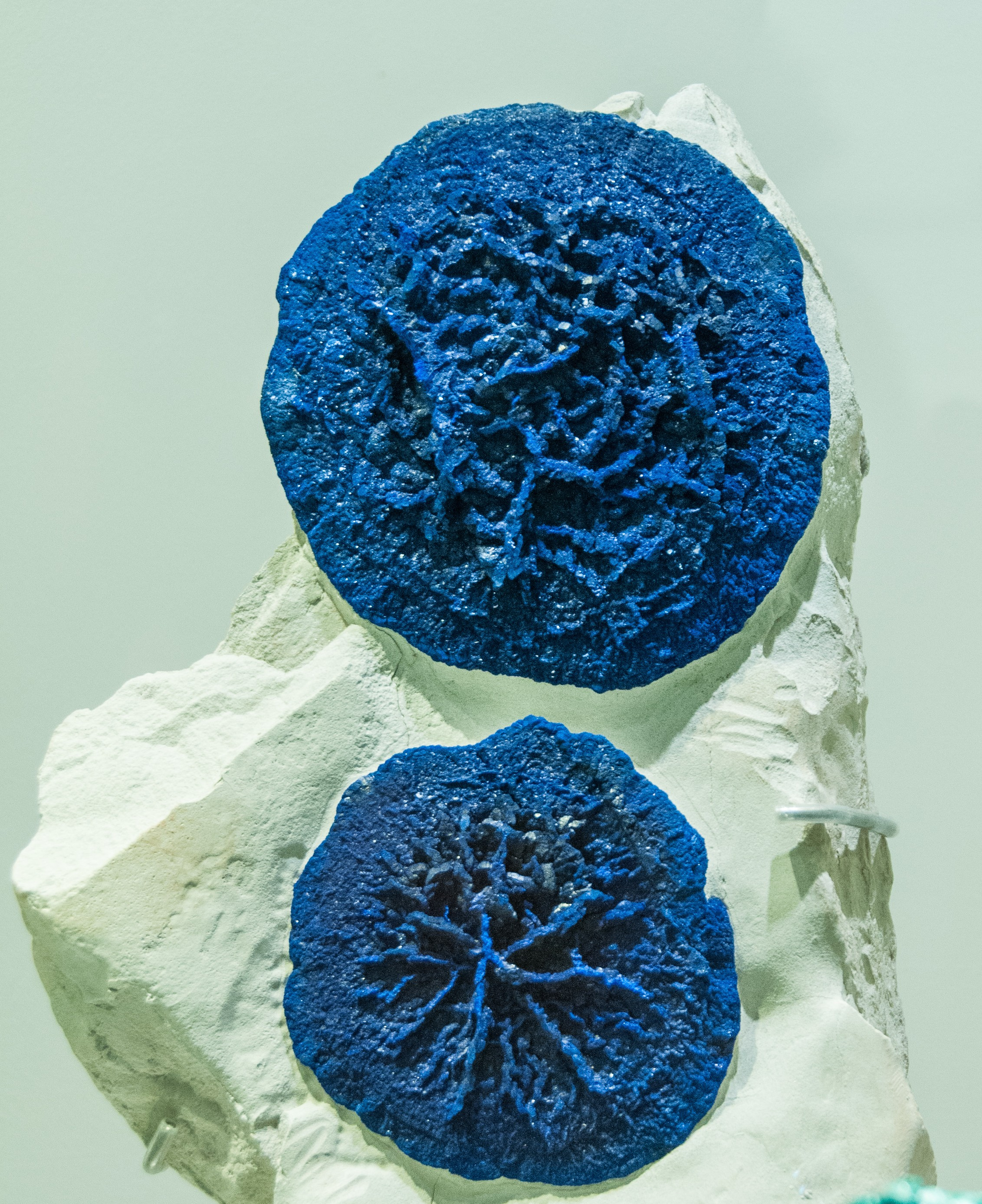
Azurite in siltstone, Malbunka mine, Northern Territory, Australia

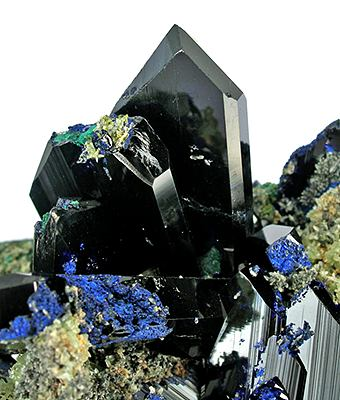
Azurite from Tsumeb, Namibia

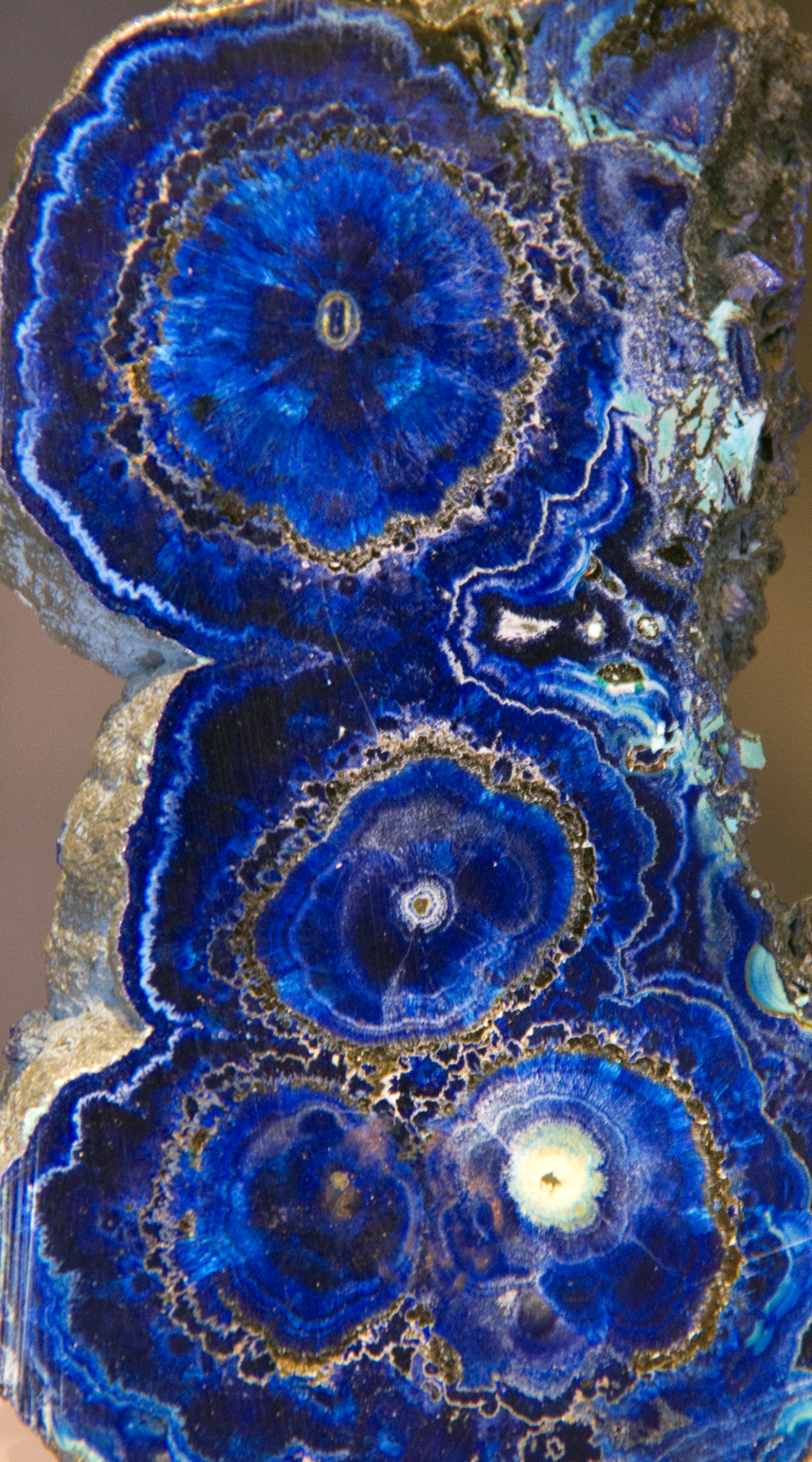
Azurite, cross-section through merged stalactites, Bisbee, Arizona

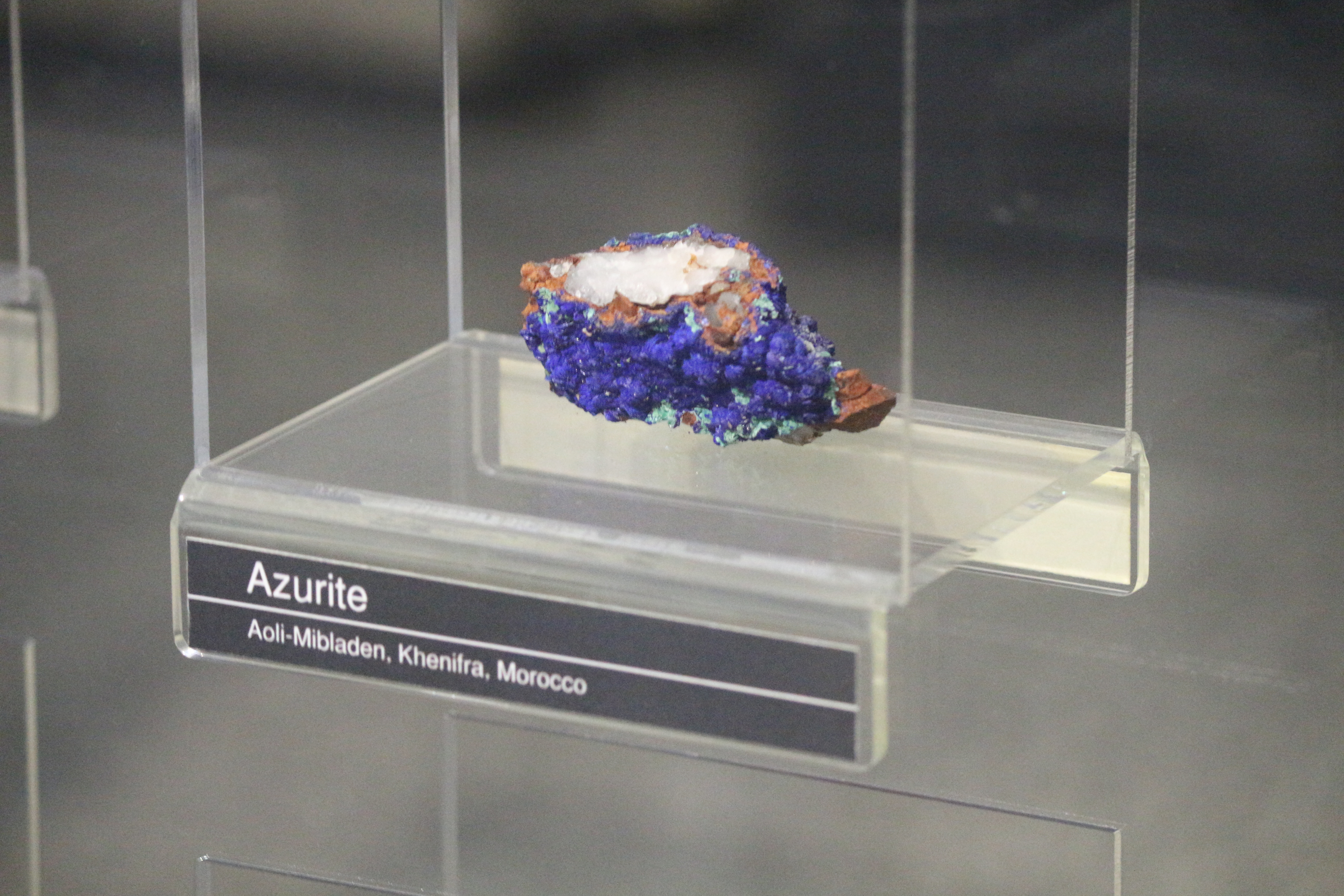
Azurite from Bandung, Indonesia

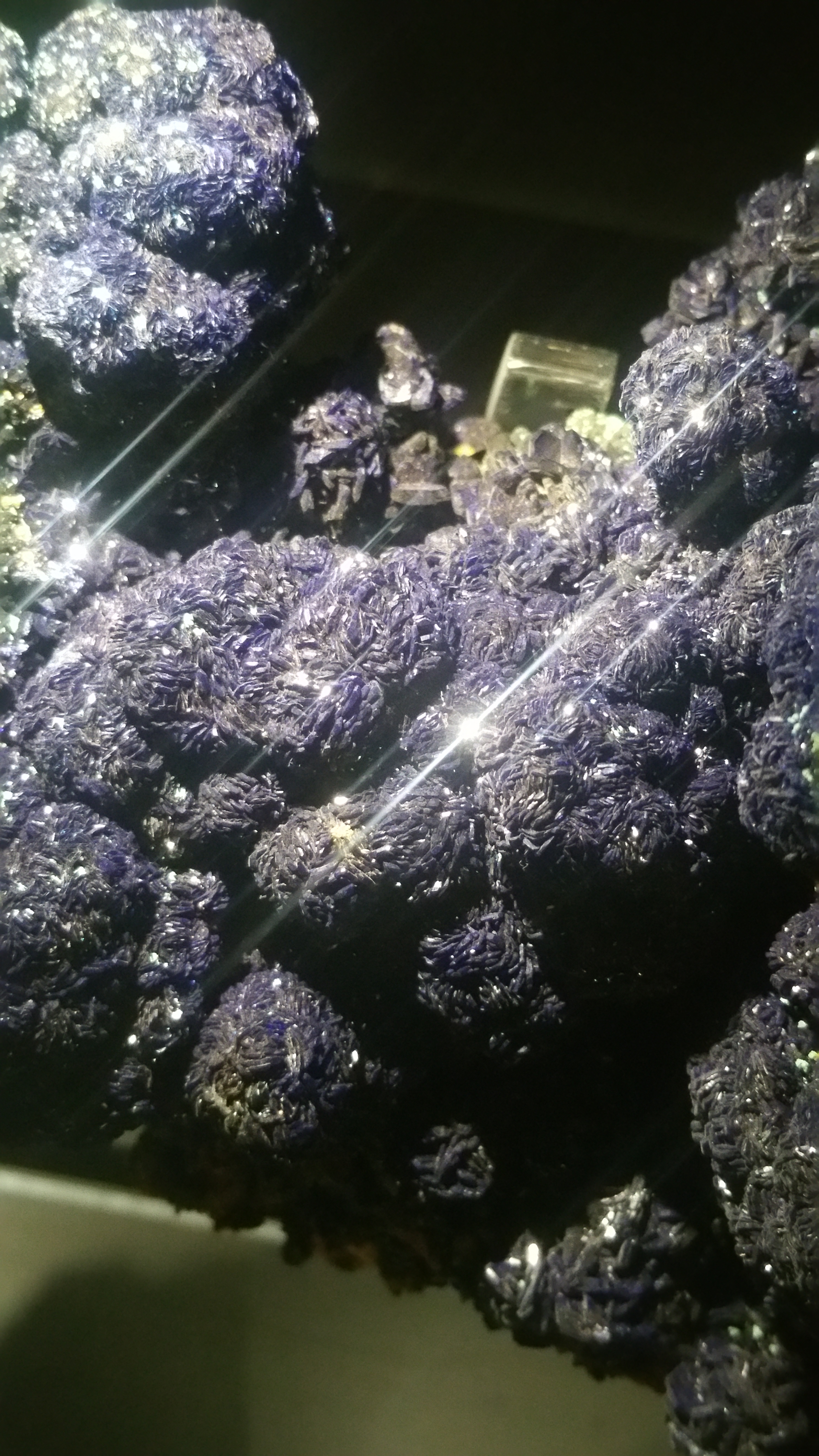
Azurite crystal, from the minerals collection at the Natural History Museum, London.

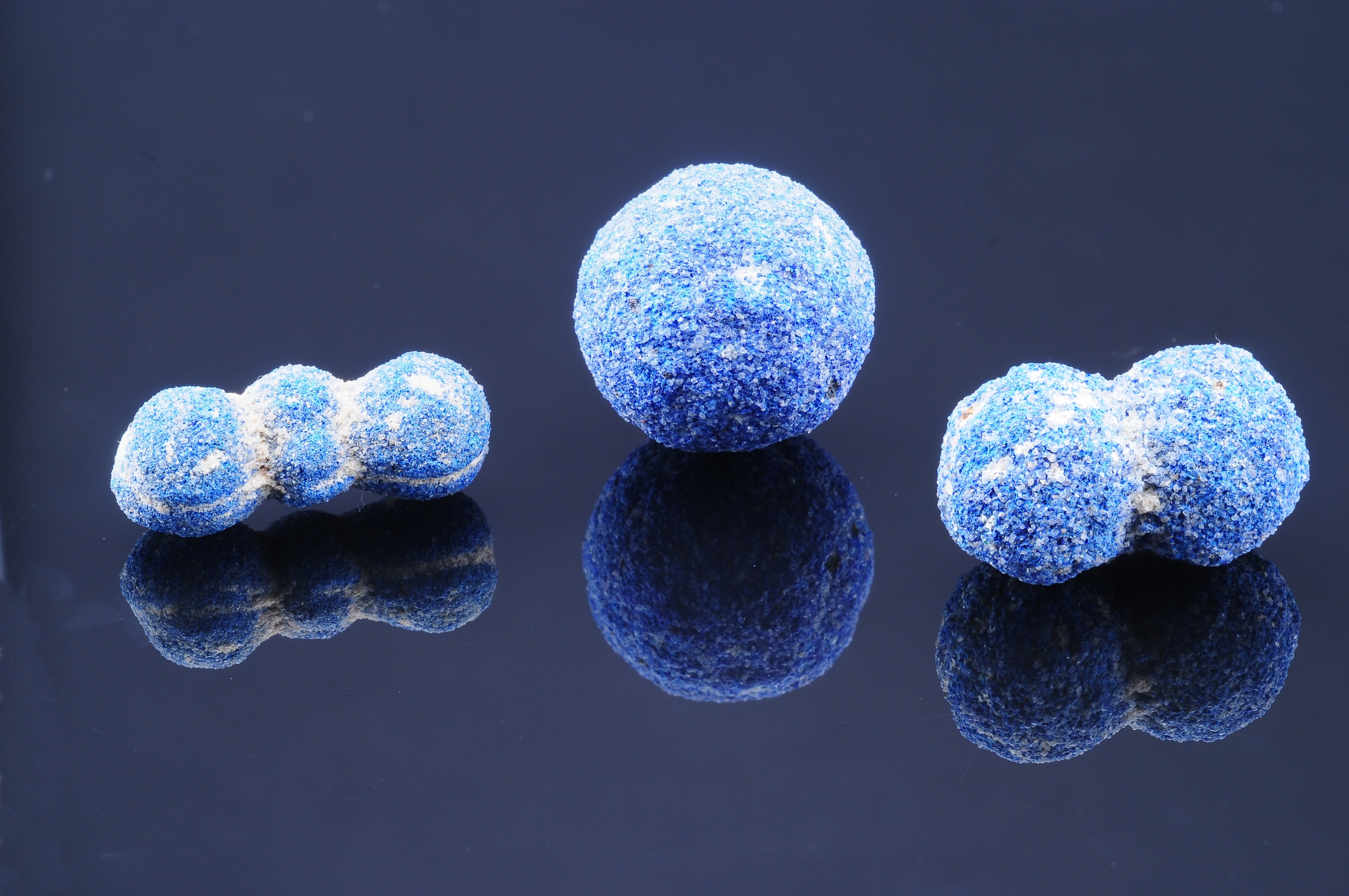
Spheroidal azurite specimens from Utah

== See also ==
- Basic copper carbonate
- Blue pigments
- List of inorganic pigments
- List of minerals
