= Copper(II) carbonate =

Chemical compound

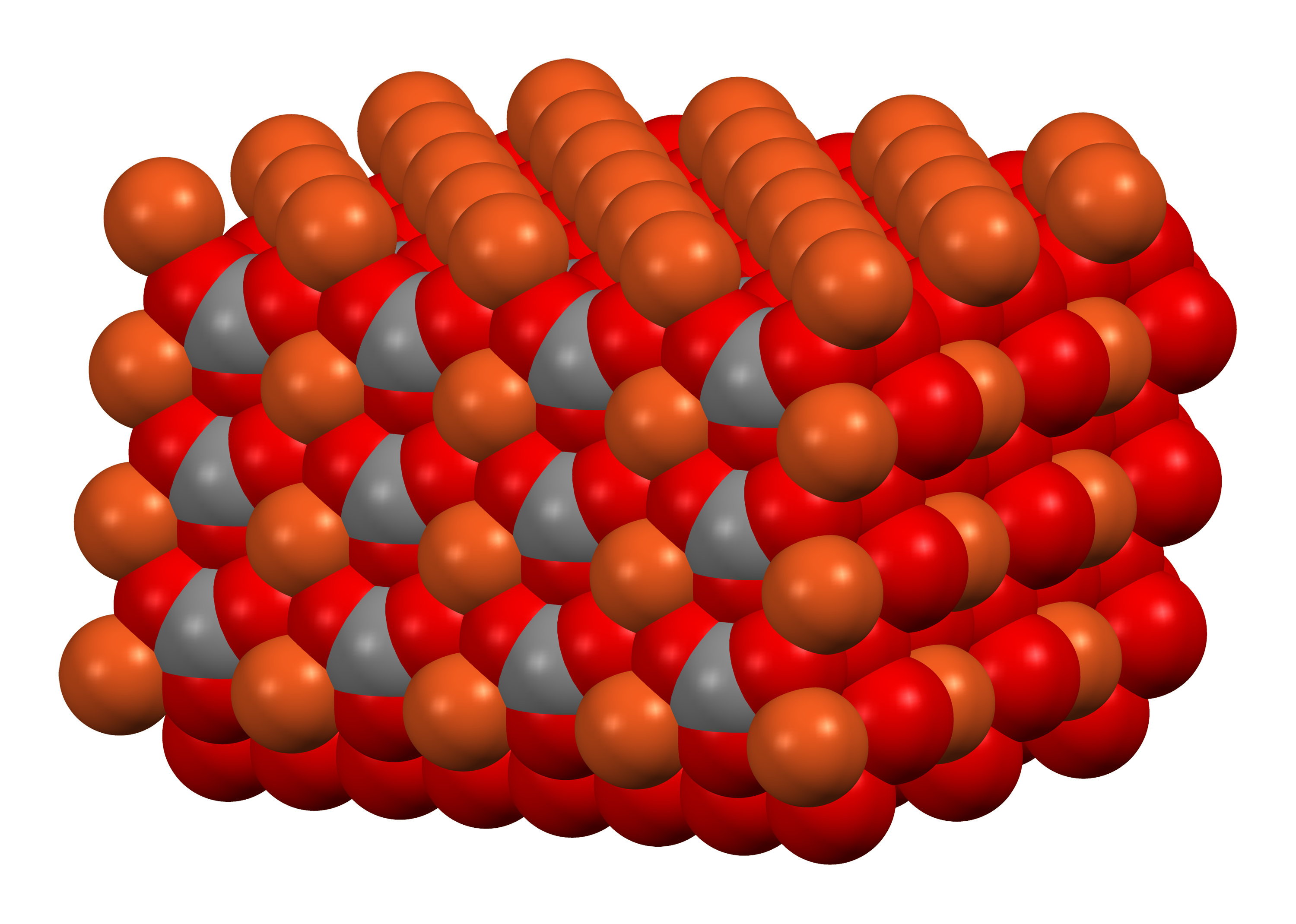

Names
- IUPAC name Copper(II) carbonate
- Other names Cupric carbonate, neutral copper carbonate

Identifiers
CAS Number	1184-64-1
3D model (JSmol)	Interactive image
ChemSpider	13799
ECHA InfoCard	100.013.338
EC Number	214-671-4
PubChem CID	14452
UNII	9AOA5F11GJ
CompTox Dashboard (EPA)	DTXSID6034471
- InChI: InChI=1S/CH2O3.Cu/c2-1(3)4;/h(H2,2,3,4);/q;+2/p-2 Key: GEZOTWYUIKXWOA-UHFFFAOYSA-L
- SMILES: C(=O)([O-])[O-].[Cu+2]

Properties
Chemical formula	CuCO_{3}
Molar mass	123.5549 g/mol
Appearance	Green or blue powder
Solubility in water	insoluble
Solubility product (K_{sp})	10^{−11.45 ± 0.10} at 25 °C (77 °F) for material synthesized at high pressure.

Structure
Space group	Pa-C^{2}_{s} (7)
Lattice constant	a = 6.092 Å, b = 4.493 Å, c = 7.030 Å α = 90°, β = 101,34°°, γ = 90°
Coordination geometry	5

Hazards
Flash point	Non-flammable

Related compounds
Other anions	Copper(II) sulfate
Other cations	Nickel(II) carbonate Zinc carbonate
- Except where otherwise noted, data are given for materials in their standard state (at 25 °C [77 °F], 100 kPa). (what is ?) Infobox references

Copper(II) carbonate or cupric carbonate is a chemical compound with formula CuCO_{3}. At ambient temperatures, it is an ionic solid (a salt) consisting of copper(II) cations Cu^{2+} and carbonate anions CO^{2−}_{3}.

This compound is rarely encountered because it is difficult to prepare and readily reacts with moisture from the air. The terms "copper carbonate", "copper(II) carbonate", and "cupric carbonate" almost always refer (even in chemistry texts) to a basic copper carbonate (or copper(II) carbonate hydroxide), such as Cu_{2}(OH)_{2}CO_{3} (which occurs naturally as the mineral malachite) or Cu_{3}(OH)_{2}(CO_{3})_{2} (azurite). For this reason, the qualifier neutral may be used instead of "basic" to refer specifically to CuCO_{3}.

== Properties ==
The stability of dry CuCO_{3} depends critically on the partial pressure of carbon dioxide (p_{CO2}). It is stable for months in dry air, but decomposes slowly into CuO and CO_{2} if p_{CO2} is less than 0.11 atm (11 kPa).

In the presence of water or moist air at 25 °C (77 °F), CuCO_{3} is stable only for p_{CO2} above 4.57 atm (463 kPa) and pH between about 4 and 8. Below that partial pressure, it reacts with water to form a basic carbonate (azurite, Cu_{3}(CO_{3})_{2}(OH)_{2}).

3 CuCO_{3} + H_{2}O → Cu_{3}(CO_{3})_{2}(OH)_{2} + CO_{2}

In highly basic solutions, the complex anion Cu(CO_{3})^{2−}_{2} is formed instead.

The solubility product of the true copper(II) carbonate was measured by Reiterer and others as pK_{so} = 11.45 ± 0.10 at 25 °C (77 °F).

== Structure ==
In the crystal structure of CuCO_{3}, copper adopts a distorted square pyramidal coordination environment with coordination number 5. Each carbonate ion bonds to 5 copper centres.

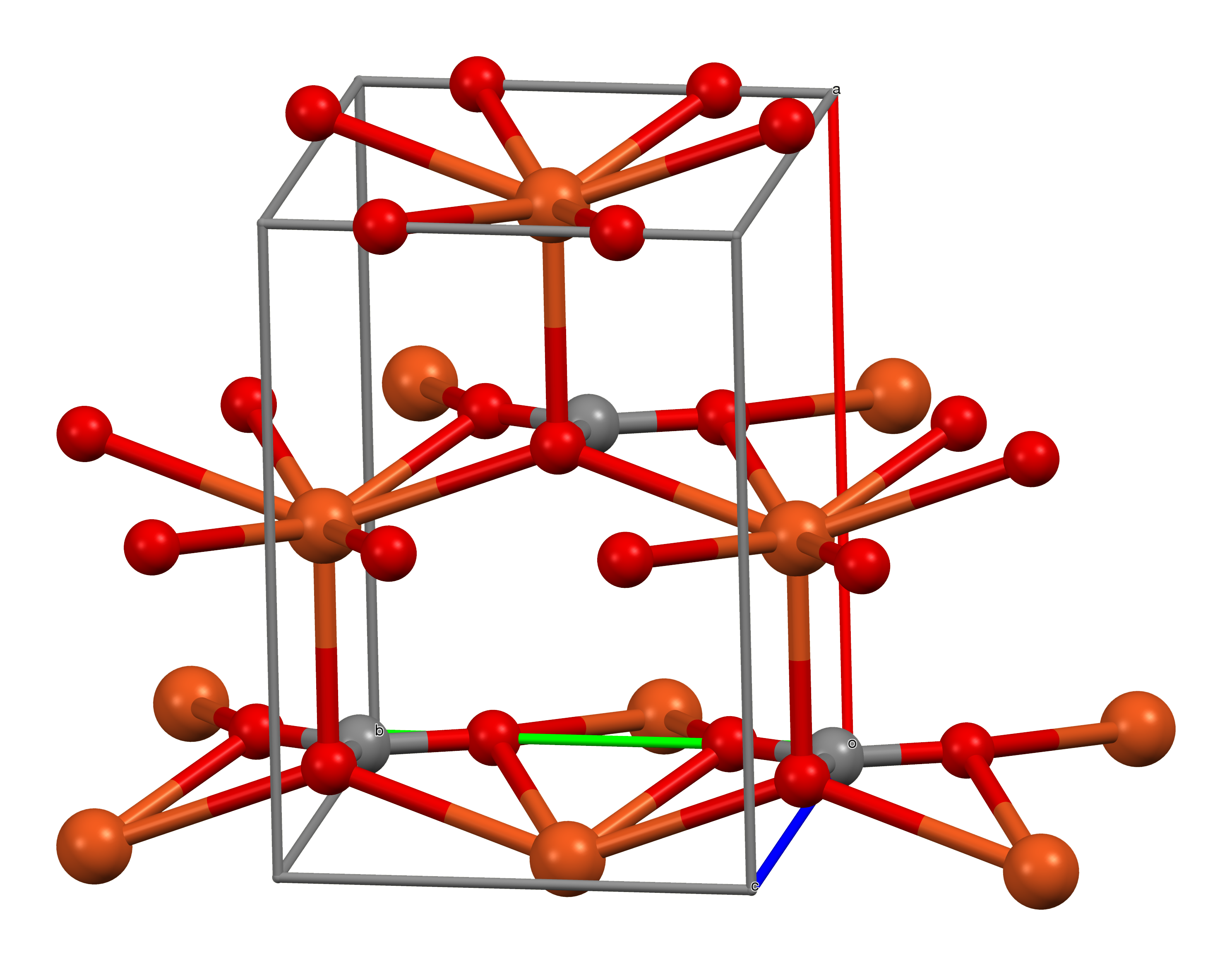
Unit cell of CuCO_{3}

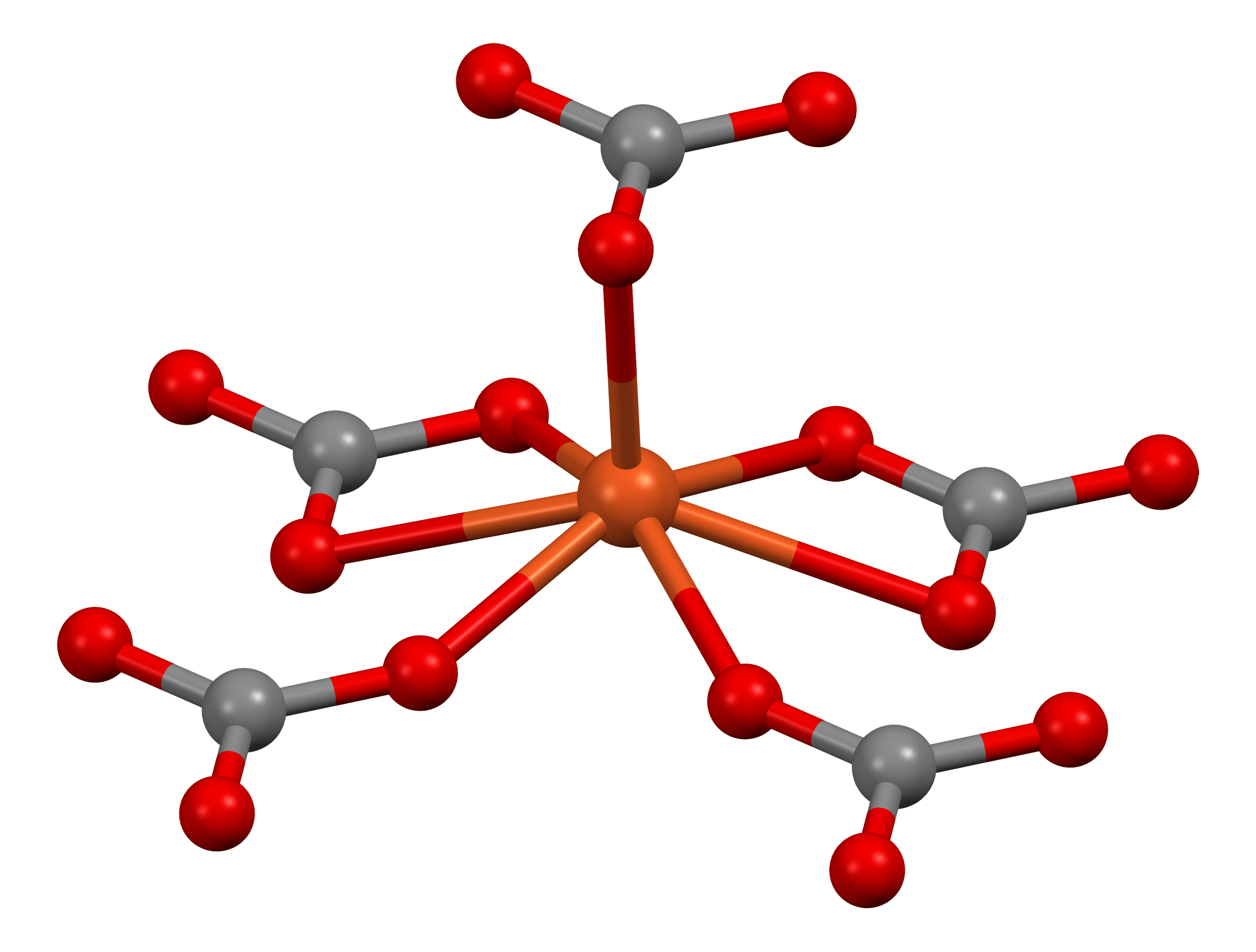
Copper coordination environment

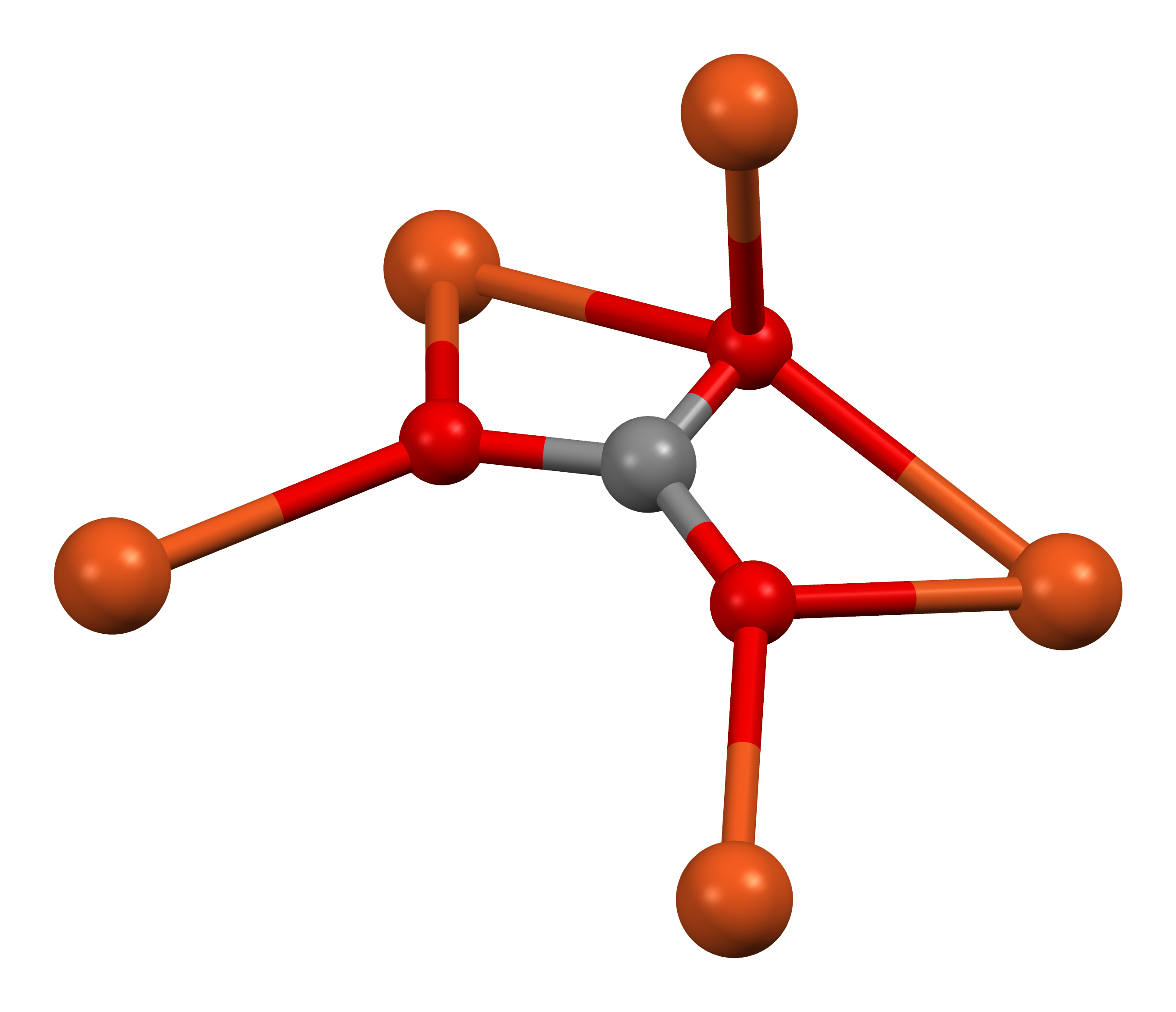
Carbonate coordination environment

== Preparation ==
Reactions that may be expected to yield CuCO_{3}, such as mixing solutions of copper(II) sulfate CuSO_{4} and sodium carbonate in ambient conditions, yield instead a basic carbonate and CO_{2}, due to the great affinity of the Cu^{2+} ion for the hydroxide anion HO^{−}.

Thermal decomposition of the basic carbonate at atmospheric pressure yields copper(II) oxide rather than the carbonate.

In 1960, C. W. F. T. Pistorius claimed synthesis by heating basic copper carbonate at 180 °C (356 °F) in an atmosphere of carbon dioxide at 450 atm (46 MPa) and water at 50 atm (5.1 MPa) for 36 hours. The bulk of the products was well-crystallized malachite Cu_{2}CO_{3}(OH)_{2}, but a small yield of a rhombohedral substance was also obtained, claimed to be CuCO_{3}. However, this synthesis was apparently not reproduced.

Reliable synthesis of true copper(II) carbonate was reported for the first time in 1973 by Hartmut Ehrhardt et al. The compound was obtained as a gray powder, by heating basic copper carbonate in an atmosphere of carbon dioxide (produced by the decomposition of silver oxalate, Ag_{2}C_{2}O_{4}) at 500 °C (932 °F) and 20,000 atm (2 GPa). The compound was determined to have a monoclinic structure.
