= Basic copper carbonate =

Chemical compound

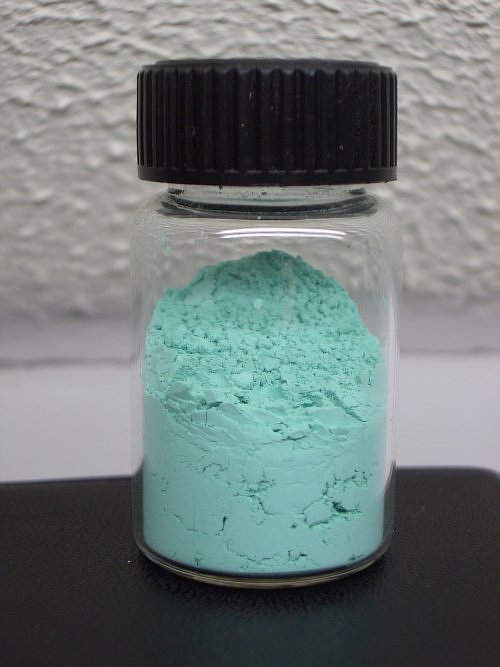
- Basic copper carbonate

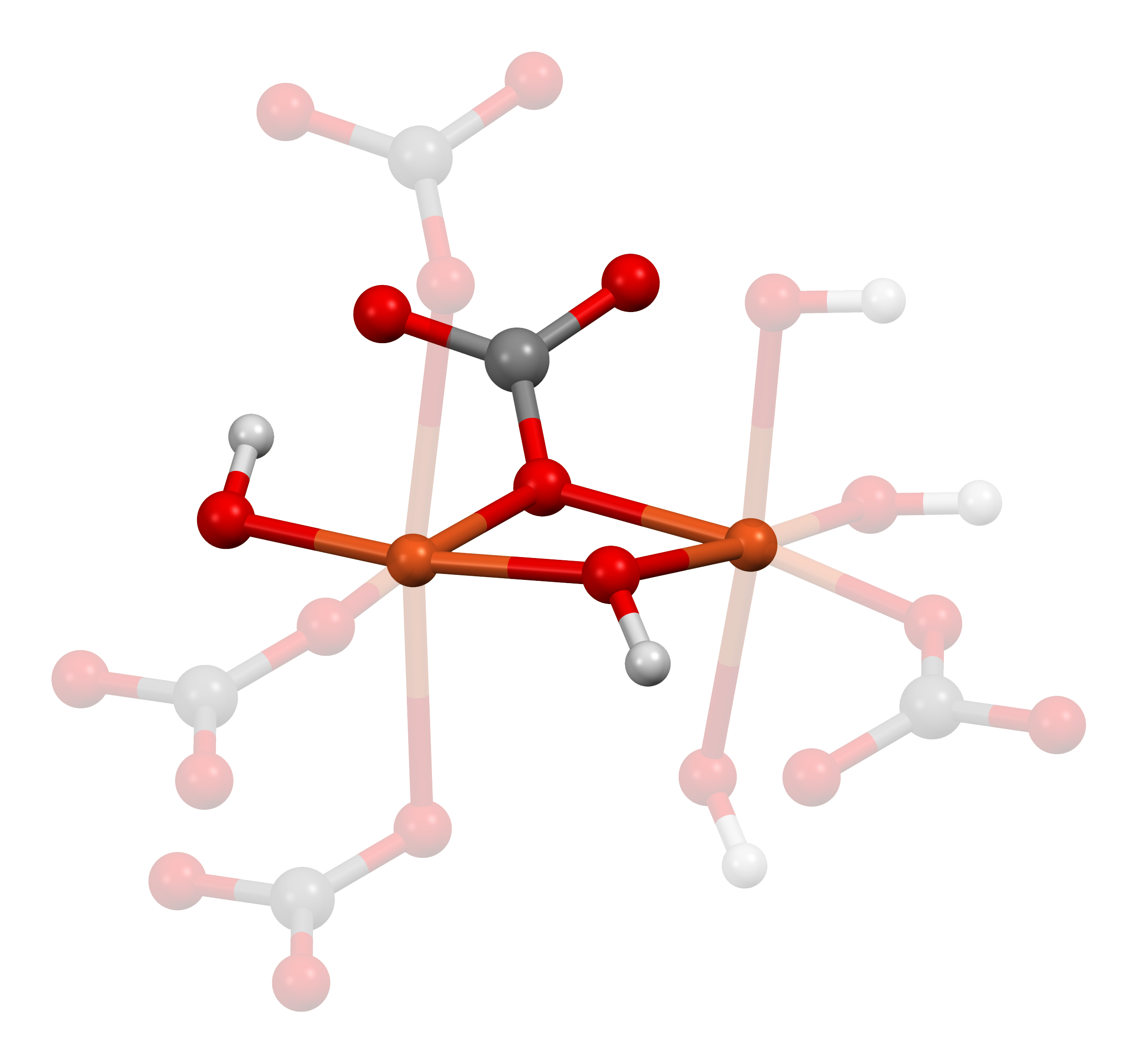
- Ball-and-stick model of part of the crystal structure of malachite, highlighting the formula unit

Names
- IUPAC name Dicopper carbonate dihydroxide
- Other names: Copper carbonate hydroxide; Copper carbonate; Cupric carbonate

Identifiers
CAS Number	12069-69-1
3D model (JSmol)	Interactive image
ChemSpider	23796
ECHA InfoCard	100.031.909
PubChem CID	25503
UNII	GIK928GH0Y
CompTox Dashboard (EPA)	DTXSID1047077
- InChI: InChI=1S/CH2O3.2Cu.2H2O/c2-1(3)4;;;;/h(H2,2,3,4);;;2*1H2/q;2*+2;;/p-4 Key: ZMMDPCMYTCRWFF-UHFFFAOYSA-J; InChI=1/CH2O3.2Cu.2H2O/c2-1(3)4;;;;/h(H2,2,3,4);;;2*1H2/q;2*+2;;/p-4 Key: ZMMDPCMYTCRWFF-XBHQNQODAP
- SMILES: C(=O)([O-])[O-].[OH-].[OH-].[Cu+2].[Cu+2]

Properties
Chemical formula	Cu_{2}(OH)_{2}CO_{3}
Molar mass	221.114 g/mol
Appearance	green powder
Density	4 g/cm^{3}
Melting point	200 °C (392 °F; 473 K)
Boiling point	290 °C (554 °F; 563 K) decomposes
Solubility in water	insoluble
Solubility product (K_{sp})	7.08·10^{−9}

Thermochemistry
Std molar entropy (S^{⦵}_{298})	88 J/mol·K
Std enthalpy of formation (Δ_{f}H^{⦵}_{298})	−595 kJ/mol

Hazards
- GHS labelling
Pictograms	(GHS07: Exclamation mark)
Signal word	Warning
Hazard statements	H302, H315, H319, H335
Precautionary statements	P261, P305+P351+P338
- Lethal dose or concentration (LD, LC)
LD_{50} (median dose)	159 mg/kg (rat, oral)
- NIOSH (US health exposure limits)
PEL (Permissible)	TWA 1 mg/m^{3} (as Cu)
REL (Recommended)	TWA 1 mg/m^{3} (as Cu)
IDLH (Immediate danger)	TWA 100 mg/m^{3} (as Cu)
Safety data sheet (SDS)	Oxford MSDS
- Except where otherwise noted, data are given for materials in their standard state (at 25 °C [77 °F], 100 kPa). verify (what is ?) Infobox references

Basic copper carbonate is a chemical compound, more properly called copper(II) carbonate hydroxide. It can be classified as a coordination polymer or a salt. It consists of copper(II) bonded to carbonate and hydroxide with formula Cu_{2}(CO_{3})(OH)_{2}. It is a green solid that occurs in nature as the mineral malachite. It has been used since antiquity as a pigment, and it is still used as such in artist paints, sometimes called verditer, green bice, or mountain green.

Sometimes basic copper carbonate refers to Cu_{3}(CO_{3})_{2}(OH)_{2}, a blue crystalline solid also known as the mineral azurite. It too has been used as pigment, sometimes under the name mountain blue or blue verditer.

Both malachite and azurite can be found in the verdigris patina that is found on weathered brass, bronze, and copper. The composition of the patina can vary, in a maritime environment depending on the environment a basic chloride may be present, in an urban environment basic sulfates may be present.

This compound is often improperly called (even in chemistry articles) copper carbonate, cupric carbonate, and similar names. The true (neutral) copper(II) carbonate CuCO_{3} is not known to occur naturally. It is decomposed by water or moisture from the air. It was synthesized only in 1973 by high temperature and very high pressures.

== Preparation ==
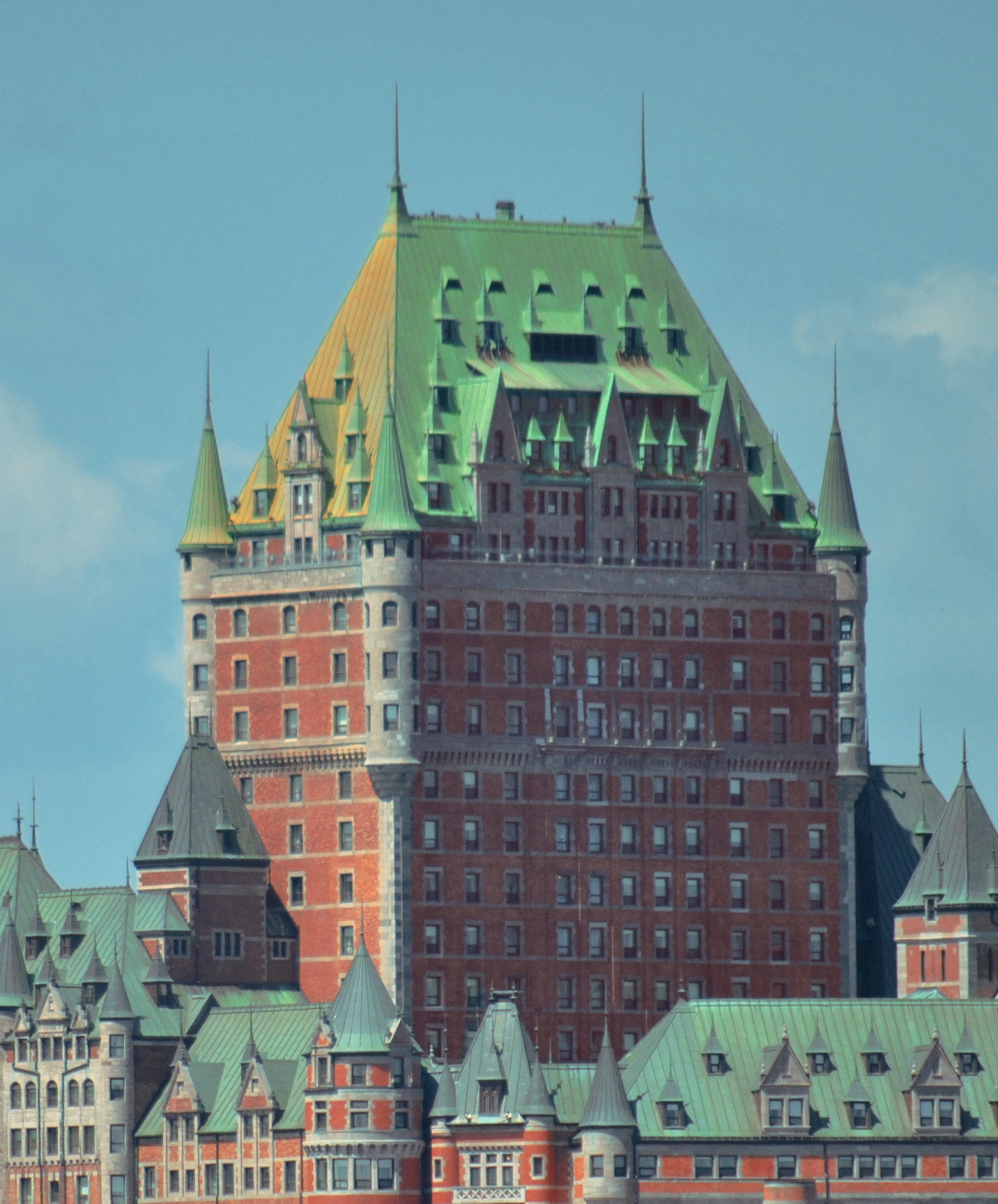
Basic copper(II) carbonate patina on roofs of Château Frontenac.

Basic copper carbonate is prepared by combining aqueous solutions of copper(II) sulfate and sodium carbonate. Basic copper carbonate precipitates from the solution, with release of carbon dioxide CO_{2}:

2CuSO_{4} + 2Na_{2}CO_{3} + H_{2}O → Cu_{2}(OH)_{2}CO_{3} + 2Na_{2}SO_{4} + CO_{2}

Basic copper carbonate can also be prepared by treating aqueous solutions of copper(II) sulfate with sodium bicarbonate.

Copper(II) sulfate may also be substituted with Copper(II) chloride.

== Uses ==
Basic copper carbonate is used to remove thiols and hydrogen sulfide from some gas streams, a process called "sweetening". Like many other copper compounds, it also has been used as an algaecide, wood preservative and similar applications. It is a precursor to various catalysts and copper soaps.

Both malachite and azurite, as well as synthetic basic copper carbonate have been used as pigments. One example of the use of both azurite and its artificial form blue verditer is the portrait of the family of Balthazar Gerbier by Peter Paul Rubens. The green skirt of Deborah Kip is painted in azurite, smalt, blue verditer (artificial form of azurite), yellow ochre, lead-tin-yellow and yellow lake. The green color is achieved by mixing blue and yellow pigments.

== Reactions ==
Basic copper carbonate is decomposed by acids, such as solutions of hydrochloric acid HCl, into the copper(II) salt and carbon dioxide.

In 1794 the French chemist Joseph Louis Proust (1754–1826) thermally decomposed copper carbonate to CO_{2} and CuO, cupric oxide.

The basic copper carbonates, malachite and azurite, both decompose forming H_{2}O, CO_{2}, and CuO, cupric oxide.
