= List of copper salts =

Copper is a chemical element with the symbol Cu (from Latin: cuprum) and the atomic number of 29. It is easily recognisable, due to its distinct red-orange color. Copper also has a range of different organic and inorganic salts, having varying oxidation states ranging from (0,I) to (III). These salts (mostly the (II) salts) are often blue to green in color, rather than the orange color copper is known for. Despite being considered a semi-noble metal, copper is one of the most common salt-forming transition metals, along with iron.

== Copper(0,I) salts ==
Name	Chemical Formula	Anion	Image
Copper silicide	Cu_{5}Si	Silicide (silane)	

== Copper(I) salts ==
Name	Chemical Formula	Anion	Image
Copper(I) oxide	Cu_{2}O	Oxide (oxygen)	
Copper(I) chloride	CuCl	Chloride (hydrochloric acid)	
Copper(I) iodide	CuI	Iodide (hydroiodic acid)	
Copper(I) cyanide	CuCN	Cyanide (hydrocyanic acid)	
Copper(I) thiocyanate	CuSCN	Thiocyanate (thiocyanic acid)	
Copper(I) sulfate	Cu_{2}SO_{4}	Sulfate (sulfuric acid)	
Copper(I) sulfide	Cu_{2}S	Sulfide (hydrogen sulfide)	
Copper(I) acetylide	Cu_{2}C_{2}	Acetylide (acetylene)	
Copper(I) bromide	CuBr	Bromide (hydrobromic acid)	
Copper(I) fluoride	CuF	Fluoride (hydrofluoric acid)	
Copper(I) hydroxide	CuOH	Hydroxide (water)	
Copper(I) hydride	CuH	Hydride (hydrogen gas)	
Copper(I) nitrate	CuNO_{3}	Nitrate (nitric acid)	
Copper(I) phosphide	Cu_{3}P	Phosphide (phosphine)	
Copper(I) thiophene-2-carboxylate	C_{5}H_{3}CuO_{2}S	thiophene-2-carboxylate (thiophene-2-carboxylic acid)	
Copper(I) t-butoxide	C_{16}H_{36}Cu_{4}O_{4}	t-butoxide (t-butyl alcohol)	
Copper tetraiodomercurate(II)	Cu_{2}HgI_{4}	Tetraiodomercurate(II)	

== Copper(II) salts ==
Name	Chemical Formula	Anion	Image
Copper(II) sulfate	CuSO_{4}	Sulfate (sulfuric acid)	
Copper(II) chloride	CuCl_{2}	Chloride (hydrochloric acid)	
Copper(II) hydroxide	Cu(OH)_{2}	Hydroxide (water)	
Copper(II) nitrate	Cu(NO_{3})_{2}	Nitrate (nitric acid)	
Copper(II) oxide	CuO	Oxide (oxygen)	
Copper(II) acetate	Cu(OAc)_{2}	Acetate (acetic acid)	
Copper(II) fluoride	CuF_{2}	Fluoride (hydrofluoric acid)	
Copper(II) bromide	CuBr_{2}	Bromide (bromine)	
Copper(II) carbonate	CuCO_{3}	Carbonate (carbonic acid)	
Copper(II) carbonate hydroxide	Cu_{2}CO_{3}(OH)_{2}	Hydroxide (water) Carbonate (carbonic acid)	
Copper(II) chlorate	Cu(ClO_{3})_{2}	Chlorate (chloric acid)	
Copper(II) arsenate	Cu_{3}(AsO_{4})_{2}	Arsenate (arsenic acid)	
Copper(II) azide	Cu(N_{3})_{2}	Azide (hydrazoic acid)	
Copper(II) acetylacetonate	Cu(O_{2}C_{5}H_{7})_{2}	Acetylacetonate (acetylacetone)	
Copper(II) aspirinate	C_{36}H_{28}Cu_{2}O_{16}	Acetylsalicylate (acetylsalicylic acid)	
Copper(II) cyanurate	CuC_{3}HN_{3}O_{3}	Cyanurate (cyanuric acid)	
Copper(II) glycinate	Cu(H_{2}NCH_{2}CO_{2})_{2}	Glycinate (glycine)	
Copper(II) phosphate	Cu_{3}(PO_{4})_{2}	Phosphate (phosphoric acid)	
Copper(II) perchlorate	Cu(ClO_{4})_{2}	Perchlorate (perchloric acid)	
Copper(II) selenite	CuSeO_{3}	Selenite (selenous acid)	
Copper(II) sulfide	CuS	Sulfide (hydrogen sulfide)	
Copper(II) thiocyanate	Cu(SCN)_{2}	Thiocyanate (thiocyanic acid)	
Copper(II) triflate	Cu(OSO_{2}CF_{3})_{2}	Triflate (triflic acid)	
Copper(II) tetrafluoroborate	Cu(BF_{4})_{2}	Tetrafluoroborate (tetrafluoroboric acid)	
Copper(II) acetate triarsenite (Paris Green)	Cu(C_{2}H_{3}O_{2})_{2}·3Cu(AsO_{2})_{2}	Acetate (acetic acid) Triarsenite (1,3,5,2,4,6-Trioxatriarsinane-2,4,6-triol)	
Copper(II) benzoate	Cu(C_{6}H_{5}CO_{2})_{2}	Benzoate (benzoic acid)	
Copper(II) arsenite (Scheele's Green)	CuHAsO_{3}	Arsenite (Arsenous acid)	
Copper(II) chromite	Cu_{2}Cr_{2}O_{5}	Chromite (chromic acid)	
Copper(II) gluconate	C_{12}H_{22}CuO_{14}	Gluconate (gluconic acid)	
Copper(II) peroxide	CuO_{2}	Peroxide (hydrogen peroxide)	
Copper(II) usnate	C_{18}H_{14}CuO_{7}	Usnate (usnic acid)	
Copper(II) oxychloride	Cu_{2}(OH)_{3}Cl	Hydroxide and chloride	
Copper(II) naproxen	C_{28}H_{26}CuO_{6}	naproxen	
Copper(II) ibuprofenate	C_{52}H_{68}Cu_{2}O_{8}	Ibuprofenate (ibuprofen)	

== Copper(I, II) salts ==
Name	Chemical Formula	Anion	Image
copper(I,II) sulfite dihydrate (Chevreul's salt)	Cu_{3}(SO_{3})_{2}·2H_{2}O	Sulfite (Sulfurous acid)	სპილენძ (I, II) სულფიტი დიჰიდრატი

== See also ==
- List of organic salts
- List of inorganic compounds
