= List of organic salts =

Numerous economically or medically significant organic compounds are salts.

These include:

- Formates
- Acetamides
- Acetates
- Butyrates
- Benzoates
- Carboxylates
- Alkoxides
- Phenolates
- Oxalates
- Malonates
- Tartrates
- Malates
- Citrates
- Gluconates
- Maleates
- Sorbates
- Stearates
- Lactates
- Glycerates
- Urates
- Diazonium salts
- Iminium salts
- Phosphinates
- Organophosphates
- Mesylates
- Bechgaard salts
- Picolinates
- Salts of cocaine
- Salts of morphine
- Monosodium glutamate
- Trolamine salicylate
- Triphenylmethyl hexafluorophosphate
- Choline chloride
- Copper ibuprofenate
- Homatropine methylbromide
- Mellite
- Tetrapropylammonium perruthenate
- Collidinium p-toluenesulfonate
- Pyridinium chloride
- Tetrasodium EDTA
- Lithium diisopropylamide
- Lithium bis(trimethylsilyl)amide
- Potassium trispyrazolylborate

== See also ==
- List of copper salts
- List of inorganic compounds
