= Plating =

Surface covering of metal on a conductor

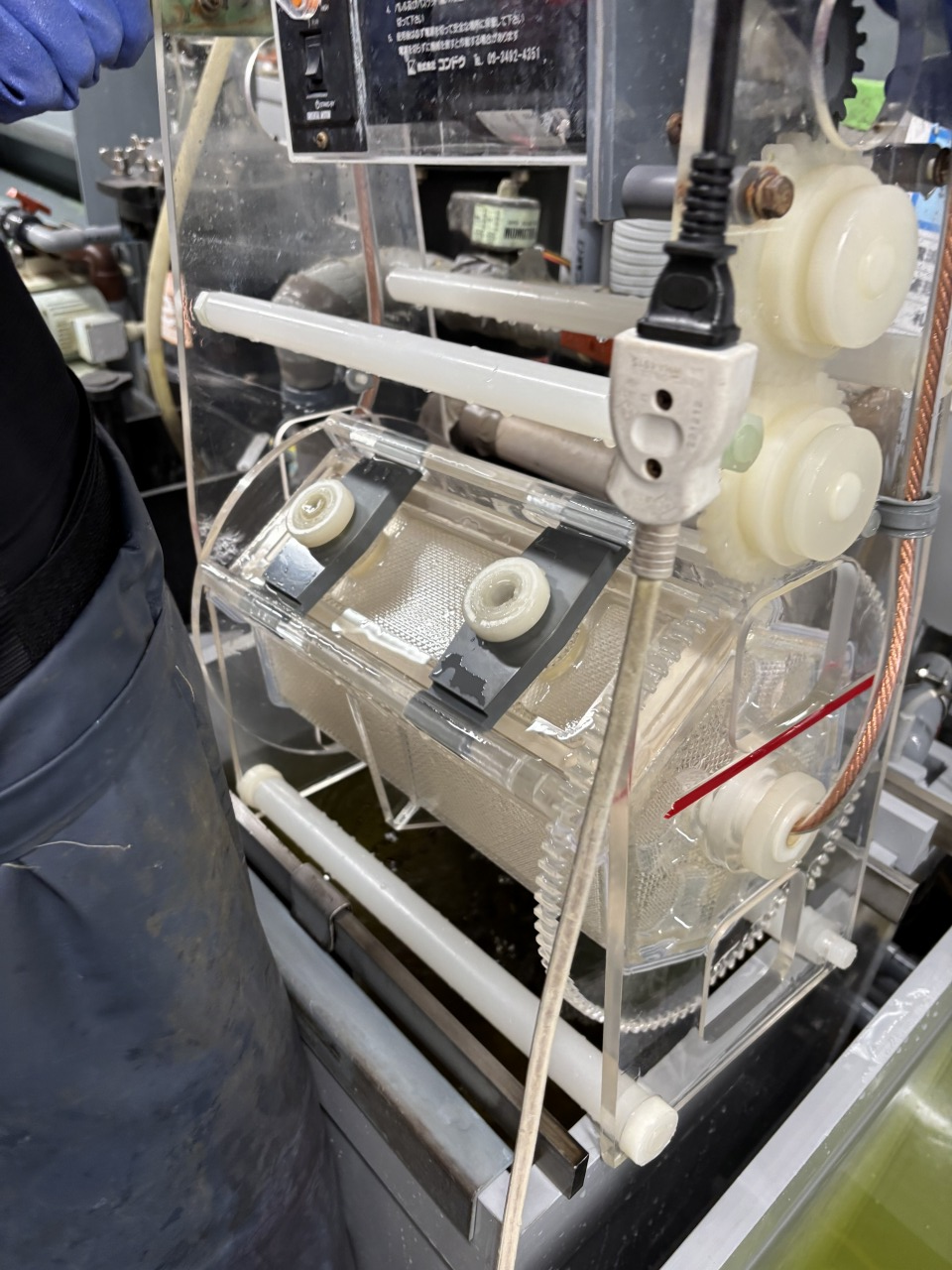
Barrel plating method(Japan)

Plating is a finishing process in which a metal is deposited on a surface. Plating has been done for hundreds of years; it is also critical for modern technology. Plating is used to decorate objects, for corrosion inhibition, to improve solderability, to harden, to improve wearability, to reduce friction, to improve paint adhesion, to alter conductivity, to improve IR reflectivity, for radiation shielding, and for other purposes. Jewelry typically uses plating to give a silver or gold finish.

Thin-film deposition has plated objects as small as an atom, therefore plating finds uses in nanotechnology.

There are several plating methods, and many variations. In one method, a solid surface is covered with a metal sheet, and then heat and pressure are applied to fuse them (a version of this is Sheffield plate). Other plating techniques include electroplating, vapor deposition under vacuum and sputter deposition. Recently, plating often refers to using liquids. Metallizing refers to coating metal on non-metallic objects.

== Electroplating ==
In electroplating, an ionic metal is supplied with electrons to form a non-ionic coating on a substrate. A common system involves a chemical solution with the ionic form of the metal, an anode (positively charged) which may consist of the metal being plated (a soluble anode) or an insoluble anode (usually carbon, platinum, titanium, lead, or steel), and finally, a cathode (negatively charged) where electrons are supplied to produce a film of non-ionic metal.

== Electroless deposition ==
Electroless deposition, also known as chemical or auto-catalytic plating, is a non-galvanic plating method that involves several simultaneous reactions in an aqueous solution, which occur without the use of external electrical power. The reaction is accomplished when hydrogen is released by a reducing agent, normally sodium hypophosphite (Note: the hydrogen leaves as a hydride ion) or thiourea, and oxidized, thus producing a negative charge on the surface of the part. The most common electroless deposition method is electroless nickel plating, although silver, gold and copper layers can also be applied in this manner, as in the technique of angel gilding.

== Specific cases ==
=== Gold plating ===
Gold plating is a method of depositing a thin layer of gold on the surface of glass or metal, most often copper or silver.

Gold plating is often used in electronics, to provide a corrosion-resistant electrically conductive layer on copper, typically in electrical connectors and printed circuit boards. With direct gold-on-copper plating, the copper atoms have the tendency to diffuse through the gold layer, causing tarnishing of its surface and formation of an oxide/sulfide layer. Therefore, a layer of a suitable barrier metal, usually nickel, has to be deposited on the copper substrate, forming a copper-nickel-gold sandwich.

Metals and glass may also be coated with gold for ornamental purposes, using a number of different processes usually referred to as gilding.

Sapphires, plastics, and carbon fiber are some other materials that are able to be plated using advance plating techniques. The substrates that can be used are almost limitless.

=== Silver plating ===
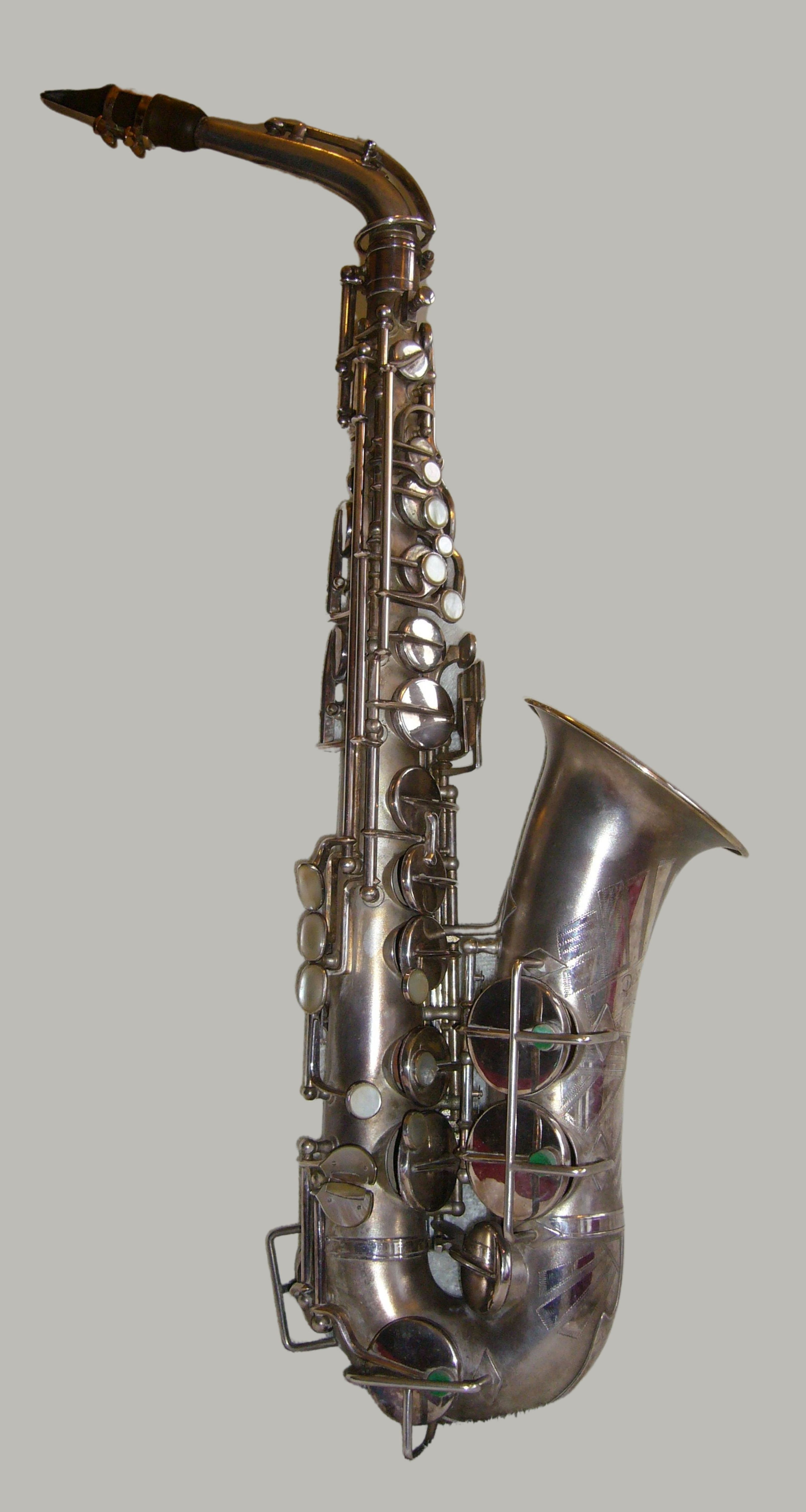
A silver-plated alto saxophone

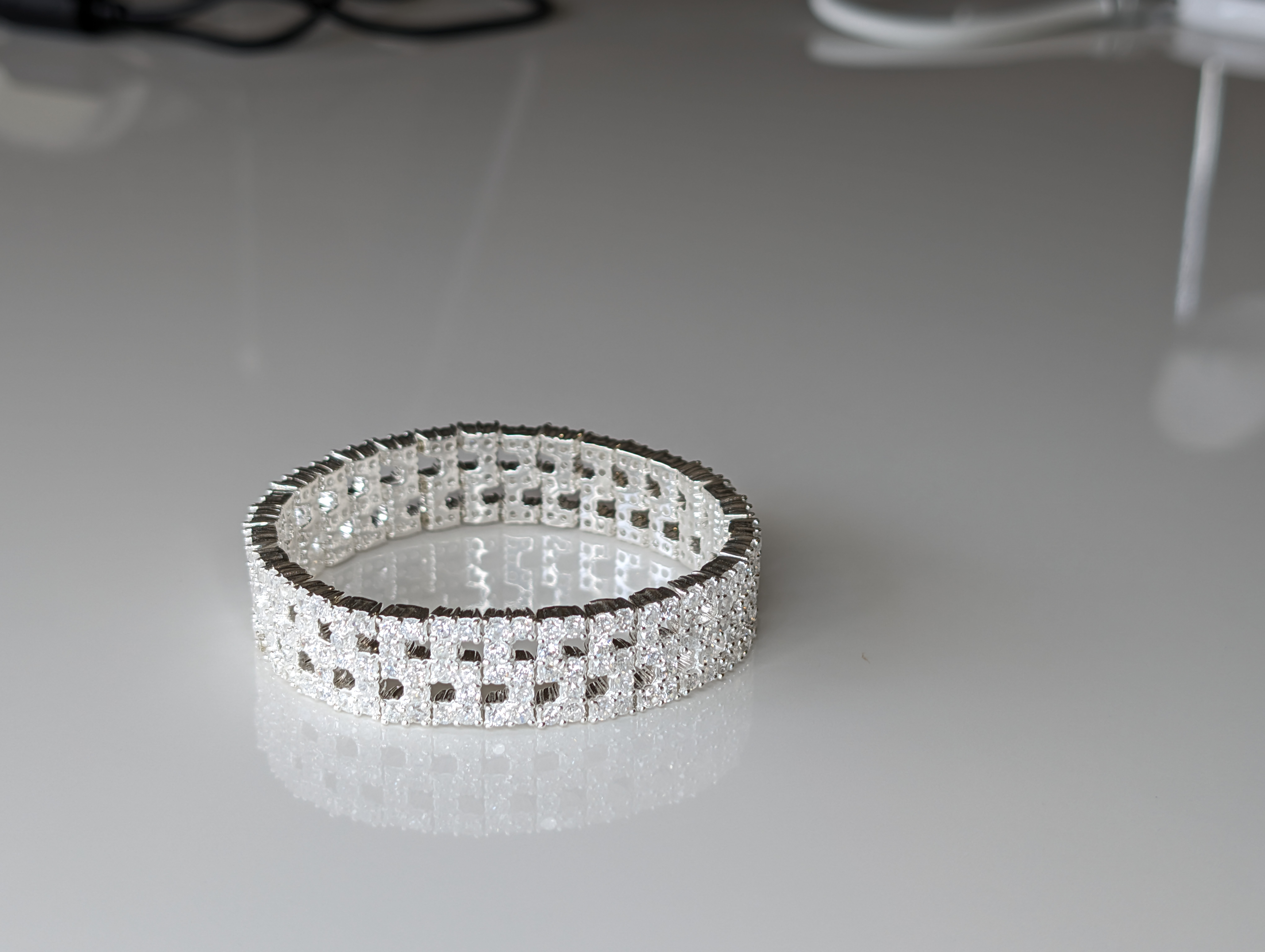
This bracelet has zircon gemstones. The metal is zinc alloy base with silver coating.

Silver plating has been used since the 18th century to provide cheaper versions of household items that would otherwise be made of solid silver, including cutlery, vessels of various kinds, and candlesticks. In the UK the assay offices, and silver dealers and collectors, use the term "silver plate" for items made from solid silver, derived long before silver plating was invented from the Spanish word for silver "plata", seizures of silver from Spanish ships carrying silver from America being a large source of silver at the time. This can cause confusion when talking about silver items; plate or plated. In the UK it is illegal to describe silver-plated items as "silver". It is not illegal to describe silver-plated items as "silver plate", although this is ungrammatical.

The earliest form of silver plating was Sheffield Plate, where thin sheets of silver are fused to a layer or core of base metal, but in the 19th century new methods of production (including electroplating) were introduced. Britannia metal is an alloy of tin, antimony and copper developed as a base metal for plating with silver.

Another method that can be used to apply a thin layer of silver to objects such as glass, is to place Tollens' reagent in a glass, add glucose/dextrose, and shake the bottle to promote the reaction.

AgNO_{3} + KOH → AgOH + KNO_{3}
AgOH + 2 NH_{3} → [Ag(NH_{3})_{2}]^{+} + [OH]^{−} (Note: see Tollens' reagent)
[Ag(NH_{3})_{2}]^{+} + [OH]^{−} + aldehyde (usually glucose/dextrose) → Ag + 2 NH_{3} + H_{2}O

For applications in electronics, silver is sometimes used for plating copper, as its electrical resistance is lower (see Resistivity of various materials); more so at higher frequencies due to the skin effect. Variable capacitors are considered of the highest quality when they have silver-plated plates. Similarly, silver-plated, or even solid silver cables, are prized in audiophile applications; however some experts consider that in practice the plating is often poorly implemented, making the result inferior to similarly priced copper cables.

Care should be used for parts exposed to high humidity environments because in such environments, when the silver layer is porous or contains cracks, the underlying copper undergoes rapid galvanic corrosion, flaking off the plating and exposing the copper itself; a process known as red plague. Silver plated copper maintained in a moisture-free environment will not undergo this type of corrosion.

=== Copper plating ===
Copper plating is the process of electrolytically forming a layer of copper on the surface of an item. It is commonly used as an even cheaper alternative to silver plating as it is much cheaper than silver.

=== Rhodium plating ===
Rhodium plating is occasionally used on white gold, silver or copper and its alloys. A barrier layer of nickel is usually deposited on silver first, though in this case it is not to prevent migration of silver through rhodium, but to prevent contamination of the rhodium bath with silver and copper, which slightly dissolve in the sulfuric acid usually present in the bath composition.

=== Chrome plating ===
Chrome plating is a finishing treatment using the electrolytic deposition of chromium. The most common form of chrome plating is the thin, decorative bright chrome, which is typically a 10-μm layer over an underlying nickel plate. When plating on iron or steel, an underlying plating of copper allows the nickel to adhere. The pores (tiny holes) in the nickel and chromium layers work to alleviate stress caused by thermal expansion mismatch but also hurt the corrosion resistance of the coating. Corrosion resistance relies on what is called the passivation layer, which is determined by the chemical composition and processing, and is damaged by cracks and pores. In a special case, micropores can help distribute the electrochemical potential that accelerates galvanic corrosion between the layers of nickel and chromium. Depending on the application, coatings of different thicknesses will require different balances of the aforementioned properties. Thin, bright chrome imparts a mirror-like finish to items such as metal furniture frames and automotive trim. Thicker deposits, up to 1000 μm, are called hard chrome and are used in industrial equipment to reduce friction and wear.

The traditional solution used for industrial hard chrome plating is made up of about 250 g/L of CrO_{3} and about 2.5 g/L of SO_{4}^{−}. In solution, the chrome exists as chromic acid, known as hexavalent chromium. A high current is used, in part to stabilize a thin layer of chromium(+2) at the surface of the plated work. Acid chrome has poor throwing power, fine details or holes are further away and receive less current resulting in poor plating.

=== Zinc plating ===
Zinc coatings prevent oxidation of the protected metal by forming a barrier and by acting as a sacrificial anode if this barrier is damaged. Zinc oxide is a fine white dust that (in contrast to iron oxide) does not cause a breakdown of the substrate's surface integrity as it is formed. Indeed, the zinc oxide, if undisturbed, can act as a barrier to further oxidation, in a way similar to the protection afforded to aluminum and stainless steels by their oxide layers. The majority of hardware parts are zinc-plated, rather than cadmium-plated.

=== Zinc-nickel plating ===
Zinc-nickel plating is one of the best corrosion resistant finishes available offering over 5 times the protection of conventional zinc plating and up to 1,500 hours of neutral salt spray test performance. This plating is a combination of a high-nickel zinc-nickel alloy (10–15% nickel) and some variation of chromate. The most common mixed chromates include hexavalent iridescent, trivalent or black trivalent chromate. Used to protect steel, cast iron, brass, copper, and other materials, this acidic plating is an environmentally safe option. Hexavalent chromate has been classified as a human carcinogen by the EPA and OSHA.

=== Tin plating ===
The tin-plating process is used extensively to protect both ferrous and nonferrous surfaces. Tin is a useful metal for the food processing industry since it is non-toxic, ductile and corrosion resistant. The excellent ductility of tin allows a tin coated base metal sheet to be formed into a variety of shapes without damage to the surface tin layer. It provides sacrificial protection for copper, nickel and other non-ferrous metals, but not for steel.

Tin is also widely used in the electronics industry because of its ability to protect the base metal from oxidation thus preserving its solderability. In electronic applications, 3% to 7% lead may be added to improve solderability and to prevent the growth of metallic "whiskers" in compression stressed deposits, which would otherwise cause electrical shorting. However, RoHS (Restriction of Hazardous Substances) regulations enacted beginning in 2006 require that no lead be added intentionally and that the maximum percentage not exceed 1%. Some exemptions have been issued to RoHS requirements in critical electronics applications due to failures which are known to have occurred as a result of tin whisker formation.

=== Alloy plating ===
In some cases, it is desirable to co-deposit two or more metals resulting in an electroplated alloy deposit. Depending on the alloy system, an electroplated alloy may be solid solution strengthened or precipitation hardened by heat treatment to improve the plating's physical and chemical properties. Nickel-Cobalt is a common electroplated alloy.

=== Composite plating ===
Metal matrix composite plating can be manufactured when a substrate is plated in a bath containing a suspension of ceramic particles. Careful selection of the size and composition of the particles can fine-tune the deposit for wear resistance, high temperature performance, or mechanical strength. Tungsten carbide, silicon carbide, chromium carbide, and aluminum oxide (alumina) are commonly used in composite electroplating.

=== Cadmium plating ===
Cadmium plating is under scrutiny because of the environmental toxicity of the cadmium metal. Cadmium plating is widely used in some applications in the aerospace, military, and aviation fields. However, it is being phased out due to its toxicity. Military and Aerospace components manufacturers, such as Amphenol Aerospace, have recently been exploring drop-in electroplating replacements for use with currently fielded equipment in order to support the phaseout of the dangerous finish.

Cadmium plating (or cad. plating) offers a long list of technical advantages such as excellent corrosion resistance even at relatively low thickness and in salt atmospheres, softness and malleability, freedom from sticky and/or bulky corrosion products, galvanic compatibility with aluminum, freedom from stick-slip thus allowing reliable torquing of plated threads, can be dyed to many colors and clear, has good lubricity and solderability, and works well either as a final finish or as a paint base.

If environmental concerns matter, in most aspects cadmium plating can be directly replaced with gold plating as it shares most of the material properties, but gold is more expensive and cannot serve as a paint base.

=== Nickel plating ===
Nickel is electroplated by using a Watts bath, an electrolytic cell having a nickel anode and electrolyte containing nickel sulfate, nickel chloride, and boric acid. Other nickel salts such as nickel ammonium sulfate are sometimes used instead of nickel sulfate.

=== Electroless nickel plating ===
Electroless nickel plating, also known as enickel and NiP, offers many advantages: uniform layer thickness over most complicated surfaces, direct plating of ferrous metals (steel), superior wear and corrosion resistance compared to electroplated nickel or chrome. Much of the chrome plating done in aerospace industry can be replaced with electroless nickel plating, again environmental costs, costs of hexavalent chromium waste disposal and notorious tendency of uneven current distribution favor electroless nickel plating.

Electroless nickel plating is self-catalyzing process, the resultant nickel layer is NiP compound, with 7–11% phosphorus content. Properties of the resultant layer hardness and wear resistance are greatly altered with bath composition and deposition temperature, which should be regulated with 1 °C precision, typically at 91 °C.

During bath circulation, any particles in it will become also nickel-plated; this effect is used to advantage in processes which deposit plating with particles like silicon carbide (SiC) or polytetrafluoroethylene (PTFE). While superior compared to many other plating processes, it is expensive because the process is complex. Moreover, the process is lengthy even for thin layers. When only corrosion resistance or surface treatment is of concern, very strict bath composition and temperature control is not required and the process is used for plating many tons in one bath at once.

Electroless nickel plating layers are known to provide extreme surface adhesion when plated properly. Electroless nickel plating is non-magnetic and amorphous. Electroless nickel plating layers are not easily solderable, nor do they seize with other metals or another electroless nickel-plated workpiece under pressure. This effect benefits electroless nickel-plated screws made out of malleable materials like titanium. Electrical resistance is higher compared to pure metal plating.

=== Aluminum plating ===
"Aluminum plating" can refer to either plating on aluminum or the plating of aluminum on other materials.

== See also ==
- Anodization
- Mechanical plating
- Organic solderability preservative plating
