= Edison–Lalande cell =

Type of electrochemical cell

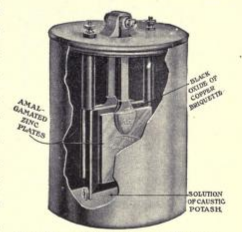
- Edison–Lalande cell

The Edison–Lalande cell was a type of alkaline primary battery developed by Thomas Edison from an earlier design by Felix Lalande and Georges Chaperon. It consisted of plates of copper oxide and zinc in a solution of potassium hydroxide. The cell voltage was low (about 0.75 volts) but the internal resistance was also low so these cells were capable of delivering large currents. The cell could be replenished with fresh zinc and copper oxide plates and KOH solution for reuse.

== History ==
=== Lalande–Chaperon cell ===
In 1880, the manufacturer De Branville and Company of 25 rue de la Montagne Sainte-Geneviève, Paris exploited the patent of Lalande and Chaperon to build copper oxide batteries. In 1887, the French submarine Gymnote (Q1) was built. The boat was originally fitted with 540 Lalande–Chaperon alkaline cells which used zinc and copper oxide electrodes with potassium hydroxide electrolyte, manufactured by Coumelin, Desmazures and Baillache.

=== Edison–Lalande cell ===
Edison improved on the Lalande–Chaperon cell by replacing powdered copper oxide with copper oxide briquettes.

=== Poerscke–Wedekind cell ===
Another modification to the Lalande-type cell was patented by Heinrich Poerscke and Gustav Wedekind in 1905, British patent GB190416751. In this cell, the copper oxide depolarizer was pasted on the inside of a cast iron pot. When the depolarizer was exhausted, the cell was dismantled and the liquid was poured out. The pot was then heated in air to re-oxidize the deposited copper to copper oxide. The Neotherm cell, by Siemens, was similar.

== Chemistry ==
The zinc anode dissolves (is oxidised) in the hydroxide solution to form zincate anions, consuming hydroxide ions in the process; electrons enter the external circuit:

Zn^{0} + 4 OH^{−} → [Zn(OH_{4})]^{2−} + 2 e^{−}

Half of the hydroxide ions are replenished by the hydration and reduction of the copper oxide cathode to copper metal by the electrons travelling in the external circuit:

CuO + H_{2}O + 2 e^{−} → Cu^{0} + 2 OH^{−}

The overall reaction is:

Zn^{0} + 4 OH^{−} + CuO + H_{2}O → [Zn(OH_{4})]^{2−} + Cu^{0} + 2 OH^{−}

== Applications ==
Applications for Lalande-type batteries included submarine power (see above), railway signalling, and powering Edison's electric fans and phonographs.
