= Copper benzoate =

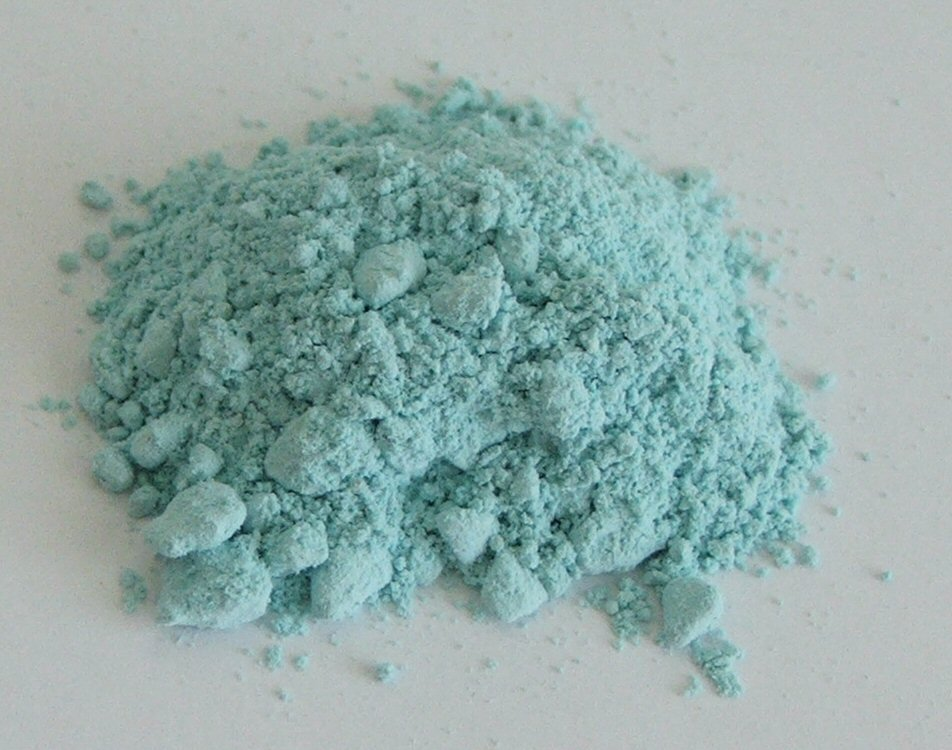

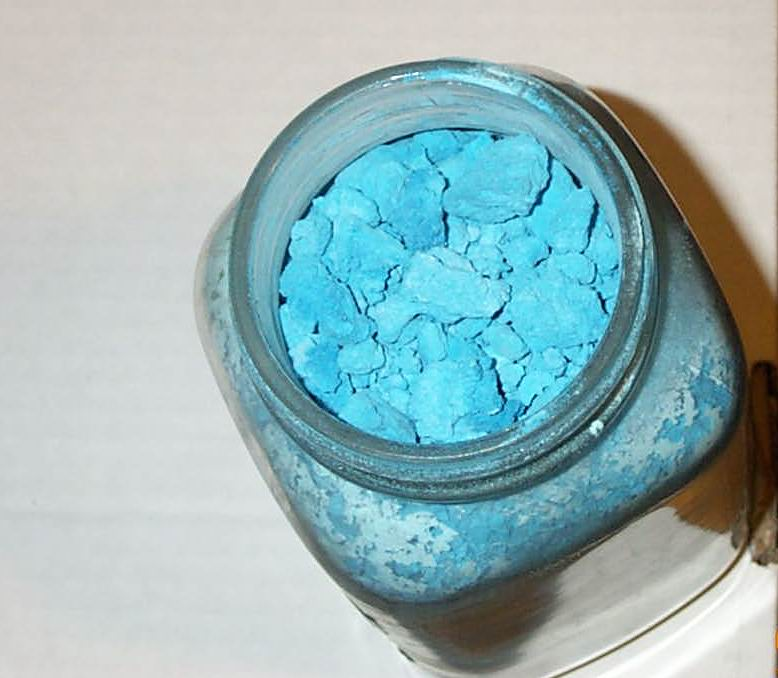

Names
- IUPAC name copper dibenzoate
- Other names cupric benzoate

Identifiers
CAS Number	533-01-7
3D model (JSmol)	Interactive image; Chinese lantern structure: Interactive image
ChemSpider	144339
ECHA InfoCard	100.007.776
PubChem CID	164650
UNII	1M9U62M4WK
CompTox Dashboard (EPA)	DTXSID20890501
- InChI: InChI=1S/2C7H6O2.Cu/c2*8-7(9)6-4-2-1-3-5-6;/h2*1-5H,(H,8,9);/q;;+2/p-2 Key: YEOCHZFPBYUXMC-UHFFFAOYSA-L; InChI=1/2C7H6O2.Cu/c2*8-7(9)6-4-2-1-3-5-6;/h2*1-5H,(H,8,9);/q;;+2/p-2 Key: YEOCHZFPBYUXMC-NUQVWONBAX
- SMILES: [Cu+2].[O-]C(=O)c1ccccc1.[O-]C(=O)c1ccccc1; Chinese lantern structure: c0ccccc0[C-](O[Cu+2]123)O[Cu+2](O[C-](O1)c0ccccc0)(O[C-](O2)c0ccccc0)O[C-](O3)c0ccccc0

Properties
Chemical formula	C_{14}H_{10}CuO_{4}; C_{14}H_{12}CuO_{5} (dihydrate)
Molar mass	305.77 g/mol; 323.795 g/mol (dihydrate)
Appearance	blue solid
Density	1.197 g/cm^{3}

Hazards
- GHS labelling
Pictograms	(GHS07: Exclamation mark)
Signal word	Warning
Hazard statements	H315, H319, H335
Precautionary statements	P261, P305+P351+P338
Flash point	111.4 °C (232.5 °F; 384.5 K)
- NIOSH (US health exposure limits)
PEL (Permissible)	TWA 1 mg/m^{3} (as Cu)
REL (Recommended)	TWA 1 mg/m^{3} (as Cu)
IDLH (Immediate danger)	TWA 100 mg/m^{3} (as Cu)

Related compounds
Other anions	Copper aspirinate; Copper salicylate
Other cations	Sodium benzoate; Potassium benzoate
Related compounds	Phenylcopper
- Except where otherwise noted, data are given for materials in their standard state (at 25 °C [77 °F], 100 kPa). verify (what is ?) Infobox references

Copper benzoate describes the chemical compound with the formula Cu(C_{6}H_{5}CO_{2})_{2}(H_{2}O)_{n}. They consist of coordination complexes derived from the cupric ion and the conjugate base of benzoic acid. Many derivatives are known with diverse ancillary ligands.

== Structure ==
Structure of one form of copper(II) benzoate.

Copper(II) benzoate exists in at least two structural forms, depending on the degree of hydration. Resembling copper(II) acetate, one form of copper benzoate adopts a "Chinese lantern" structure, wherein a pair of copper centers are linked by four bridging carboxylate ligands. Typically, one site on each copper center is occupied by water, which can be replaced by other ligands. A hydrated form is also known, wherein each Cu(II) centre is bound to four water ligands and a bidentate O, O-benzoate.

== Preparation ==
=== Trihydrate ===
Copper benzoate trihydrate can be made by combining aqueous solutions of sodium benzoate and copper sulfate, forming a pale blue precipitate:

4 Na(C_{6}H_{5}CO_{2}) + 2 CuSO_{4}·5H_{2}O → Cu_{2}(C_{6}H_{5}CO_{2})_{4}(H_{2}O)_{2} + 2 Na_{2}SO_{4} + 8 H_{2}O

=== Anhydrous forms ===
The α form of the anhydrous compound is prepared by vacuum desiccation of the trihydrate at 95 °C (203 °F) with phosphorus pentoxide. The β form is obtained by heating the monoethanol derivative in air at 90 °C (194 °F). The 𝛾 form is obtained by heating the monoethanol derivative in boiling carbon tetrachloride for a few hours. All are described as "blue-green crystalline powders."

== Uses ==
It has found some niche use as a combination fuel and source of copper ions for blue light production in fireworks. It is not on the list of chemicals approved in consumer fireworks in the US.

It is also used in two-part dental adhesives, in polyester resin compositions to increase thermal resistance and decrease gelation, and as a metal-based hydrogen sulfide scavenger in asphalt.

== Related compounds ==
=== Tetrakis[copper(I) benzoate] ===
A tetrakis[copper(I) benzoate] has been characterized.

=== Addition compounds ===
Copper(II) benzoate forms many addition compounds. Examples include copper(II) benzoate mono(benzoic acid) and the adducts with ethanol and urea.
