= Copper naproxen =

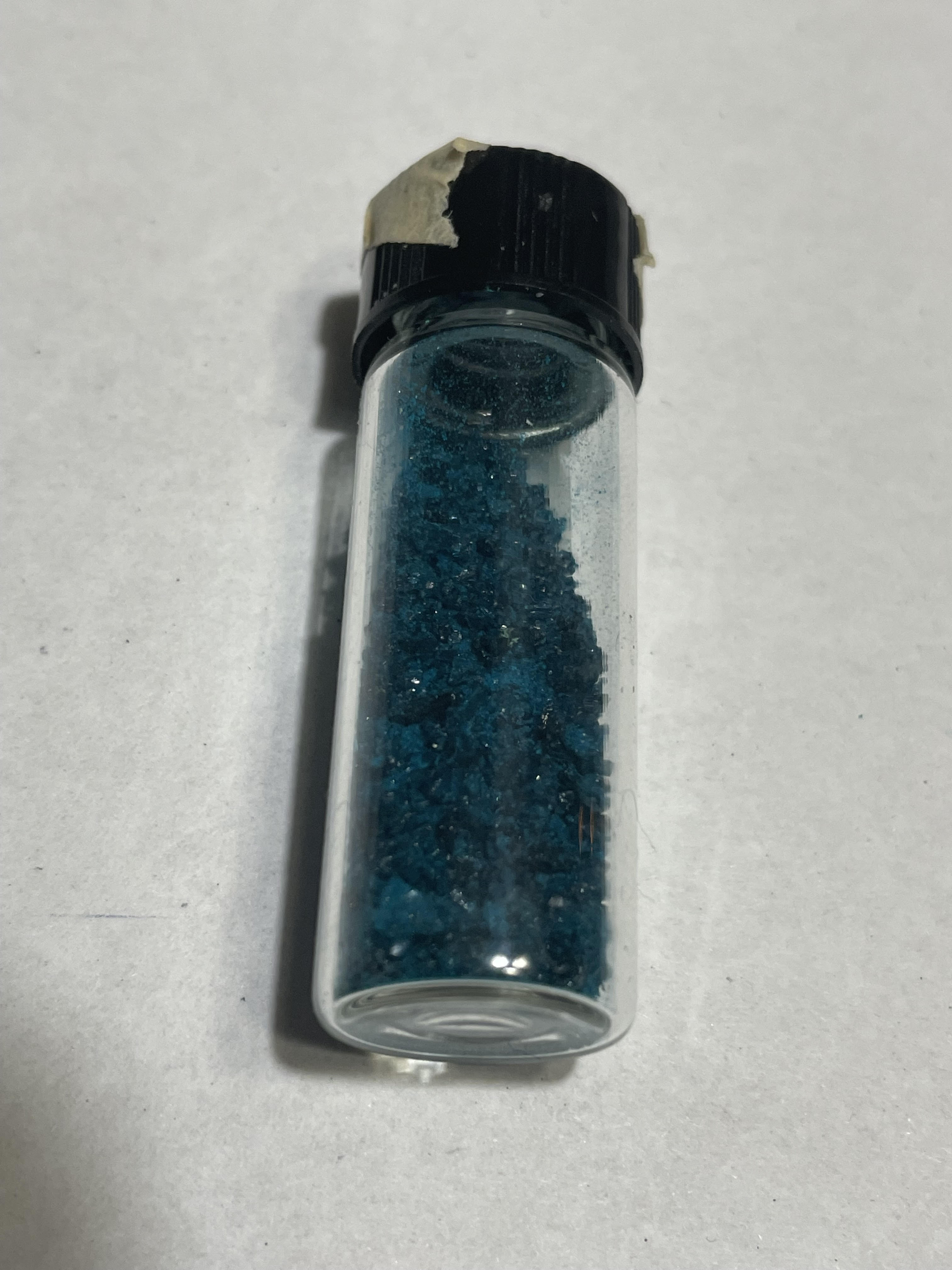
- Sample of copper naproxen in a glass vial

- Powdered Copper Naproxen Monohydrate

Names
- Other names Copper(II) 6-methoxy-a-methyl-2-naphthaleneacetate

Identifiers
3D model (JSmol)	Interactive image
- InChI: InChI=1S/2C14H14O3.Cu/c2*1-9(14(15)16)10-3-4-12-8-13(17-2)6-5-11(12)7-10;/h2*3-9H,1-2H3,(H,15,16);/q;;+2/p-2/t2*9-;/m00./s1 Key: GBARQYVMLWJLEP-NAWJVIAPSA-L
- SMILES: COc1cc2ccc(cc2cc1)[C@H](C)C(=O)[O-].COc1cc2ccc(cc2cc1)[C@H](C)C(=O)[O-].[Cu+2]

Properties
Chemical formula	C_{28}H_{26}CuO_{6}
Molar mass	522.056 g·mol^{−1}
Appearance	Green solid
Solubility	Soluble in methanol, 1,4-dioxane, DMSO, DMF

Related compounds
Related compounds	Copper aspirinate Copper ibuprofenate
- Except where otherwise noted, data are given for materials in their standard state (at 25 °C [77 °F], 100 kPa). Infobox references

Copper naproxen is a chemical complex of Cu^{2+} chelated with the anti-inflammatory drug naproxen. Copper complexes of NSAIDs like naproxen have been shown to have greater anti-inflammatory properties than the base drug.

Copper naproxen can be found as a monohydrate, and it can form complexes with other organic molecules such as nicotinyl alcohol, 3-methylpyridine, and caffeine.

== Preparation ==
Copper naproxen is prepared by reacting sodium naproxen with a copper(II) salt such as copper(II) sulfate.

2 C_{14}H_{13}NaO_{3} + CuSO_{4} → C_{28}H_{26}CuO_{6} + Na_{2}SO_{4}
