= Rodolfo Disner Clavería =

Mexican artist (1931–2021)

Rodolfo Disner Clavería (1931 – April 9, 2021) was a Mexican artist who was recognized with the Chiapas Prize in Arts. A ceramist, he was a representative of the Chiapas visual arts, and was called "the golden alchemist" for his creativity in plastic arts.

== Personal life ==
Disner Clavería was born in Huixtla, Chiapas; however, he lived for a long time near a brick factory in Tonalá where he began to make clay figures, beginning his appreciation of plastic arts. Among his children is the writer and cultural promoter Damaris Disner, who runs the Rodolfo Disner Gallery in his honor in the city of Tuxtla Gutiérrez. He moved to Mexico City for a few years, where he studied at the Academy of San Carlos from 1956 to 1960, the same school that housed great Mexican muralists such as David Alfaro Siqueiros and Diego Rivera and where learned history and art.

== Creative career ==
Disner Clavería made ceramic murals, among them those of the Library of the Jaime Sabines Cultural Center, which alludes to the origins of humanity. It took him a year to make it together with 12 artisans. The work is made up of 12,200 partitions of 15 by 15 each. The technique consists of drawing directly on the clay boards and firing them; the effects are achieved by applying a chemical coloring base, as well as copper oxide reductions. Another of his murals can be found on Campus IX of the Autonomous University of Chiapas, in Tonalá. Writers from Chiapas have reflected their admiration for Disner's work, such as Iris Aggeler (speaking on the Jaime Sabines mural): "Disner's woman is smiling, she greets us head-on, looks at us and welcomes us with its open arms, between dolphins and other sea beings. It is an allegory that pays homage to the sea as a source of life, to the generous and fertile spirit of water."

The themes of his work include the sea, religion, and daily life. It has numerous national and international exhibitions, individual and collective. In 2000, the Chiapas State Council for Cultures and Arts held a retrospective of his artistic work and a tribute to his work in the plastic arts. He has also shown his works from 1968 to 1970 in Mexico City and the state of Hidalgo, in 1970 at the School of Plastic Arts in Oaxaca, in 1984 at the Goethe Institute, in 1986 at the "Jesús Reyes Heroles" House of Culture, and in 1988 in Houston, San Francisco, and San Diego.

== Prizes ==
Disner was recognized with the Chiapas Arts Prize in 2000.
