= Damaris Disner =

Mexican playwright

Damaris Disner Lara (born 3 October 1975) is a playwright who won the Second National Literature Contest for Boys and Girls, in the Dramaturgy category (2021). She is also a cultural manager, cultural journalist, editor and art teacher.

== Personal life ==
Disner is the youngest daughter of the plastic artist and ceramic muralist Rodolfo Disner Clavería. She was born in Mexico City in 1975. She started writing around the age of 14. She lived her infancy in Tonalá, a coastal place where she studied primary and secondary school at the La Rosa religious school, and high school at the Tonalá High School. She currently lives and works in the capital of Chiapas: Tuxtla Gutiérrez.

== Studies ==
She has a degree in Communication Sciences from the Autonomous University of Chiapas (UNACH). She was a member of the literary creation workshop of the Yolanda Gómez Fuentes Children's Coexistence and Family Recreation Center, and of the Poetics and Narrative Seminar of the General Society of Writers of Mexico (SOGEM). In 2005 she studied dramaturgy with Bertha Hiriart, and during 2004 with Enrique Polo Keratry.

== Creative career ==
Her literary work includes cultural articles in newspapers, state and national magazines. She also writes theater plays, mini fiction, haikus and other forms of poetry. Disner assumes herself as curious by vocation and is also a lover of the feline spirit. She works with children's literature, theatre, mini fictions (also known as flash fiction), cultural press, and according to her words, she seeks to break through monotony and disenchantment with her words. She affirms that in the works for children, she seeks to unravel the fears of childhood, to confront them from the perspective of the adult she learns to be.

== Articles ==
She has published in various Mexican cultural newspapers and magazines. She was editor of the Culture section of El Heraldo de Chiapas, from 2007 to 2010, where she founded and coordinated the children's supplement Pingoletras. She edited the magazine Tú las Traes with the support of Alas y Raíces a los Niños del Coneculta Chiapas.

== Books and plays ==
She has participated in six anthologies, between those: Mujeres en la Minificción Mexicana. (Women in Mexican Minifiction).

Cáscara de Mar (Sea Shell) is a traditional memory play that proposes to find, in a jumble of letters, the two whose drawings by Juventino Sánchez, and haikus by Disner coincide. So we find a playful and literary element: one of the cards is a drawing and the other, which we must find to match it, is a haiku, a short three-line poem.

In 2017, she presented the play Leimotiv, produced by Confines Teatro.

Her first playwriting book is entitled La noche que habitamos (The night we inhabit), 2007. Another of her works is La Siguiente Esquina (The next corner), 2015. Among the plays of her authorship are Telemilio, 2005, and Pitukali, 2006.

== Cultural manager ==
Since 2 March 2013, she created and has directed the Rodolfo Disner Gallery, whose name is in honor of her father, a renowned visual artist from Chiapas. It is located in the city of Tuxtla Gutiérrez, the capital of Chiapas. In this space, they establish a link between local children and the world of creation, with activities related to culture, art, literature, music, dance, and theater.

== Awards ==
Disner won the Second National Literature Contest for Boys and Girls, in the Dramaturgy category (2021). She also received a scholarship from the State Fund for Culture and the Arts (FECA) in 2005 and from the Program to Encourage Creation and Artistic Development (PECDA) in dramaturgy, in 2006.
