= Copper(II) chlorate =

Names
- IUPAC name Copper(2+) chlorate hydrate (1:2:4)
- Other names Copper(II) chlorate; Cupric chlorate

Identifiers
CAS Number	14721-21-2; hexahydrate: 13478-36-9
3D model (JSmol)	Interactive image
ChemSpider	2340508
ECHA InfoCard	100.035.228
EC Number	238-767-0
PubChem CID	3014850 anhydrous; 3083246 tetrahydrate
UNII	242533NAM2; hexahydrate: TVV0TW380J
UN number	2721
CompTox Dashboard (EPA)	DTXSID20163621
- InChI: InChI=1S/2ClHO3.Cu.4H2O/c2*2-1(3)4;;;;;/h2*(H,2,3,4);;4*1H2/q;;+2;;;;/p-2 Key: VPXMBRBPUORXKO-UHFFFAOYSA-L; InChI=1S/2ClHO3.Cu/c2*2-1(3)4;/h2*(H,2,3,4);/q;;+2/p-2 Key: IJCCOEGCVILSMZ-UHFFFAOYSA-L
- SMILES: O.O.O.O.[O-]Cl(=O)=O.[O-]Cl(=O)=O.[Cu+2]

Properties
Chemical formula	Cu(ClO_{3})_{2}•4H_{2}O
Molar mass	302.509
Appearance	Light blue
Density	2.26 g cm^{−3}
Melting point	73 °C (anhydrous); 65 °C (hexahydrate) (decomposition)
Solubility in water	highly water-soluble tetrahydrate 54.59 g/100 mL (-31 °C); 57.12 g/100 mL (-21 °C); 58.51 g/100 mL (0.8 °C); 62.17 g/100 mL (18 °C); 66.17 g/100 mL (45 °C); 69.42 g/100 mL (59.6 °C); 76.9 g/100 mL (71 °C) hexahydrate 141 g/100 mL (0 °C); 164.4 g/100 mL (18 °C); 195.6 g/100 mL (45 °C); 332 g/100 mL (70 °C)
Solubility	soluble in acetone and ethanol (hexahydrate)

Structure
Crystal structure	Orthorhombic
Space group	Pcab
Point group	mmm
Lattice constant	a = 12.924 Å, b = 9.502 Å, c = 7.233 Å
Lattice volume (V)	880.4 Å^{3}
Formula units (Z)	4
Coordination geometry	distorted octahedral

Hazards
- Occupational safety and health (OHS/OSH)
Main hazards	oxidiser
- Except where otherwise noted, data are given for materials in their standard state (at 25 °C [77 °F], 100 kPa). Infobox references

Copper(II) chlorate is a chemical compound of the transition metal copper and the chlorate anion with basic formula Cu(ClO_{3})_{2}. Copper chlorate is an oxidiser. It commonly forms the tetrahydrate, Cu(ClO_{3})_{2}·4H_{2}O.

== Properties ==
In 1902, A. Meusser investigated solubility of copper chlorate and found that it melted and started decomposing above 73 °C, giving off chlorine.

Copper chlorate decomposes when heated, giving off a yellow gas, which contains chlorine, oxygen and chlorine dioxide. A green solid is left that is a basic copper salt.

2 Cu(ClO_{3})_{2} → 2 CuO + Cl_{2} + 3 O_{2} + 2 ClO_{2}

Sulfur is highly reactive with copper chlorate, and it is important not to cross contaminate these chemicals, for example in pyrotechnic making.

== Structure ==
Copper(II) chlorate commonly crystallizes as a tetrahydrate, though a hexahydrate is also known. Tetraaquacopper(II) chlorate, Cu(ClO_{3})_{2}·4H_{2}O, has an orthorhombic crystal structure. Each copper atom is octahedrally coordinated, surrounded by four oxygen atoms of water, and two oxygen atoms from chlorate groups, which are opposite each other. Water is closer to the copper than chlorate, 1.944 Å compared to 2.396 Å, exhibiting the Jahn-Teller effect. The chlorate groups take the shape of a distorted tetrahedron. At 298 K (25 °C), the chlorine-oxygen distances in each chlorate ion are 1.498, 1.488 and 1.468 Å, with the longest being the oxygen next to copper. The ∠O-Cu-O (angle subtended at copper by oxygen atoms) is 105.2°, 108.3°, and 106.8°. At lower temperatures (233 K, −40 °C), the water molecules and copper-chlorate distance shrink.

== Production ==
Copper chlorate can be made by combining a hot one molar solution of copper sulfate, with barium chlorate, which results in the precipitation of barium sulfate. When the solution is filtered, cooled and evaporated under a vacuum blue crystals form.

CuSO_{4} + Ba(ClO_{3})_{2} → Cu(ClO_{3})_{2} + BaSO_{4}(s)

== Use ==
François-Marie Chertier used tetraamminecopper(II) chlorate to colour flames blue in 1843. This material was abbreviated TACC with formula Cu(NH_{3})_{4}(ClO_{3})_{2}. TACC explodes on impact.

The substance became known as Chertier's copper for use in blue coloured pyrotechnics. However its deliquescence causes a problem. Mixtures with other metal salts can yield violet or lilac colours too.

It has also been used to colour copper brown.
