= Copper(II) trifluoroacetate =

Names
- IUPAC name copper;2,2,2-trifluoroacetate

Identifiers
CAS Number	anhydrous: 16712-25-7; hydrate: 123333-88-0
3D model (JSmol)	anhydrous: Interactive image; hydrate: Interactive image
ChemSpider	anhydrous: 10019640
EC Number	anhydrous: 626-936-5; hydrate: 626-936-5
PubChem CID	anhydrous: 11845166; hydrate: 71311159
CompTox Dashboard (EPA)	anhydrous: DTXSID10714388
- InChI: anhydrous: InChI=1S/2C2HF3O2.Cu/c2*3-2(4,5)1(6)7;/h2*(H,6,7);/q;;+2/p-2 Key: JIDMEYQIXXJQCC-UHFFFAOYSA-L; hydrate: InChI=1S/2C2HF3O2.Cu.H2O/c2*3-2(4,5)1(6)7;;/h2*(H,6,7);;1H2 Key: UXLSNKPEIUIWAD-UHFFFAOYSA-N
- SMILES: anhydrous: C(=O)(C(F)(F)F)[O-].C(=O)(C(F)(F)F)[O-].[Cu+2]; hydrate: C(=O)(C(F)(F)F)O.C(=O)(C(F)(F)F)O.O.[Cu]

Properties
Chemical formula	(CF_{3}COO)_{2}Cu
Molar mass	289.576 g·mol^{−1}
Appearance	blue wet crystals (anhydrous); light blue crystals (tetrahydrate); blue crystals (diacetonitrile)
Solubility in water	soluble

Hazards
- GHS labelling
Pictograms	(GHS07: Exclamation mark)
Signal word	Warning
Hazard statements	H315, H319
Precautionary statements	P264, P280, P302+P352, P305+P351+P338, P321, P332+P313, P337+P313, P337+P317, P362+P364
NFPA 704 (fire diamond)	2 1 0
- NIOSH (US health exposure limits)
REL (Recommended)	1 mg/m^{3} (TWA, as Copper)
- Except where otherwise noted, data are given for materials in their standard state (at 25 °C [77 °F], 100 kPa). Infobox references

Copper(II) trifluoroacetate is the trifluoroacetate of divalent copper with the chemical formula Cu(CF_{3}COO)_{2}.

== Properties ==
It exists as the anhydride, hydrate and adducts of other solvents. The hydrate begins to lose two waters of crystallisation at 108 °C (226 °F), and loses all crystal water at 173 °C (343 °F) to form the anhydrous form. This begins to decompose at 220 °C (428 °F).

== Preparation ==
Copper trifluoroacetate can be obtained by reacting trifluoroacetic acid with copper oxide, copper hydroxide or basic copper carbonate. Acetone can replace the water molecules in copper trifluoroacetate hydrate, and under reduced pressure conditions, the acetone can be removed to obtain anhydrous material.

== Use ==
Copper trifluoroacetate finds some use as a reagent in organic chemistry. For example, it mediates the C–H bond arylation of arenes with arylboronic acids and is used in the arylation of indoles with triphenylbismuth bis-trifluoroacetate. It is also a catalyst for the aerobic oxidation of ethers.

== Adducts ==
Copper trifluoroacetate forms adducts with a variety of Lewis bases, such as ammonia, water, dioxane, and quinoline. The Lewis bases bind to the axial positions.
