= Copper oxide =

Copper oxide may refer to several binary compounds composed of the elements copper and oxygen. Two oxides are well known, Cu_{2}O and CuO, corresponding to the minerals cuprite and tenorite, respectively. Paramelaconite (Cu_{4}O_{3}) is less well characterized.

Copper oxide may refer to:

- Copper(I) oxide (cuprous oxide, Cu_{2}O)
- Copper(II) oxide (cupric oxide, CuO)
- Copper peroxide (CuO_{2}), a hypothetical compound
- Paramelaconite (copper(I,II) oxide, Cu_{4}O_{3})
- Copper(III) oxide (Cu_{2}O_{3}) does not exist although Cu(III) is a component of cuprate superconductors
- Copper(IV) oxide (CuO_{2}) has been proposed to exist in the gas phase
