= Mechanical plating =

Mechanical plating, also known as peen plating, mechanical deposition, or impact plating, is a plating process that imparts the coating by cold welding fine metal particles to a workpiece. Mechanical galvanization is the same process, but applies to coatings that are thicker than 0.001 in (0.025 mm). It is commonly used to overcome hydrogen embrittlement problems. Commonly plated workpieces include nails, screws, nuts, washers, stampings, springs, clips, and sintered iron components.

The process involves tumbling the workpieces with a mixture of water, metal powder, media, and additives. Common coating materials are zinc, cadmium, tin, copper, and aluminium.

Invented by the Tainton Company in the 1950s, it was further developed by the 3M company.

== Process ==
The process begins with a descaling and removing soil from the workpiece. This can be done in the tumbler or in a separate cleaning system. After cleaning, the parts are prepared by combining them with water, medium, and a surface conditioner. The surface conditioner lightly coats the workpiece in copper, while the medium removes any residual mill scale or oxides. Finally, accelerators, promoters and metal powder are added to the mix. The accelerators and promoters provide the proper chemical environment for the plating to occur, such as the maintenance of a pH level of 1 to 2 to prevent oxidation and promote adhesion. The medium that is already in the mixture cold welds the metal powder to the workpiece through impacts that are induced by the tumbling action of the tumbler. At this point the surface finish is typically matte to a semi-bright finish, however the finish can be improved with a water polish. The time required for the above process is approximately 50 minutes.

For some thinly coated workpieces a chromate passivation is necessary. Finally, the workpiece, whether passivated or not, is dried.

The medium material is usually soda lime glass or a ceramic. It is usually spherical in form, but angular shapes are also used. For plating, medium usage is usually 1 part medium for every workpiece, but for galvanization the ratio is 2:1. However, various sized media are used in each batch with a typical batch consisting of 50% 4–5 in (100–130 mm) sized beads, 25% 2–2.5 in (51–64 mm) sized beads, and 25% 1–1.25 in (25–32 mm) sized beads. The smaller media are omitted when the workpiece has a cavity that the medium can get caught in, such as a fastener's recessed head. Note that the medium is reused many times.

This process works better if the workpieces' surface finish is slightly rough.

=== Equipment ===
The most important piece of equipment in the process is the tumbler. It is constructed of steel or stainless steel and lined with an acid and abrasion resistant material, such as neoprene, polypropylene, and polybutylene. The barrel sizes range from 0.04–1.13 m^{3} (1.4–39.9 cu ft), however the working volume is only 25 to 35% of the total volume. For most plating applications the tumbler is rotated at 60 RPM, however it can vary. If the speed is too fast then lumpy deposits will form on the workpieces, but if the speed is too slow then the metal powder will not deposit onto the workpiece.

The separator separates the coated workpieces from the medium after coating. It can be as simple as a screen with water nozzles or as complicated as a vibratory system with magnetic separators. A medium handling machine then takes the separated medium and transports it to a storage tank for reuse.

The separated workpieces are then taken to a dryer to remove any moisture. Usually centrifugal dryers are used, however oven are used for larger parts or loads.

== Advantages and disadvantages ==
Corrosion protection results for various thickness and passivations of zinc mechanical plating, based on ASTM B117 test conditions

The greatest advantage of the process is its ability to overcome hydrogen embrittlement problems, which is important for workpieces that have a hardness greater than HRC 40. Note that there still is some embrittlement of the workpiece. While this process does not cause problems with hydrogen embrittlement, and electroplating does, it still offers equivalent corrosion protection. There is a great cost savings in using mechanical plating over electroplating on hardened workpieces, because the electroplating processes requires a pre- and post-plating operation to overcome hydrogen embrittlement problems. Moreover, because mechanical plating occurs at room temperature there is no tempering of hardened workpieces.

Another advantage is that mechanical plating evenly coats all surfaces and features, unlike electroplating which has issues plating recesses. Mechanical plating can evenly coat up to 75 μm thick. For thicker plating mechanical plating is especially cost advantageous versus electroplating, because the cycle time does not increase much for the thicker plating, unlike electroplating.

One of the disadvantages is the processes size limitations. Workpieces heavier than 1 lb (0.45 kg) can be damaged by the process, while flat lightweight workpieces tend to stick together so they are not properly plated.
