= Copper(I) nitrate =

Names
- IUPAC name copper(1+) nitrate
- Other names cuprous nitrate

Identifiers
CAS Number	3251-29-4
3D model (JSmol)	Interactive image
ChemSpider	8329565
PubChem CID	10154057
CompTox Dashboard (EPA)	DTXSID001045437
- InChI: InChI=1S/Cu.NO3/c;2-1(3)4/q+1;-1 Key: XVOMHXSMRIJNDW-UHFFFAOYSA-N
- SMILES: [N+](=O)([O-])[O-].[Cu+]

Properties
Chemical formula	CuNO_{3}
Molar mass	125.5509
- Except where otherwise noted, data are given for materials in their standard state (at 25 °C [77 °F], 100 kPa). Infobox references

Copper(I) nitrate is a proposed inorganic compound with formula of CuNO_{3}. It has not been characterized by X-ray crystallography. It is the focus of one publication, which describes unsuccessful efforts to isolate the compound. Another nonexistent simple copper(I) compound derived from an oxyanion is cuprous perchlorate. On the other hand, cuprous sulfate is known.

== Derivatives ==
The nitrate salt of the acetonitrile complex, i.e., [Cu(MeCN)_{4}]NO_{3}, is generated by the reaction of silver nitrate with a suspension of copper metal in acetonitrile.

Cu + AgNO_{3} + 4 CH_{3}CN → [Cu(CH_{3}CN)_{4}]NO_{3} + Ag

Tertiary phosphine complexes of the type [Cu(P(C_{6}H_{5})_{3})_{3}]NO_{3} are prepared by the reduction of copper(II) nitrate by the phosphine.
