= Copper peroxide =

Chemical compound - an oxide of copper with formula CuO2

Copper(II) peroxide
Names
- IUPAC name Copper(II) peroxide

Identifiers
CAS Number	12019-06-6
3D model (JSmol)	Interactive image
ChemSpider	13333045
CompTox Dashboard (EPA)	DTXSID501045432
- InChI: InChI=1S/Cu.O2/c;1-2/q+2;-2 Key: CNBDXDKFMUKCIQ-UHFFFAOYSA-N
- SMILES: [Cu+2].[O-][O-]

Properties
Chemical formula	Cu(O_{2})
Molar mass	95.945 g/mol
Appearance	Various

Related compounds
Related compounds	Copper(IV) oxide; Alkali metal cuprates(III)
- Except where otherwise noted, data are given for materials in their standard state (at 25 °C [77 °F], 100 kPa). Infobox references

Copper peroxide is an inorganic compound with the chemical formula Cu(O_{2}). The 1:2 ratio of copper and oxygen would be consistent with copper in its common +2 oxidation state and a peroxide group. Cu(O_{2}) has attracted interest from a computational perspective.

Older literature claims that treatment of cold suspended Cu(OH)_{2} with H_{2}O_{2} creates a brown hydrate of "copper dioxide," which rapidly decomposes in the presence of water to form ill-defined green and yellow salts above 0 °C.

== History ==
Species claimed to be "copper peroxide" have been claimed, e.g., by the reaction of cold solutions of Schweizer's reagent—a source of copper(II)—and hydrogen peroxide. The Schweizer's reagent used must not contain excess ammonia.

It was once claimed to result from the very slow reaction of finely divided cupric oxide with cold hydrogen peroxide.

It has been claimed that brown "copper dioxide" synthesized from Cu(OH)_{2} can be dried above 100 °C without decomposition if the product is thoroughly rid of moisture via alcohol washings. The resulting product is claimed to be a copper peroxide hydrate.

Several well-characterized molecular copper peroxide complexes have been reported, but these species always feature supporting organic ligands.

== Structure ==
Several substances claimed to be inorganic copper(II) peroxides have been reported, with empirical formulae:

- Cu(O_{2})·H_{2}O, a dark brown solid prepared by the reaction of freshly-made (blue) Cu(OH)_{2} with moderate-concentration solutions of H_{2}O_{2} between −20 °C and 20 °C. An alternative route is the reaction of an ethanol–water solution of CuCl_{2} with H_{2}O_{2}, followed by ethanolic KOH, at −40 to −50 °C. Possible structures include Cu(OH)(OOH) (mixed hydroxide-hydroperoxide) and Cu(O_{2})·H_{2}O (hydrate). Electron spin resonance measurements indicate it does not contain CuO. An early publication claims it turns olive-green with age, as well as upon reaction with excess peroxide.
- Cu(O_{2})·H_{2}O_{2}·H_{2}O, prepared by the reaction of freshly-made Cu(OH)_{2} with concentrated solutions of hydrogen peroxide between −36 °C and 20 °C. A possible structure is the perhydrate Cu(OH)(OOH)·H_{2}O_{2}.
- Cu_{2}(O_{2})(OOH), an olive-green solid claimed to be obtainable at −79 °C.

Computational analysis suggests that gaseous Cu(O_{2}) adopts an end-on configuration consistent with Cu^{+}O^{−}_{2}, copper(I) superoxide.
