= Red plague (corrosion) =

Corrosion of silver-plated copper

Red plague is an accelerated corrosion of copper when plated with silver. After storage, damage or use in high-humidity environment, cuprous oxide forms on the surface of the parts. The corrosion is identifiable by presence of patches of brown-red powder deposit on the exposed copper.

Red plague is caused by normally occurring electrode potential difference between the copper and silver, leading to galvanic corrosion occurring in pits or breaks in the silver plating. It develops in the presence of moisture and oxygen when the porosity of the silver layer allows them to come in contact with the copper-silver interface. It is an electrochemical corrosion—a copper-silver galvanic cell forms and the copper acts as sacrificial anode. In suitable conditions, the corrosion can proceed rather quickly and lead to total circuit failure.

More details can be seen in ESA document PSS-01-720, with details on determining the susceptibility of silver-plated copper wire to red plague corrosion found in ECSS-Q-ST-70-20C.

It is not to be confused with purple plague, a type of galvanic corrosion that occurs between gold and aluminum.
