= Copper(I) oxide =

Chemical compound – an oxide of copper with formula Cu2O

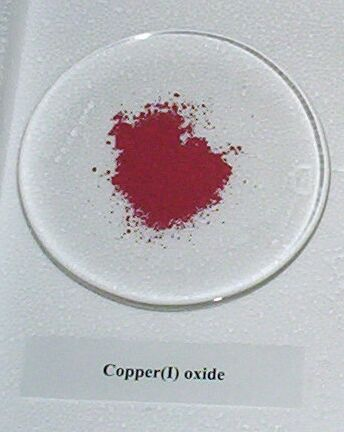
- Copper(I) oxide

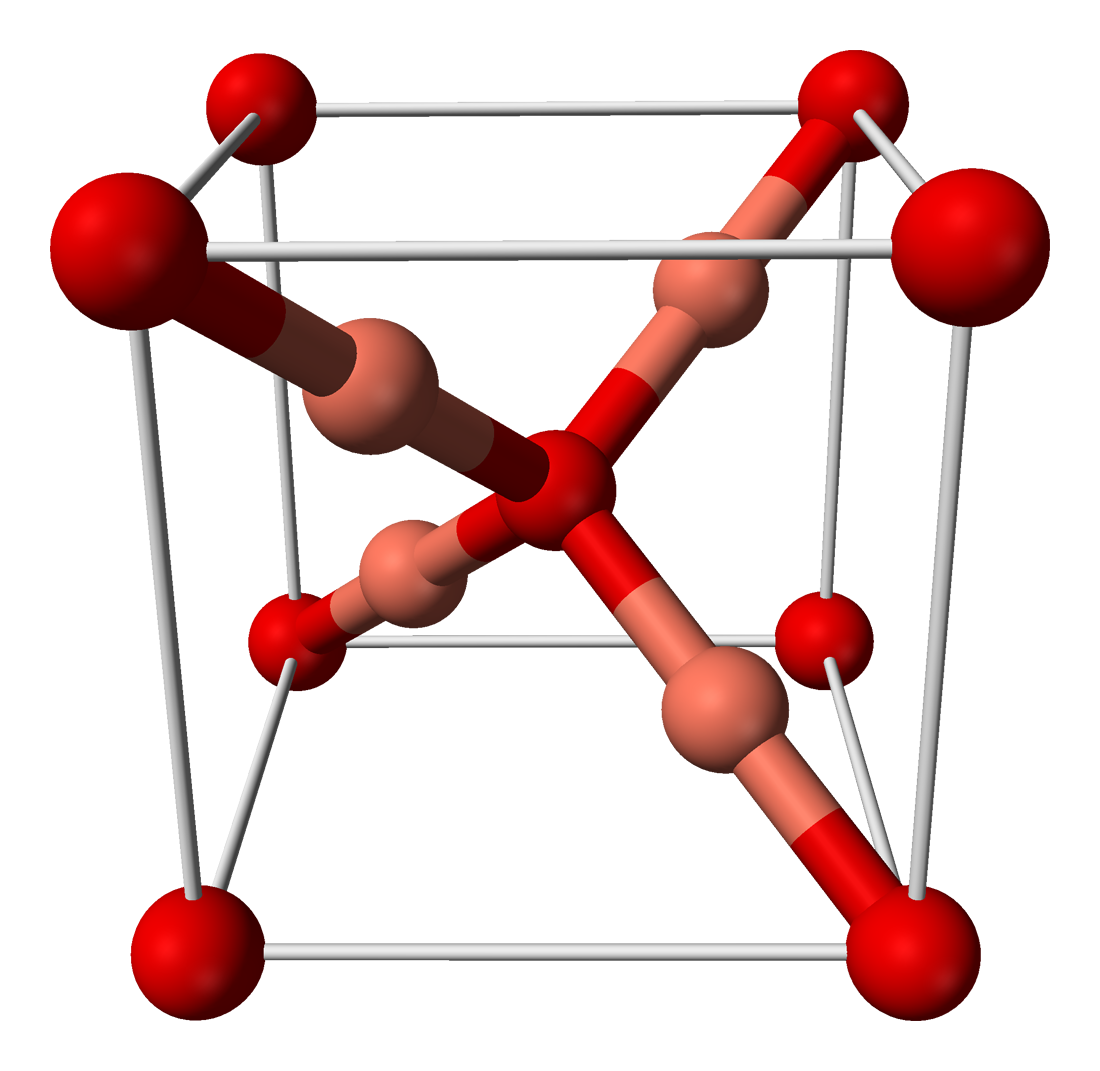
- Copper(I) oxide unit cell Unit cell

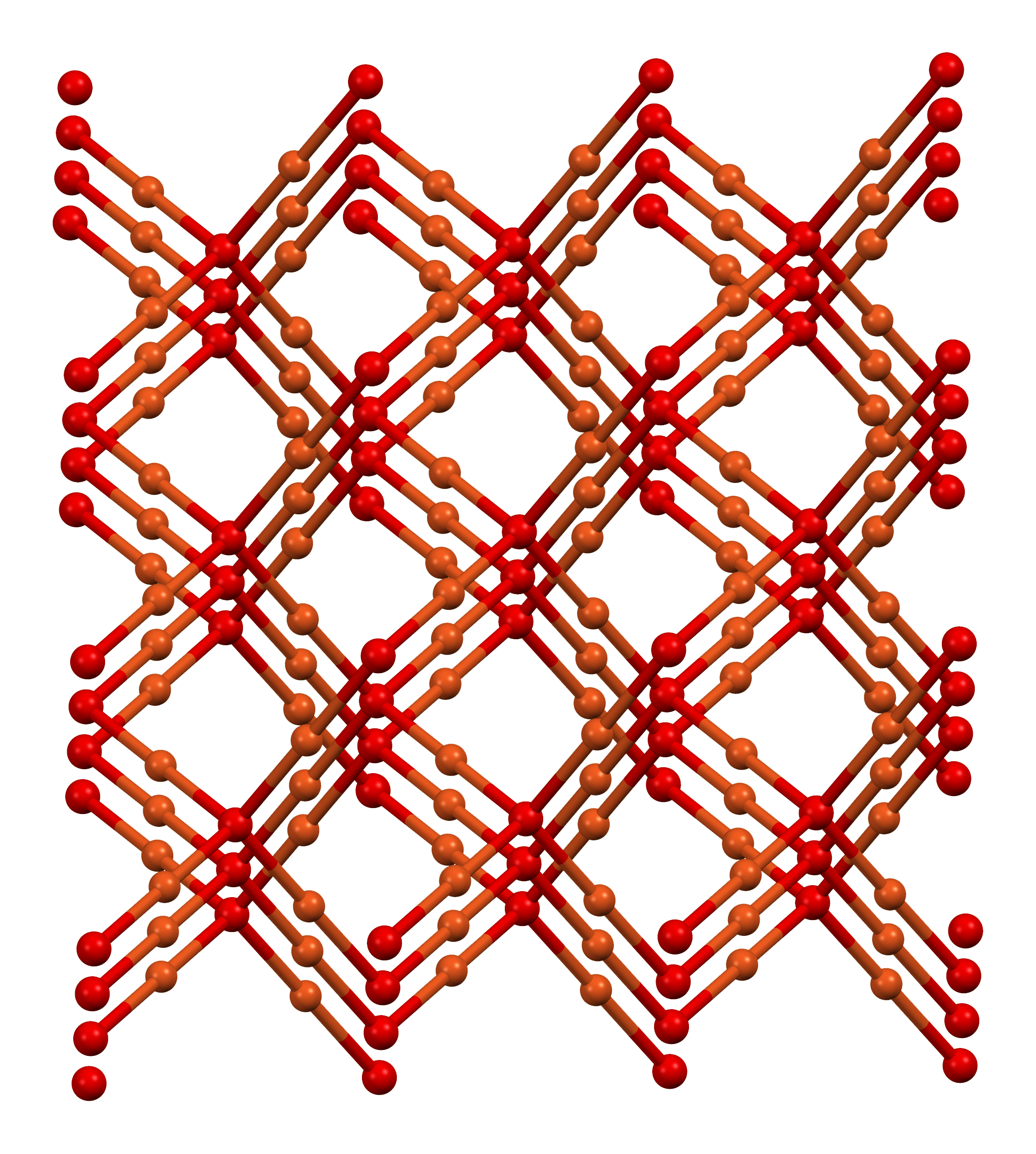
- Crystal packing

Names
- IUPAC name Copper(I) oxide
- Other names: Cuprous oxide; Dicopper oxide; Cuprite; Red copper oxide

Identifiers
CAS Number	1317-39-1
3D model (JSmol)	Interactive image; Interactive image
ChEBI	CHEBI:81908
ChemSpider	8488659
ECHA InfoCard	100.013.883
EC Number	215-270-7
KEGG	C18714
PubChem CID	10313194
RTECS number	GL8050000
UNII	T8BEA5064F
UN number	3077
CompTox Dashboard (EPA)	DTXSID0034489
- InChI: InChI=1S/2Cu.O/q2*+1;-2 Key: KRFJLUBVMFXRPN-UHFFFAOYSA-N; InChI=1/2Cu.O/rCu2O/c1-3-2 Key: BERDEBHAJNAUOM-YQWGQOGZAF; InChI=1/2Cu.O/q2*+1;-2 Key: KRFJLUBVMFXRPN-UHFFFAOYAM
- SMILES: [Cu]O[Cu]; [Cu+].[Cu+].[O-2]

Properties
Chemical formula	Cu_{2}O
Molar mass	143.091 g·mol^{−1}
Appearance	red-brown cubic crystals
Density	6.0 g/cm^{3}
Melting point	1,244 °C (2,271 °F; 1,517 K)
Boiling point	1,800 °C (3,270 °F; 2,070 K) decomposes
Solubility in water	0.0001 g/L
Band gap	0.51 eV
Magnetic susceptibility (χ)	−20×10^{−6} cm^{3}/mol
Thermal conductivity	3.74 k/(W·m^{-1}·K^{-1}) at 102 K (−276 °F; −171 °C); 7.76 k/(W·m^{-1}·K^{-1}) at 163 K (−166 °F; −110 °C); 5.58 k/(W·m^{-1}·K^{-1}) at 299 K (79 °F; 26 °C); 4.86 k/(W·m^{-1}·K^{-1}) at 360 K (188 °F; 87 °C)

Structure
Crystal structure	cubic
Space group	Pn3̅m, #224
Point group	m3̅m
Lattice constant	a = 4.25 Å, b = 4.25 Å, c = 4.25 Å α = 90°, β = 90°, γ = 90°
Lattice volume (V)	76.59 Å^{3}
Formula units (Z)	2

Thermochemistry
Heat capacity (C)	63.6 J⋅mol^{−1}·K^{-1}
Std molar entropy (S^{⦵}_{298})	93.1 J⋅mol^{−1}·K^{-1}
Std enthalpy of formation (Δ_{f}H^{⦵}_{298})	−168.6 kJ⋅mol^{−1}
Gibbs free energy (Δ_{f}G^{⦵})	−146.0 kJ⋅mol^{−1}
Enthalpy of fusion (Δ_{f}H^{⦵}_{fus})	65.6 kJ⋅mol^{−1}

Hazards
- GHS labelling
Pictograms	(GHS05: Corrosive) (GHS07: Exclamation mark) (GHS09: Environmental hazard)
Signal word	Danger
Hazard statements	H302+H332, H318, H410
Precautionary statements	P261, P264, P270, P271, P280, P301+P312+P330, P304+P340+P312, P305+P351+P338+P310, P391, P501
NFPA 704 (fire diamond)	3 0 0
Threshold limit value (TLV)	1 mg/m^{3} (TWA)
- NIOSH (US health exposure limits)
PEL (Permissible)	TWA 1 mg/m^{3} (as Cu)
REL (Recommended)	TWA 1 mg/m^{3} (as Cu)
IDLH (Immediate danger)	TWA 100 mg/m^{3} (as Cu)

Related compounds
Other anions	Copper(I) chloride; Copper(I) sulfide; Copper(I) selenide
Other cations	Copper(II) oxide; Silver(I) oxide; Nickel(II) oxide; Zinc oxide
- Except where otherwise noted, data are given for materials in their standard state (at 25 °C [77 °F], 100 kPa). verify (what is ?) Infobox references

Copper(I) oxide or cuprous oxide is the inorganic compound with the formula Cu_{2}O. It is one of the principal oxides of copper, the other being copper(II) oxide or cupric oxide (CuO). The compound can appear either yellow or red, depending on the size of the particles. Cuprous oxide is found as the mineral cuprite. It is a component of some antifouling paints, and has other applications including some that exploit its property as a semiconductor.

== Properties ==
Like all copper(I) compounds, cuprous oxide is diamagnetic. It does not readily hydrate to cuprous hydroxide.

Copper(I) oxide dissolves in concentrated ammonia solution to form the colourless complex [Cu(NH_{3})_{2}]^{+}, which is easily oxidized in air to the blue [Cu(NH_{3})_{4}(H_{2}O)_{2}]^{2+}.

Cuprous oxide is attacked by acids. Hydrochloric acid gives the chloride complex CuCl^{−}_{2}. Sulfuric acid and nitric acid produce copper(II) sulfate and copper(II) nitrate, respectively.

== Structure ==
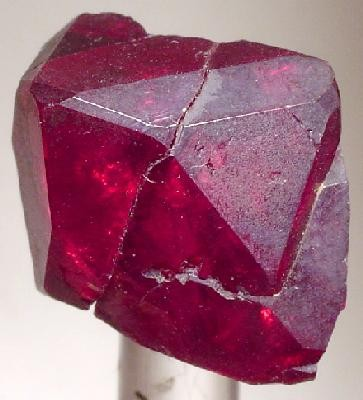
Large crystal of the mineral form of copper(I) oxide (cuprite).

In terms of their coordination spheres, copper centres are 2-coordinated and the oxides are tetrahedral. Cu_{2}O crystallizes in a cubic structure with a lattice constant a_{l} = 4.27 Å. The copper atoms arrange in a Bravais lattice fcc sublattice, the oxygen atoms in a bcc sublattice. One sublattice is shifted by a quarter of the body diagonal. The space group is Pn3̅m, which includes the point group with full octahedral symmetry.

== Preparation ==
Pourbaix diagram for copper in uncomplexed media (anions other than OH^{−} not considered). Ion concentration 0.001 mol/kg water. Temperature 25 °C (77 °F).

Copper(I) oxide may be produced by several methods. Most straightforwardly, it arises via the oxidation of copper metal:

4 Cu + O_{2} → 2 Cu_{2}O

Additives such as water and acids affect the rate as well as the further oxidation to copper(II) oxides. It is also produced commercially by reduction of copper(II) solutions with sulfur dioxide.

Alternatively, it may be prepared via the reduction of copper(II) acetate with hydrazine:

4 Cu(O_{2}CCH_{3})_{2} + N_{2}H_{4} + 2 H_{2}O → 2 Cu_{2}O + 8 CH_{3}CO_{2}H + N_{2}

Copper(I) chloride solutions react with base to give the same material. In all cases, the color of the cuprous oxide is highly sensitive to the procedural details. Cu_{2}O degrades to copper(II) oxide in moist air.

Formation of copper(I) oxide is the basis of the Fehling's test and Benedict's test for reducing sugars. These sugars reduce an alkaline solution of a copper(II) salt, giving a bright red precipitate of Cu_{2}O.

It forms on silver-plated copper parts exposed to moisture when the silver layer is porous or damaged. This kind of corrosion is known as red plague.

== Applications ==
The dominant use of cuprous oxide is as a component of antifouling paints.

Cuprous oxide is also commonly used as a pigment and a fungicide.

=== Semiconductor and related uses ===
Rectifier diodes based on this material have been used industrially as early as 1924, long before silicon became the standard. Copper(I) oxide is also responsible for the pink color in a positive Benedict's test. In the history of semiconductor physics, Cu_{2}O is one of the most studied materials. Many applications have been demonstrated first in this material:

- Semiconductor diodes
- Phonoritons ("a coherent superposition of exciton, photon, and phonon")

The lowest excitons in Cu_{2}O are extremely long lived; absorption lineshapes have been demonstrated with neV linewidths, which is the narrowest bulk exciton resonance ever observed. The associated quadrupole polaritons have low group velocity approaching the speed of sound. Thus, light moves almost as slowly as sound in this medium, which results in high polariton densities. Another unusual feature of the ground state excitons is that all primary scattering mechanisms are known quantitatively.

Cu_{2}O was the first substance where an entirely parameter-free model of absorption linewidth broadening by temperature could be established, allowing the corresponding absorption coefficient to be deduced. It can be shown using Cu_{2}O that the Kramers–Kronig relations do not apply to polaritons.

In December 2021, Toshiba disclosed a transparent Cu_{2}O thin-film solar cell. The cell achieved an 8.4% energy conversion efficiency, the highest efficiency ever reported for any cell of this type as of 2021. The cells could be used for high-altitude platform station applications and electric vehicles.

== Similar compounds ==
An example of natural copper(I,II) oxide is the mineral paramelaconite, Cu_{4}O_{3} or Cu_{2}^{I}Cu_{2}^{II}O_{3}.

== See also ==
- Copper(II) oxide
- Copper oxides
