= Copper ibuprofenate =

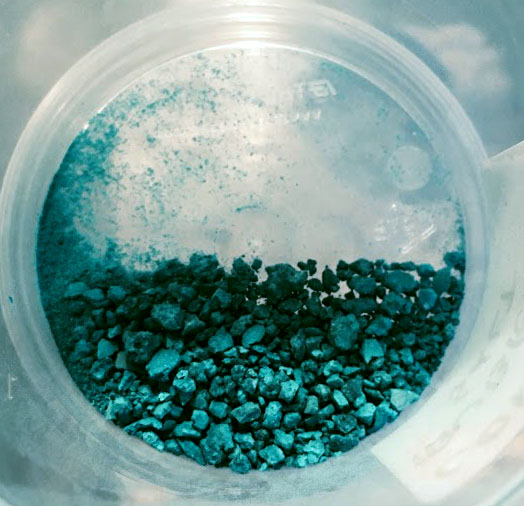
- Anhydrous

- Hydrated

- R = (CH_{3})_{2}CHCH_{2}C_{6}H_{4}CH(CH_{3})-

Names
- IUPAC name bis[2-(4-isobutylphenyl)propionato]copper(II)

Identifiers
CAS Number	66840-44-6
3D model (JSmol)	Interactive image
PubChem CID	23978
CompTox Dashboard (EPA)	DTXSID201029390
- InChI: InChI=1S/4C13H17O2.2Cu/c41-9(2)8-11-4-6-12(7-5-11)10(3)13(14)15;;/h44-7,9-10H,8H2,1-3H3;;/q4*-3;2*+6 Key: HEFOJHHJEKPEDO-UHFFFAOYSA-N
- SMILES: c0cc(CC(C)C)ccc0C(C)C-OCu+2(OC-C(C)c0ccc(CC(C)C)cc0)OC-C(C)c0ccc(CC(C)C)cc0

Properties
Chemical formula	C_{52}H_{68}Cu_{2}O_{8}
Molar mass	948.200 g·mol^{−1}
Appearance	Blue Powder
Density	1.299 g/cm^{3}
Solubility in water	Slightly soluble
Solubility in isopropanol	Slightly soluble

Related compounds
Other anions	Copper aspirinate
Related compounds	Ibuprofen
- Except where otherwise noted, data are given for materials in their standard state (at 25 °C [77 °F], 100 kPa). verify (what is ?) Infobox references

Copper ibuprofenate is a coordination complex consisting of copper(II) and the conjugate base of ibuprofen.

== Structure ==
Copper ibuprofenate adopts a typical Chinese lantern structure, as seen for many transition metal carboxylate complexes. X-ray crystallography reveals a polymer with a bonding motif very similar to that of copper(II) trifluoroacetate.

== Preparation ==
The compound is prepared by the reaction of sodium ibuprofenate with copper(II) sulfate.

== Uses ==
It has been suggested that copper complexes of anti-inflammatory drugs are more active than the parent drug and produce fewer gastrointestinal side-effects.

In 2008, a United States patent was issued for the utilization of ibuprofenate complexes (including copper ibuprofenate) as a wood preservative.
