= Copper sulfate =

Copper sulfate may refer to:

- Copper(II) sulfate, CuSO_{4}, a common, blue-green compound used as a fungicide and herbicide.
- Copper(I) sulfate, Cu_{2}SO_{4}, an unstable white solid which is uncommonly used.
