= Copper aspirinate =

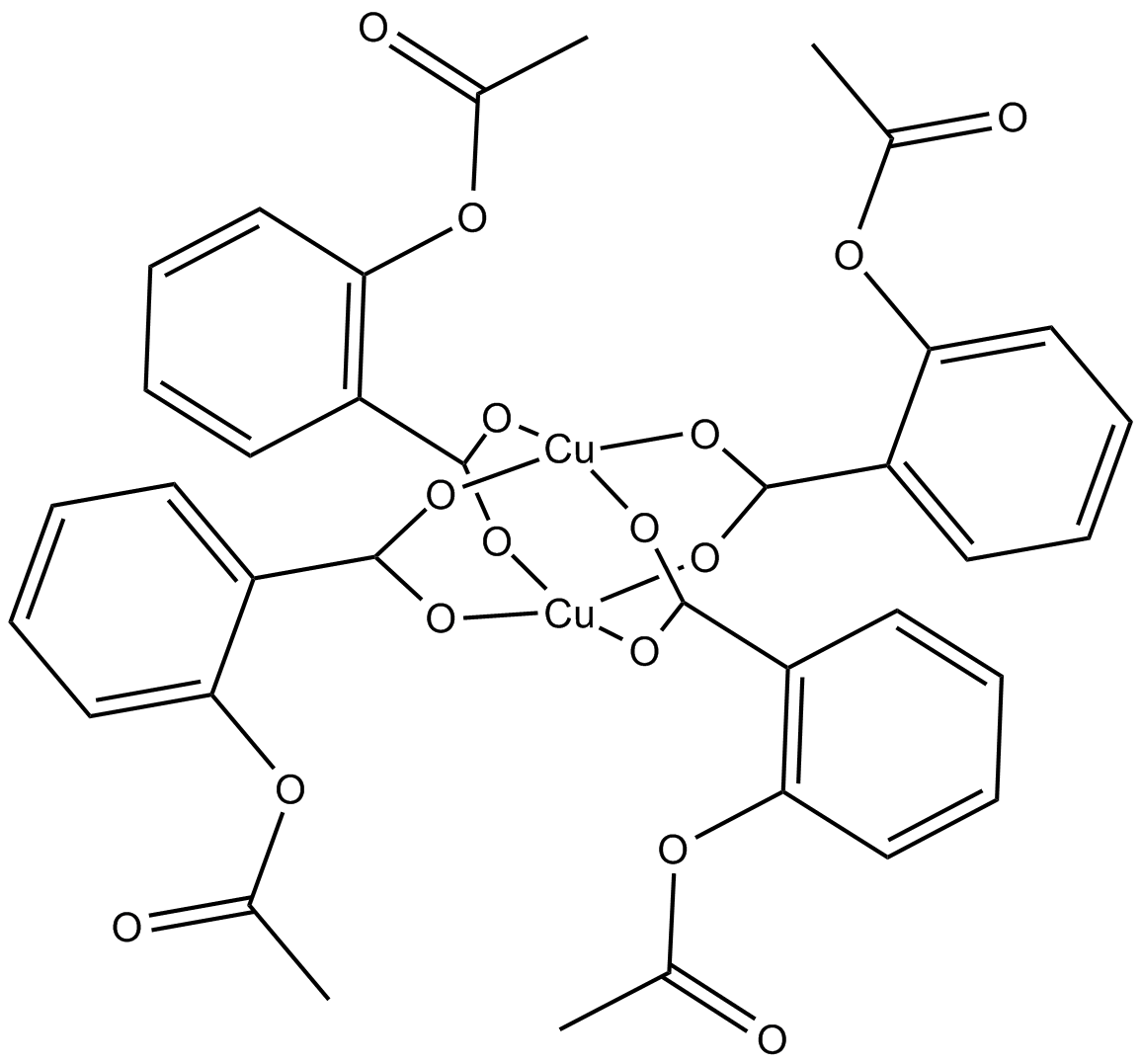

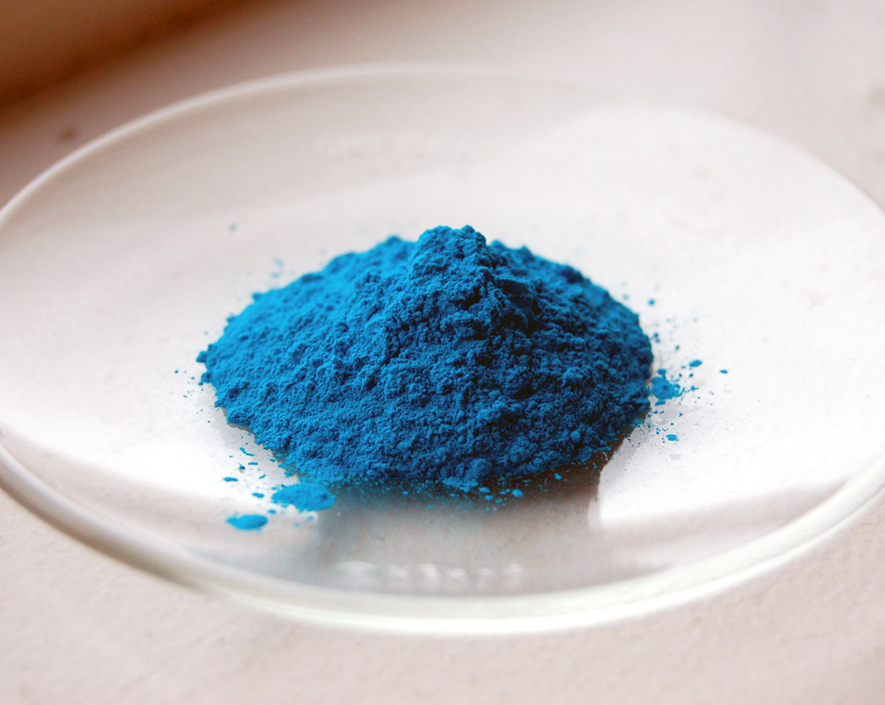

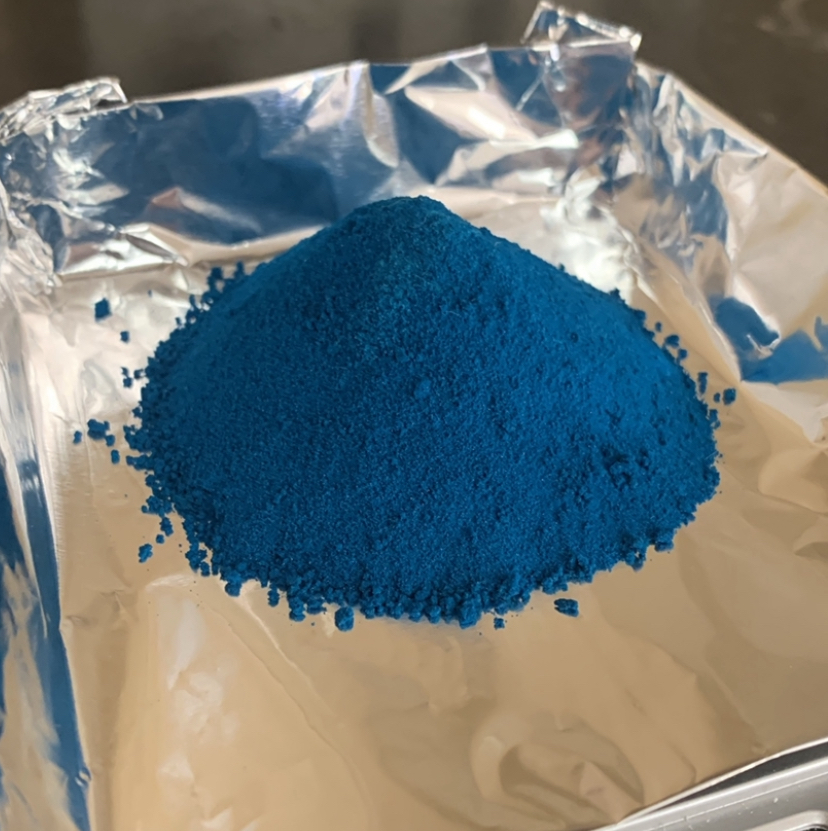

Names
- IUPAC name dicopper;tetrakis(2-acetyloxybenzoate)
- Other names: Copper, tetrakis[mu-[2-(acetyloxy)benzoato-kappaO:kappaO']]di-; tetrakis-μ-acetylsalicylato-dicopper(II); copper(II) aspirinate; cupric acetylsalicylate; cupric aspirinate; cupric aspirin complex

Identifiers
CAS Number	23642-01-5
3D model (JSmol)	Interactive image; Interactive image
ChemSpider	83280
ECHA InfoCard	100.041.622
PubChem CID	92244
UNII	YR4ND62LYK
CompTox Dashboard (EPA)	DTXSID4066919
- InChI: InChI=1S/4C9H8O4.2Cu/c4*1-6(10)13-8-5-3-2-4-7(8)9(11)12;;/h4*2-5H,1H3,(H,11,12);;/q;;;;2*+2/p-4 Key: BXBJCCCIFADZBU-UHFFFAOYSA-J; InChI=1/4C9H8O4.2Cu/c4*1-6(10)13-8-5-3-2-4-7(8)9(11)12;;/h4*2-5H,1H3,(H,11,12);;/q;;;;2*+2/p-4 Key: BXBJCCCIFADZBU-XBHQNQODAY
- SMILES: CC(=O)Oc1ccccc1C(=O)[O-].CC(=O)Oc1ccccc1C(=O)[O-].CC(=O)Oc1ccccc1C(=O)[O-].CC(=O)Oc1ccccc1C(=O)[O-].[Cu+2].[Cu+2]; CC(=O)Oc0ccccc0[C-](O[Cu+2]123)O[Cu+2](O[C-](O1)c0ccccc0OC(=O)C)(O[C-](O2)c0ccccc0OC(=O)C)O[C-](O3)c0ccccc0OC(=O)C

Properties
Chemical formula	Cu_{2}C_{36}H_{28}O_{16}
Molar mass	843.696 g·mol^{−1}
Appearance	bright blue solid
Melting point	255 °C (491 °F; 528 K) (decomposes)

Structure
Crystal structure	monoclinic
Space group	P2_{1}/c
Lattice constant	a = 8.208, b = 10.39, c = 21.56 α = 90°, β = 104.74°, γ = 90°
Formula units (Z)	4 units per cell

Pharmacology
- Pharmacokinetics
Biological half-life	8.67 h (Human)

Hazards
- NIOSH (US health exposure limits)
PEL (Permissible)	TWA 1 mg/m^{3} (as Cu)
REL (Recommended)	TWA 1 mg/m^{3} (as Cu)
IDLH (Immediate danger)	TWA 100 mg/m^{3} (as Cu)

Related compounds
Other anions	Copper benzoate; Copper salicylate
Related compounds	Aspirin
- Except where otherwise noted, data are given for materials in their standard state (at 25 °C [77 °F], 100 kPa). verify (what is ?) Infobox references

Copper(II) aspirinate is an aspirin chelate of copper(II) cations (Cu^{2+}). It is a bright blue solid, forming monoclinic crystals.

== Preparation ==
Copper aspirinate can be prepared treating a solution of aspirin and potassium bicarbonate with copper(II) sulfate solution.

Heating an equimolar mixture of aspirin and copper salicylate tetrahydrate in 50% aqueous ethanol results in dark blue crystals.

== Research ==
Copper aspirinate has been investigated for its claimed anti-inflammatory, antioxidative, and antithrombotic properties as well as a potential treatment for skin disorders.

The use of copper aspirinate as a pigment in PVC and polystyrene has also been investigated.
