= Paramelaconite =

Oxide mineral

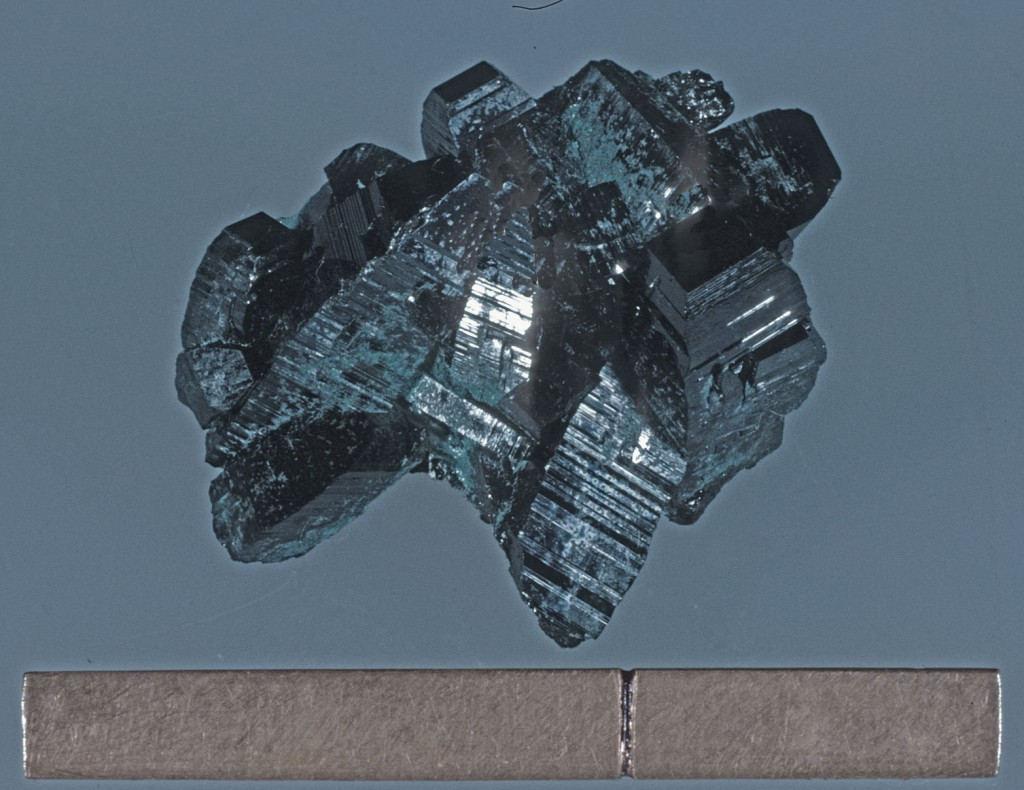
- Paramelaconite from the Copper Queen Mine, Cochise County, Arizona, USA

General
- Category: Oxide mineral
- Formula: Cu^{I}_{2}Cu^{II}_{2}O_{3} (or Cu_{4}O_{3})
- IMA symbol: Pml
- Strunz classification: 4.AA.15
- Dana classification: 4.6.4.1
- Crystal system: Tetragonal
- Crystal class: Ditetragonal dipyramidal (4/mmm); H-M group: (4/m 2/m 2/m)
- Space group: I4_{1}/amd {I4_{1}/a 2/m 2/d}
- Unit cell: a = 5.837 Å, c = 9.932 Å; Z = 4

Identification
- Color: Black to black with a slight purple tint White with pinkish brown tint in reflected light
- Crystal habit: Occurs as striated prismatic crystals; massive
- Cleavage: None observed
- Fracture: Conchoidal
- Tenacity: Brittle
- Mohs scale hardness: 4.5
- Luster: Sub-adamantine, greasy, sub-metallic
- Streak: Brown-black
- Diaphaneity: Opaque
- Specific gravity: 6.04–6.11 (measured)
- Optical properties: Uniaxial
- Pleochroism: Weak
- Ultraviolet fluorescence: Not fluorescent
- Solubility: Soluble in HCl and HNO_{3}

Paramelaconite is a rare, black-colored copper(I,II) oxide mineral with formula Cu^{I}_{2}Cu^{II}_{2}O_{3} (or Cu_{4}O_{3}). It was discovered in the Copper Queen Mine in Bisbee, Arizona, about 1890. It was described in 1892 and more fully in 1941. Its name is derived from the Greek word for "near" and the similar mineral melaconite, now known as tenorite.

== Description and occurrence ==
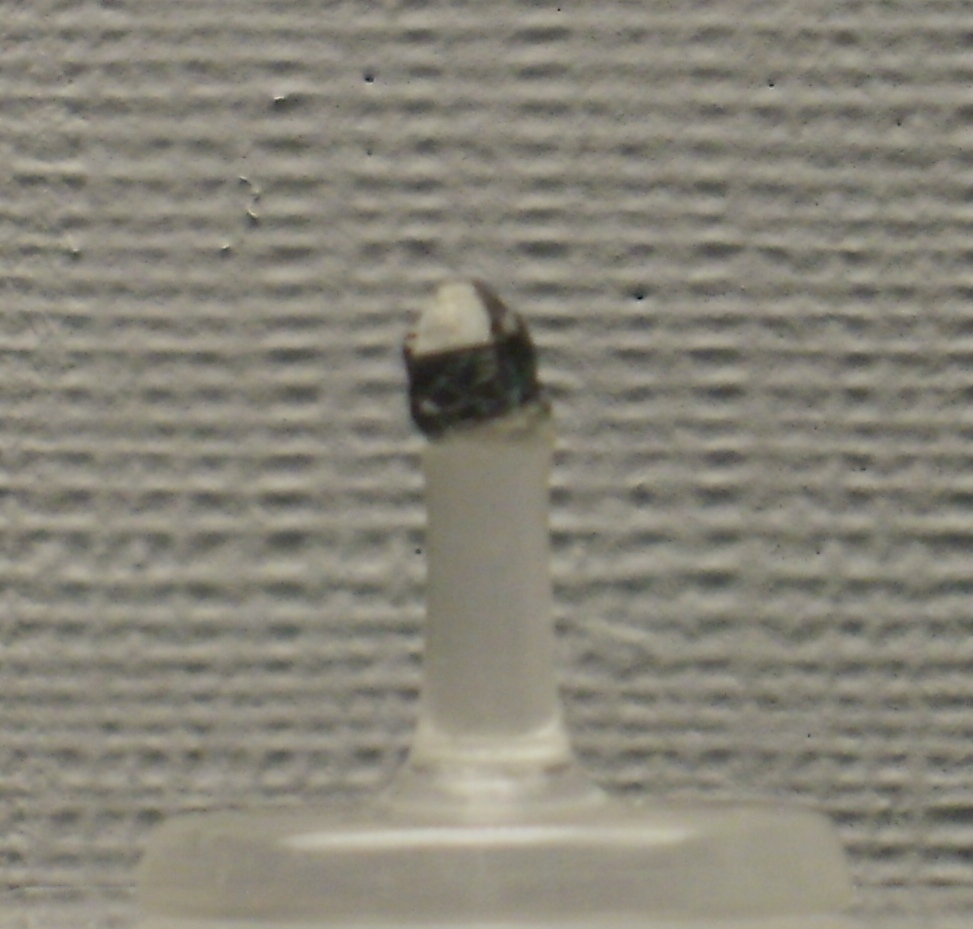
Type material from the Copper Queen Mine held at the A. E. Seaman Mineral Museum

Paramelaconite is black to black with a slight purple tint in color, and is white with a pinkish brown tint in reflected light. The mineral occurs with massive habit or as crystals up to 7.5 cm (3 in). A yellow color is formed when the mineral is dissolved in hydrochloric acid, a blue color when dissolved in nitric acid, and a slightly brown precipitate when exposed to ammonium hydroxide. When heated, paramelaconite breaks down into a mixture of tenorite and cuprite.

Paramelaconite is a very rare mineral; many specimens purported as such are in fact mixtures of cuprite and tenorite. Paramelaconite forms as a secondary mineral in hydrothermal deposits of copper. It occurs in association with atacamite, chrysocolla, connellite, cuprite, dioptase, goethite, malachite, plancheite, and tenorite. The mineral has been found in Cyprus, the United Kingdom, and the United States.

== Structure ==
Paramelaconite crystallizes in the tetragonal crystal system. Its space group was correctly identified by Frondel as I4_{1}/amd. In 1978, O'Keeffe and Bovin determined the formula to be Cu_{4}O_{3}, specifically Cu^{I}_{2}Cu^{II}_{2}O_{3}. There has been misunderstanding and misreporting of the mineral's crystal structure, due in part to a typographical error in O'Keeffe and Bovin's paper and the commonality of choosing an incorrect origin for the I4_{1}/amd space group. At the same time as O'Keeffe and Bovin's report, a paper by Datta and Jeffery determined a structure for the mineral based on the incorrect formula Cu^{II}_{12}Cu^{I}_{4}O_{14}. The formula originated from incorrectly assuming that Frondel's analysis was of a homogeneous crystal of paramelaconite.

== Synthesis ==
The synthesis of microscopic paramelaconite was reported in 1986 as a product of the decomposition of CuO in an electron microscope. However, this method is not easily scaled up to produce samples large enough for study. Reduction of CuO and decomposition in a vacuum and controlled oxidation of Cu_{2}O failed to synthesize the mineral. Experiments at the National Bureau of Standards using aqueous solutions up to 250 °C produced only Cu_{2}O and CuO. Oxidation of copper or its alloys also does not produce paramelaconite, despite reports to the contrary.

The first unequivocal synthesis of the mineral was achieved in the 1990s and published in 1996. The material produced was 35% Cu_{4}O_{3}, 27% Cu_{2}O, and 38% CuO. The process consists of the leaching of copper or its oxides with concentrated aqueous ammonia in a Soxhlet extractor. The reaction forms a deep blue complex of cupric ammonium that is converted to a residue of black oxide in the apparatus.

== History ==
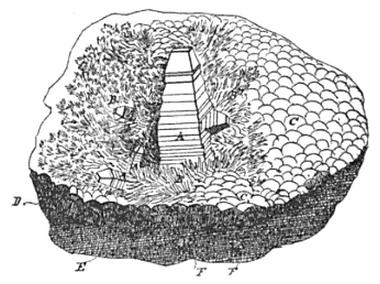
Drawing of a specimen found by Foote; the center pyramid is paramelaconite

Albert E. Foote visited the Copper Queen Mine about 1890, where he obtained two specimens containing unknown minerals. He could only associate them with anatase, but he thought it unlikely that the minerals were any form of titanium oxide. The specimens were sold to Clarence M. Bement at fifty dollars apiece, and with his permission, were studied by George Augustus Koenig. Bement's collection, including the specimens of paramelaconite, were purchased by J. P. Morgan in 1900 and given to the American Museum of Natural History.

Owing to its unique appearance, Koenig assigned the mineral as a new species. His description of the mineral appeared in an 1892 publication of the Academy of Natural Sciences of Philadelphia. He named the mineral paramelaconite from the Greek παρά, meaning "near", and the mineral melaconite (now known as tenorite), for its compositional similarity to melaconite. At the time, however, the mineral was not recognized as a valid species.

Clifford Frondel studied the mineral in more detail and published his results in the journal American Mineralogist in 1941. When the International Mineralogical Association was founded in 1959, paramelaconite was grandfathered as a valid mineral species. In the early 1960s, the third known specimen of paramelaconite was discovered from the Copper Queen Mine; Koenig donated it to the A. E. Seaman Mineral Museum. Other specimens in the museum, labeled as originating from the Algomah Mine in Ontonagon County, Michigan, were also found to contain paramelaconite.

The type material is held at the A. E. Seaman Mineral Museum in Houghton, Michigan, the American Museum of Natural History in New York City, Harvard University in Cambridge, Massachusetts, the National Museum of Natural History in Washington, D.C., and the Natural History Museum in London.
