= Copper(I) sulfate =

Chemical compound

Names
- IUPAC name Copper(I) sulfate
- Systematic IUPAC name Copper(I) sulfate
- Other names: Copper sulfate; Cuprous sulfate; Dicopper sulfate

Identifiers
CAS Number	17599-81-4
3D model (JSmol)	Interactive image
ChemSpider	118749
ECHA InfoCard	100.159.746
PubChem CID	134737
CompTox Dashboard (EPA)	DTXSID30889663
- InChI: InChI=1S/2Cu.H2O4S/c;;1-5(2,3)4/h;;(H2,1,2,3,4)/q2*+1;/p-2 Key: WIVXEZIMDUGYRW-UHFFFAOYSA-L; InChI=1/2Cu.H2O4S/c;;1-5(2,3)4/h;;(H2,1,2,3,4)/q2*+1;/p-2 Key: WIVXEZIMDUGYRW-NUQVWONBAI
- SMILES: [O-]S(=O)(=O)[O-].[Cu+].[Cu+]

Properties
Chemical formula	Cu_{2}SO_{4}
Molar mass	223.15 g mol^{−1}
Appearance	White
Density	4.12 g cm^{−3}
Melting point	110 °C
Solubility in water	decomposes

Structure
Crystal structure	orthorhombic
Space group	Fddd
Lattice constant	a = 4.748(3) Å, b = 13.96(1) Å, c = 10.86(1) Å
Formula units (Z)	8

Hazards
- GHS labelling
Pictograms	(GHS07: Exclamation mark) (GHS09: Environmental hazard)
Signal word	Warning
Hazard statements	H302, H315, H319, H400
Precautionary statements	P264, P264+P265, P270, P273, P280, P301+P317, P302+P352, P305+P351+P338, P321, P330, P332+P317, P337+P317, P362+P364, P391, P501
- NIOSH (US health exposure limits)
PEL (Permissible)	TWA 1 mg/m^{3} (as Cu)
REL (Recommended)	TWA 1 mg/m^{3} (as Cu)
IDLH (Immediate danger)	TWA 100 mg/m^{3} (as Cu)
- Except where otherwise noted, data are given for materials in their standard state (at 25 °C [77 °F], 100 kPa). Infobox references

Copper(I) sulfate, also known as cuprous sulfate, is an inorganic compound with the chemical formula Cu_{2}SO_{4}. It is a white solid, in contrast to copper(II) sulfate, which is blue in hydrous form. Compared to the commonly available reagent, copper(II) sulfate, copper(I) sulfate is unstable and not readily available.

== Structure ==
Cu_{2}SO_{4} crystallizes in the orthorhombic space group Fddd. Each oxygen in a sulfate anion is bridged to another sulfate by a copper atom, and the Cu−O distances are 196 pm.

== Synthesis ==
Cuprous sulfate is produced by the reaction of copper metal with sulfuric acid at 200 °C:

2 Cu + 2 H_{2}SO_{4} → Cu_{2}SO_{4} + SO_{2} + 2 H_{2}O

Cu_{2}SO_{4} can also be synthesized by the action of dimethyl sulfate on cuprous oxide:

Cu_{2}O + (CH_{3}O)_{2}SO_{2} → Cu_{2}SO_{4} + (CH_{3})_{2}O

== Reactions ==
The material is stable in dry air at room temperature but decomposes rapidly in presence of moisture or upon heating. It decomposes into copper(II) sulfate pentahydrate upon contact with water.

Cu_{2}SO_{4} + 5 H_{2}O → Cu + CuSO_{4} · 5 H_{2}O

== Related compounds ==
A copper(I) sulfate metal-organic framework (MOF) with the formula Cu_{2}(4,4′-bpy)_{2}SO_{4}·6(H_{2}O) has been characterized. It is prepared by hydrothermal synthesis involving copper(II) sulfate pentahydrate, L-aspartic acid, and 4,4′-bipyridine. It is a heterogeneous catalyst for the cyclopropanation of styrene, with high trans cyclopropane diastereoselectivity.
