= Copper salicylate =

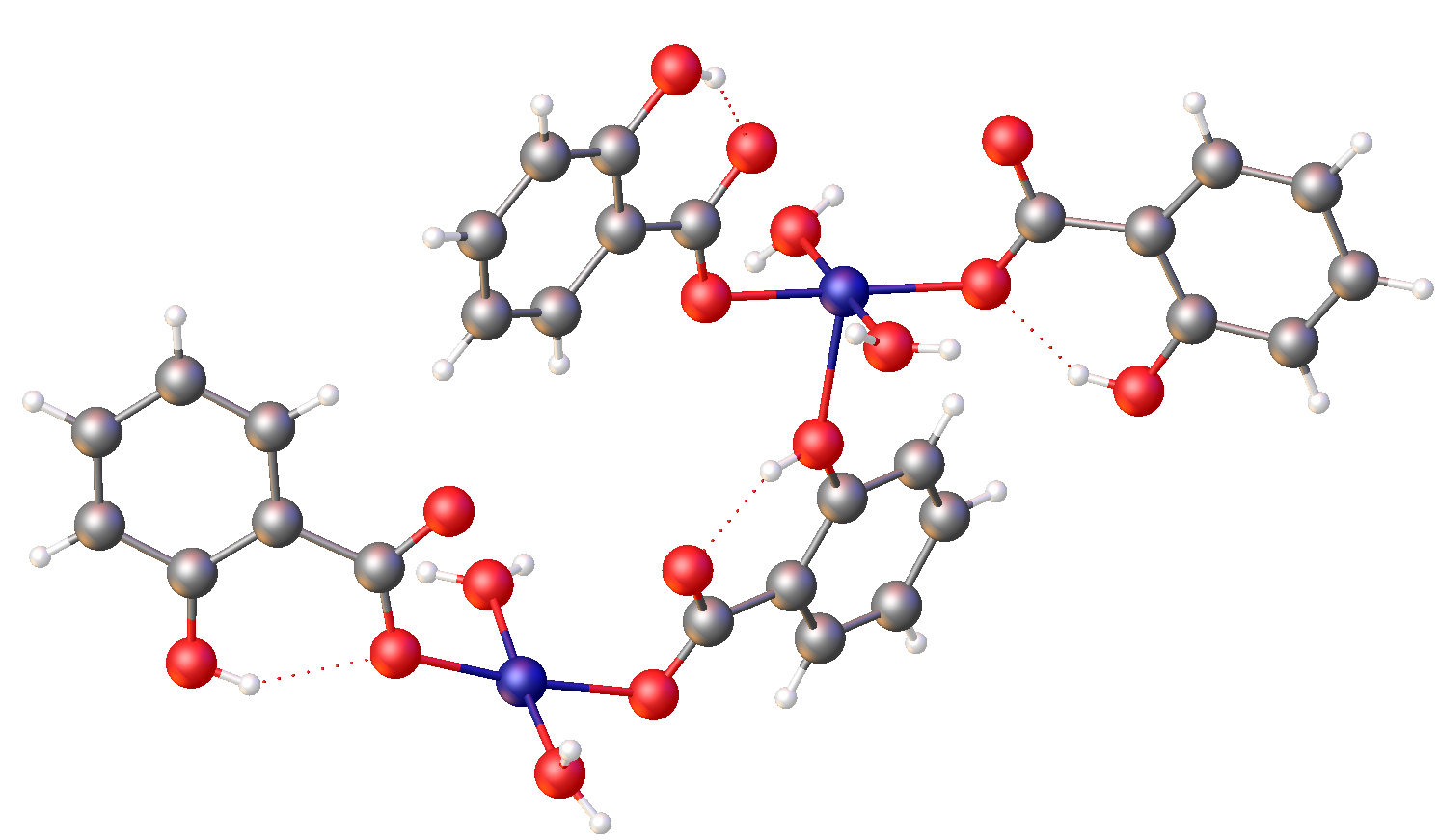
Structure of a hydrated copper(II) salicylate. Color code: red = O, blue = Cu, gray = C, white = H.

Copper salicylate describes a range of compounds containing copper(II) and salicylate. Many compounds are known. A simple species is:

[Cu(C_{6}H_{4}(OH)COO)_{2}(H_{2}O)_{2}]·H_{2}O.

Many adducts of copper(II) salicylates are known with amines and N-heterocyclic ligands.

== Complexes ==
=== With other organic compounds ===
Crystallization with dimethylacetamide (DMAA) produces various complexes such as:

[Cu_{2}(C_{6}H_{4}(OH)COO)_{4}(H_{2}O)]·2DMAA

This complex has a lantern structure.

=== Heterometallic Complexes ===
Heterometallic complexes with various metals and solvents also exist, such as (with DMAA) the copper-strontium complex, [CuSr(C_{6}H_{4}(OH)COO)_{4}(DMAA)_{4}(H_{2}O)], and the copper-barium complex, [CuBa(C_{6}H_{4}(OH)COO)_{4}(DMAA)_{4}(H_{2}O)]. Both these and the related Cu_{2} complex took an excessively long time to crystallize, especially the copper-strontium complex which required an entire month. They share the lantern structure of the Cu_{2} complex.
