= Copper(II) oxide =

Chemical compound – an oxide of copper with formula CuO

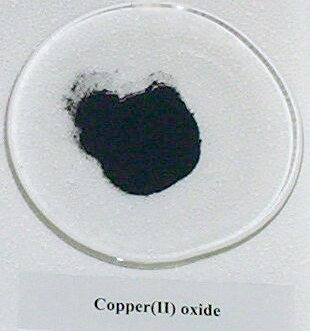

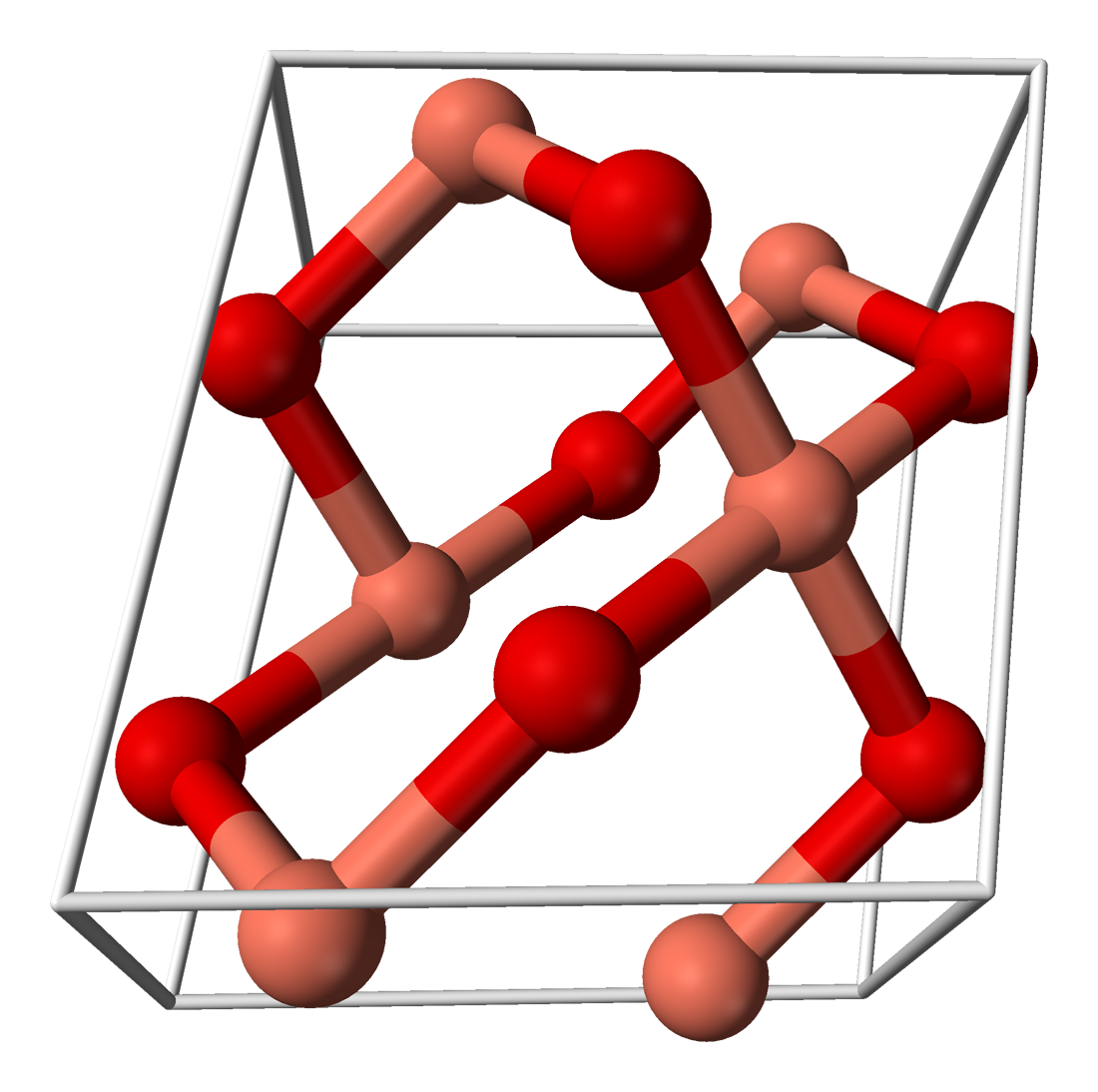

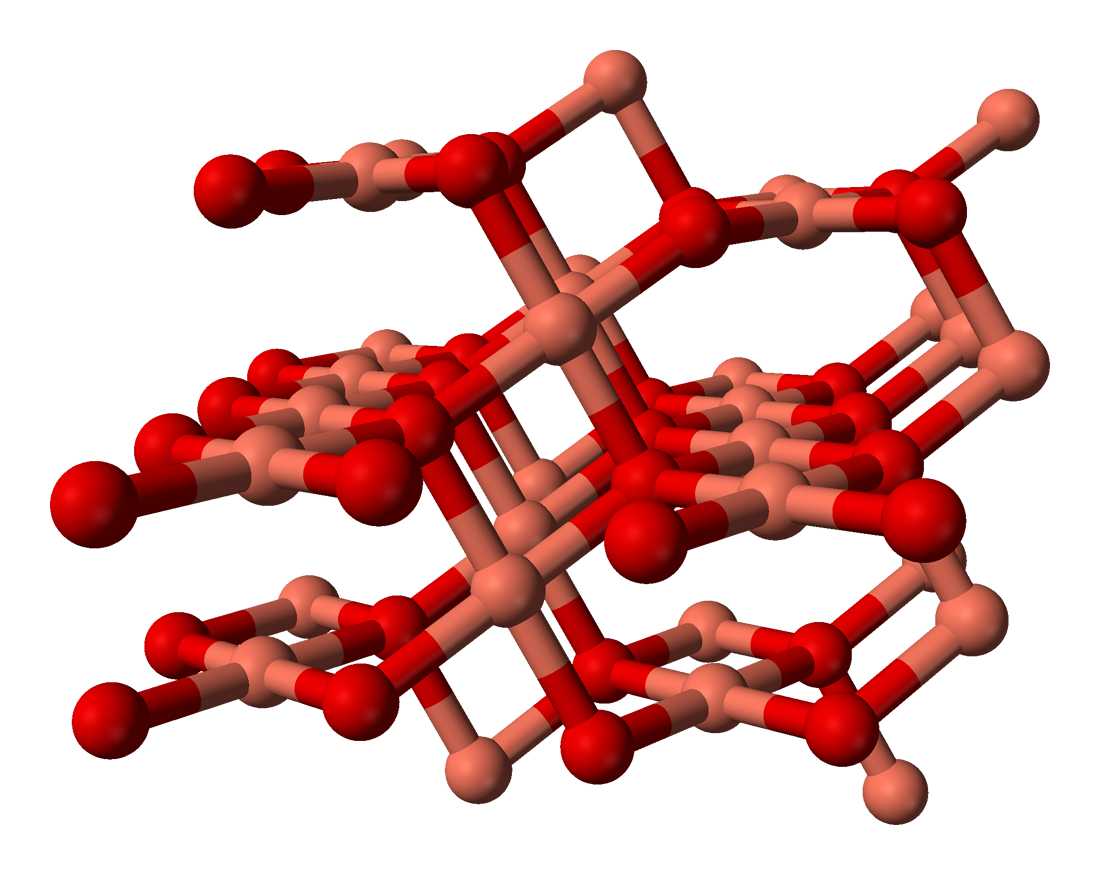

Names
- IUPAC name Copper(II) oxide
- Other names Cupric oxide

Identifiers
CAS Number	1317-38-0
3D model (JSmol)	Interactive image; Interactive image
ChEBI	CHEBI:75955
ChEMBL	ChEMBL1909057
ChemSpider	144499
ECHA InfoCard	100.013.882
EC Number	215-269-1
PubChem CID	14829
RTECS number	GL7900000
UNII	V1XJQ704R4
CompTox Dashboard (EPA)	DTXSID5034488
- InChI: InChI=1S/Cu.O/q+2;-2 Key: KKCXRELNMOYFLS-UHFFFAOYSA-N; InChI=1/Cu.O/rCuO/c1-2 Key: QPLDLSVMHZLSFG-PHEGLCPBAN; InChI=1/Cu.O/q+2;-2 Key: KKCXRELNMOYFLS-UHFFFAOYAT
- SMILES: [Cu]=O; [Cu+2].[O-2]

Properties
Chemical formula	CuO
Molar mass	79.545 g/mol
Appearance	black to brown powder
Density	6.315 g/cm^{3}
Melting point	1,326 °C (2,419 °F; 1,599 K)
Boiling point	2,000 °C (3,630 °F; 2,270 K)
Solubility in water	insoluble
Solubility	soluble in ammonium chloride, potassium cyanide insoluble in alcohol, ammonium carbonate
Band gap	1.2 eV
Magnetic susceptibility (χ)	+238.9·10^{−6} cm^{3}/mol
Refractive index (n_{D})	2.63

Structure
Crystal structure	monoclinic, mS8
Space group	C2/c, #15
Lattice constant	a = 4.6837, b = 3.4226, c = 5.1288 α = 90°, β = 99.54°, γ = 90°

Thermochemistry
Std molar entropy (S^{⦵}_{298})	43 J·mol^{−1}·K^{−1}
Std enthalpy of formation (Δ_{f}H^{⦵}_{298})	−156 kJ·mol^{−1}

Hazards
- GHS labelling
Pictograms	(GHS07: Exclamation mark) (GHS09: Environmental hazard)
Signal word	Warning
Hazard statements	H302, H410, H412
Precautionary statements	P264, P270, P273, P301+P317, P330, P391, P501
NFPA 704 (fire diamond)	2 0 1
Flash point	Non-flammable
- NIOSH (US health exposure limits)
PEL (Permissible)	TWA 1 mg/m^{3} (as Cu)
REL (Recommended)	TWA 1 mg/m^{3} (as Cu)
IDLH (Immediate danger)	TWA 100 mg/m^{3} (as Cu)
Safety data sheet (SDS)	Fisher Scientific

Related compounds
Other anions	Copper(II) sulfide
Other cations	Nickel(II) oxide Zinc oxide
Related compounds	Copper(I) oxide
- Except where otherwise noted, data are given for materials in their standard state (at 25 °C [77 °F], 100 kPa). verify (what is ?) Infobox references

Copper(II) oxide or cupric oxide is an inorganic compound with the formula CuO. A black solid, it is one of the two stable oxides of copper, the other being Cu_{2}O or copper(I) oxide (cuprous oxide). As a mineral, it is known as tenorite, or sometimes black copper. It is a product of copper mining and the precursor to many other copper-containing products and chemical compounds.

== Structure and physical properties ==
Copper(II) oxide belongs to the monoclinic crystal system. The copper atom is coordinated by 4 oxygen atoms in an approximately square planar configuration.

The work function of bulk CuO is 5.3 eV.

== Production ==
It is produced on a large scale by pyrometallurgy, as one stage in extracting copper from its ores. The ores are treated with an aqueous mixture of ammonium carbonate, ammonia, and oxygen to ultimately give copper(II) ammine complex carbonates, such as [Cu(NH_{3})_{4}]CO_{3}. After extraction from the residues and after separation from iron, lead, etc. impurities, the carbonate salt is decomposed with steam to give CuO.

It can be formed by heating copper in air at around 300–800 °C:

2 Cu + O_{2} → 2 CuO

For laboratory uses, copper(II) oxide is conveniently prepared by pyrolysis of copper(II) nitrate or basic copper(II) carbonate:

2 Cu(NO_{3})_{2} → 2 CuO + 4 NO_{2} + O_{2} (180°C)
Cu_{2}(OH)_{2}CO_{3} → 2 CuO + CO_{2} + H_{2}O

Dehydration of cupric hydroxide has also been demonstrated:

Cu(OH)_{2} → CuO + H_{2}O

Copper(II) oxide can also be produced, at industrial scales, by chemical precipitation of copper(II) sulfate (CuSO_{4}) with sodium hydroxide (NaOH) to form copper(II) hydroxide, which is then heated at around 250°C to produce CuO.

== Uses ==
As a significant product of copper mining, copper(II) oxide is the starting point for the production of many other copper salts. For example, many wood preservatives are produced from copper oxide.

Cupric oxide is used as a pigment in ceramics to produce blue, red, and green, and sometimes gray, pink, or black glazes.

It is incorrectly used as a dietary supplement in animal feed. Due to low bioactivity, negligible copper is absorbed.

It is used when welding with copper alloys.

A copper oxide electrode formed part of the early battery type known as the Edison–Lalande cell. Copper oxide was also used in a lithium battery type (IEC 60086 code "G").

=== Pyrotechnics and fireworks ===
Used as moderate blue coloring agent in blue flame compositions with additional chlorine donors and oxidizers such as chlorates and perchlorates. Providing oxygen it can be used as flash powder oxidizer with metal fuels such as magnesium, aluminium, or magnalium powder. Sometimes it is used in strobe effects and thermite compositions as crackling stars effect.

== Reactions ==
Copper(II) oxide reacts with mineral acids such as hydrochloric acid, sulfuric acid, and nitric acid to give the corresponding hydrated copper(II) salts:

CuO + 2 HNO_{3} → Cu(NO_{3})_{2} + H_{2}O
CuO + 2 HCl → CuCl_{2} + H_{2}O
CuO + H_{2}SO_{4} → CuSO_{4} + H_{2}O

In presence of water it reacts with concentrated alkali to form the corresponding cuprate salts:

2 NaOH + CuO + H_{2}O → Na_{2}[Cu(OH)_{4}]

It can also be reduced to copper metal using hydrogen, carbon monoxide, and carbon:

CuO + H_{2} → Cu + H_{2}O
CuO + CO → Cu + CO_{2}
2 CuO + C → 2Cu + CO_{2}

When cupric oxide is substituted for iron oxide in thermite the resulting mixture is a low explosive, not an incendiary.

== Similar compounds ==
An example of natural copper(I,II) oxide is the mineral paramelaconite, Cu^{+}_{2}Cu^{2+}_{2}O_{3}.

== See also ==
- Patina
- Tenorite
