= Thiostannate =

Class of chemical compounds

Sulfidostannates, or thiostannates are chemical compounds containing anions composed of tin linked with sulfur. They can be considered as stannates with sulfur substituting for oxygen. Related compounds include the thiosilicates, and thiogermanates, and by varying the chalcogen: selenostannates, and tellurostannates. Oxothiostannates have oxygen in addition to sulfur. Thiostannates can be classed as chalcogenidometalates, thiometallates, chalcogenidotetrelates, thiotetrelates, and chalcogenidostannates. Tin is almost always in the +4 oxidation state in thiostannates, although a couple of mixed sulfides in the +2 state are known,

Some thiostannate minerals are known. In nature the tin can be partly replaced by arsenic, germanium, antimony or indium. Many thiostannate minerals contain copper, silver or lead. In the field of mineralogy, these compound can be termed sulfostannates or sulphostannates.

Different cluster anions are known: [SnS_{4}]^{4–}, [SnS_{3}]^{2–}, [Sn_{2}S_{5}]^{2–}, [Sn_{2}S_{6}]^{4–}, [Sn_{2}S_{7}]^{6–}, [Sn_{2}S_{8}]^{2–}, [Sn_{3}S_{7}]^{2–}, [Sn_{4}S_{9}]^{2–}, [Sn_{5}S_{12}]^{4–}, or [Sn_{4}S_{10}]^{4–}.

The number of sulfur atoms coordinated around the tin atom is most commonly four. However there are also complexes with five or six sulfur atoms surrounding the tin. The behaviour for selenium and tellurium differs as only five selenium or four tellurium atoms can bind to a tin atom. The smaller germanium atom can only accommodate four sulfur atoms. For lead it is hard for it to be in the +4 oxidation state. The SnS_{n} polyhedrons can be standalone in strongly alkaline conditions, or at higher concentrations or less alkaline can condense together. Polyhedra shapes are tetrahedron for four, trigonal bipyramid for five, and octahedron for six sulfur atoms. The polyhedra can be connected at a vertex (corner), or at an edge. Where connected at an edge, four membered rings of -SnSSnS- with internal angles close to 90°. [Sn_{2}S_{7}]^{6–} is corner bridged. Tetrahedra linked by at the corner by a disulfur bridge are unknown.

Sn_{10}O_{4}S_{20}^{8-} is a supertetrahedron made from 1, 3 and 6 tin atoms connected by oxygen on the interior and sulfur on the surface.

For anions with formula Sn_{x}S_{y} the condensation ratio c is given by x/y. It can vary from 1/4 to just below 1/2.

== Synthesis ==
The first human production of a thiostannate heated tin oxide with sodium carbonate and sulfur:

2SnO_{2} + 2Na_{2}CO_{3} + 9S → 2Na_{2}SnS_{3} + 2CO_{2} + 3SO_{2}

Transition metal complexes may be prepared by crystallisation from the ligand solvent.

Copper(II) is normally reduced by sulfide S^{2-} in thiostannates to copper(I).

=== Anions ===
formula	name	coordination	dimensionality	description
[SnS_{4}]^{4−}		4	0	tetrahedra
[Sn_{2}S_{6}]^{4−}	bis(μ-sulfido)-tetrathiolato-di-tin	4	0	edge shared
[Sn_{3}S_{9}]^{6−}	1,3,5,2,4,6-trithiatristanninane-2,2,4,4,6,6-hexakis(thiolate)	4	0	6 membered ring
[Sn_{4}S_{10}]^{4-}		4	0	tetrameric adamantane-like : tetrahedron of tetrahedra, 6 bridging sulfur, 4 terminal sulfur

== Reactions ==
Some hydrates are unstable, where water reacts with the sulfide to make hydrogen sulfide gas.

== List ==
formula	system	space group	unit cell Å	volume	density	comment
Li_{4}SnS_{4}	orthorhombic	Pnma	a=13.812 b=7.962 c=6.370			
[Li_{8}(H_{2}O)_{29}][Sn_{10}O_{4}S_{20}]·2H_{2}O	triclinic	P1̅	a = 11.232, b = 13.097, c = 23.735, α = 102.73°, β = 90.43°, γ = 93.44°, Z = 2	3399		oxothiostannate
(NH_{4})_{4}Sn_{2}S_{6}·3H_{2}O	orthorhombic	P4_{1}2_{1}2	a =8.56294 b =8.56294 c= 22.7703			
(NH_{4})_{6}Sn_{3}S_{9}·1.3H_{2}O	monoclinic	C2	a 16.9872 b 10.54777 c 21.0871 β 108.0389°	3592.6	2.154	colourless
[(CH_{3})_{3}NH]_{2}Sn_{3}S_{7}						
[(CH_{3})_{4}N]_{2}Sn_{3}S_{7}·H_{2}O						
[(CH_{3})_{4}N]_{4}Sn_{4}S_{10}						
[(CH_{3}CH_{2})_{4}N]_{2}Sn_{3}S_{7}						
[(CH_{3}CH_{2}CH_{2})_{4}N]_{2}Sn_{4}S_{9}						
[(CH_{3}CH_{2}CH_{2}CH_{2})_{4}N]_{2}Sn_{4}S_{9}						
[(CH_{3}CH_{2}CH_{2})_{4}N][(CH_{3})_{3}NH]Sn_{4}S_{9}						
(C_{12}H_{25}NH_{3})_{4}Sn_{2}S_{6} ·2H_{2}O						
[dabcoH]_{2}Sn_{3}S_{7}						
(Et_{4}N)_{2}Sn(S_{4})_{3}						
(Et_{4}N)_{2}Sn(S_{4})_{2}(S_{6})						
((CH_{3}C(NH_{2})_{2})_{8}Sn_{2}S_{6}SnS_{4}	monoclinic	C 1 2/m 1	a=23.7739 b=16.0647 c=11.8936 β=99.029 Z=4	4486.1	1.702	colourless
((CH_{3})_{2}NH_{2})(NH_{4})SnS_{3} dimethylammonium ammonium	orthorhombic	P2_{1}2_{1}2_{1}	a=5.9393 b=12.1816 c=12.4709 Z=4	902.26	2.054	colourless
(DBNH)_{2}Sn_{3}S_{6} DBN=1,5-diazabicyclo[4.3.0]non-7-ene						Sn(II) and Sn(IV)
(1AEP)_{2}Sn_{3}S_{7} 1AEP = 1-(2-aminoethyl) piperidine	orthorhombic	P2_{1}2_{1}2_{1}	a=13.2299 b= 22.2673 c=9.0772 Z=4	2674.1		pale yellow
SnS_{2}·en	monoclinic	C2/c	a 15.317 b 10.443 c 12.754, β 93.62°			
[enH]_{4}[Sn_{2}S_{6}]·en	triclinic	P1̅	a 9.8770 b 9.9340 c 15.4230, α 72.630° β 86.220° γ 81.380°			
Na_{2}SnS_{3}		R3̅m	a=3.834 c=19.876 Z=2	253	3.43	
Na_{4}SnS_{4}	tetragonal	P4̅21c	a=7.837 c=6.950	427	2.64	
Na_{4}Sn_{2}S_{6}						
Na_{4}Sn_{2}S_{6}·14H_{2}O	triclinic	P1̅	a=10.114 b=7.027 c=9.801 α=108.30 β=92.18 γ=91.11 Z=1	663	1.95	
Na_{4}SnS_{4}·14H_{2}O	monoclinic	C2/c	a=8.622 b=23.534 c=11.347 β=110.53 Z=4	2156	1.82	
Na_{4}Sn_{3}S_{8}						
Na_{5}[SnS_{4}]Cl·13H_{2}O	monoclinic	P2_{1}/m	a=8.4335 b=11.4958 c=11.5609 β=91.066 Z=2	1120.63	1.872	
Na_{4}Sn_{2}S_{6}·5H_{2}O						
Na_{6}Sn_{2}S_{7}		C2/c	a=9.395 b=10.719 c=15.671 β=109.97 Z=4	1483	2.69	
Mg_{2}SnS_{4}	orthorhombic	Pnma	a=12.93 b=7.52 c=6.16 Z=4	599	3.28	
Na_{2}MgSnS_{4}		R3̅m	a 3.7496 b 3.7496 c 19.9130			
(Ph_{4}P)_{2}Sn(S_{4})_{3}						
K_{2}SnS_{3} ·2H_{2}O						
K_{2}SnS_{3}·2H_{2}O	orthorhombic	Pnma	a=6.429 b=15.621 c=10.569 Z=4	1061	2.06	
K_{2}Sn_{2}S_{5}						
K_{2}Sn_{3}S_{7} ·H_{2}O						
[K_{4}(H_{2}O)_{4}][SnS_{4}]						
Ca_{2}SnS_{4}	orthorhombic	Pnma	a=13.74 b=8.23 c=6.44 Z=4	728	2.99	
[H_{2}tepa][V^{III}(tepa)(μ-Sn_{2}Q_{6})]_{2}	orthorhombic	Abm2	a =7.7486 b =40.410 c =16.745			
Mn_{2}SnS_{4}	tetragonal	I4_{1}/a	a=7.408 c=10.41 Z=8	571	4.15	
[Mn(en)_{3}]_{2}[Sn_{2}S_{6}]	monoclinic	C2/c	a=15.138 b=10.6533 c=23.586 β=118.42 Z=4	3345.2	1.787	colourless
[Mn(en)_{3}]_{2}Sn_{2}S_{6}·2H_{2}O	monoclinic	P2_{1}/c	a=10.129, b=15.746, c=11.524, β=102.36° Z=2	1795.5	1.732	
[Mn(en)_{2}]_{2}(μ-en)[Sn_{2}S_{6}]	triclinic		a=9.0017 b=9.7735 c=10.8421 α=60.38° β=67.23° γ=70.25°	752.38		
[Mn(dien)_{2}]_{2}Sn_{2}S_{6}	monoclinic	P2_{1}/c	a=12.48 12, b= 9.3760, c=17.7617, β=121.752°, Z=2,	1767.5	1.789	
[Mn(tren)]_{2}Sn_{2}S_{6}	triclinic	P1̅	a 7.653 b 8.088 c 12.200, α 97.27° β 104.06° γ 108.80° Z=1	676.0	2.044	yellow
[Mn(tren)(H_{2}O)][Mn(baen)]_{3}Mn_{4}Sn_{6}S_{20}∙9H_{2}O	orthorhombic	P2_{1}3	a =21.404 b =21.404 c= 21.404			super tetrahedron
{Mn(tepa)}_{2}(μ-Sn_{2}S_{6})	tetragonal	I4_{1}/a	a=25.977 c=10.041 Z=8	6775	1.800	yellow
{[Mn(trien)]_{2}[SnS_{4}]}						
{[Mn(C_{6}H_{18}N_{4})]_{2}SnS_{4}}·4H_{2}O	monoclinic	P2_{1}/c	a 10.8446 b 20.974 c 13.2746 β 113.487°			
{[Mn(phen)_{2}]_{2}(μ_{2}-Sn_{2}S_{6})}	monoclinic	P2_{1}/n	a =10.8230 b=9.8940 c=24.811 β=91.356°			
{[Mn(phen)_{2}]_{2}(μ_{2}-Sn_{2}S_{6})}·phen	triclinic	P1̅	a=10.0642 b=10.6249 c=13.693, α=71.700° β=81.458° γ=84.346°			
{[Mn(phen)_{2}]_{2}[Sn_{2}S_{6}]}·phen·H_{2}O phen = 1,10-phenanthroline	triclinic	P1̅	a=11.3203 b=12.1436 c=12.7586, α=113.200° β=90.908° γ=110.974°			
[Mn(phen)]_{2}(SnS_{4})·H_{2}O	monoclinic	C2/m	a=16.146 b=19.262 c=9.938 β=124.970 Z=4	2532.6	1.928	red chain
{[Mn(phen)_{2}]_{2}[μ-η^{2}-η^{2}-SnS_{4}]_{2}[Mn(phen)]_{2}}·H_{2}O	triclinic	P1̅	a=10.8703 b=12.5183 c=14.9644, α=103.381° β=108.390° γ=101.636°			
{[Mn(2,2′-bipy)_{2}]_{2}[Sn_{2}S_{6}]}						
(1,4-dabH)_{2}MnSnS_{4} 1,4-dab = 1,4-diaminobutane	orthorhombic	Fdd2	a = 22.812, b = 24.789, c = 6.4153, Z = 8	3627.8		
Li_{4}MnSn_{2}Se_{7}	monoclinic	Cc	a=18.126 b=7.2209 c=10.740 β=93.43 Z=4	1403.2	4.132	orange
Fe_{2}SnS_{4}	tetragonal	I4_{1}/a	a=7.308 c=10.338 Z=4	552	4.32	
{[Fe(tepa)]_{2}[Sn_{2}S_{6}]}	tetragonal	I4_{1}/a				
{[Fe(1,2-dach)_{2}][Sn_{2}S_{6}]}·2(1,2-dachH)						
{[Fe(phen)_{2}]_{2}[Sn_{2}S_{6}]}·phen·H_{2}O						
[Co(en)_{3}]_{2}[Sn_{2}S_{6}]	orthorhombic	Pbca	a=15.640 b=11.564 c=18.742 Z=4	2289.7	1.779	yellow
[Co(dien)_{2}]_{2}[Sn_{2}S_{6}]						
[Co_{2}(cyclam)_{2}Sn_{2}S_{6}]·2H_{2}O						
[Co(tren)]_{2}Sn_{2}S_{6}	monoclinic	C2/c	a=12.228 b=9.7528 c=23.285 β=102.90	2706.8		
{[Co(cyclam)]_{2}[Sn_{2}S_{6}]}_{n}·2nH_{2}O cyclam = 1,4,8,11-tetraazacyclotetradecane						
{[Co(tepa)]_{2}[Sn_{2}S_{6}]} tepa=tetraethylenepentamine	tetragonal	I4_{1}/a	a=25.742 c=9.898	6558		
{[Co(phen)_{2}]_{2}[Sn_{2}S_{6}]}·phen·H_{2}O						
[Co(2-(aminomethyl)pyridine)_{3}]_{2}Sn_{2}S_{6}·10H_{2}O (2amp)	monoclinic	P2_{1}/c	a=10.1443 b=14.6124 c=18.8842 β=90.601° Z=2	2799.1	1.633	yellow
[Co(trans-1,2-diaminocyclohexane)_{3}]_{2}Sn_{2}S_{6}·8H_{2}O (dach)	monoclinic	P2_{1}/n	a=12.6521 b=11.7187 c=20.4386 β=91.262° Z=2	3029.6	1.509	red
Ni_{6}SnS_{2} Butianite	tetragonal	I4/mmm	a = 3.650, c = 18.141 Z=2	241.7	7.62	opaque
[Ni(en)_{3}]_{2}[Sn_{2}S_{6}]						
[Ni(dap)_{3}]_{2}[Sn_{2}S_{6}]·2H_{2}O dap=1,2-diaminopropane	triclinic	P1̅	a=9.9046 b=10.527 c=11.319 α =72.13° β =85.19° γ =63.63°	1004.5		
[Ni(1,2-dach)_{3}]_{2}[Sn_{2}S_{6}]·4H_{2}O 1,2-dach = 1,2-diaminocyclohexane						
[Ni(dien)_{2}]_{2}[Sn_{2}S_{6}]						
{[Ni(cyclen)]_{6}[Sn_{6}S_{12}O_{2}(OH)_{6}]}·2(ClO_{4})·19H_{2}O cyclen = 1,4,7,10-tetraazacyclododecane						
[Ni(cyclen)(H_{2}O)_{2}]_{4}[Sn_{10}S_{20}O_{4}]·~13H_{2}O						
{[Ni(cyclen)]_{6}[Sn_{6}S_{12}O_{2}(OH)_{6}]}·2(ClO_{4})·19H_{2}O	monoclinic	C2/c	a=25.7223 b=15.6522 c=29.070 β=105.879 Z=4	11257	1.863	oxothiostannate
[Ni(2amp)_{3}]_{2}[Sn_{2}S_{6}]·9.5H_{2}O 2amp = 2-(aminomethyl)pyridine	monoclinic	P2_{1}/n	a=18.7021 b=14.6141 c=20.2591 β=97.696 Z=4	5487.2	1.655	purple
[Ni(aepa)_{2}]_{2}[Sn_{2}S_{6}] aepa=N-2-aminoethyl-1,3-propandiamine						
[Ni(tren)]_{2}Sn_{2}S_{6}	monoclinic	C2/c	a=23.371 b=8.231 c=14.274 β =107.230 Z=4	2622.6	2.127	
[Ni(tren)_{2}]_{2}[Sn_{2}S_{6}]·8H_{2}O	orthorhombic	P4_{2}/n	a=26.1885 b=26.1885 c=11.1122			
[Ni(tren)(2amp)]_{2}[Sn_{2}S_{6}]	triclinic	P1̅	a =10.2878 b =11.1100 c =11.4206, α =84.740° β =84.395° γ =79.093°			
[Ni(tren)(2amp)]_{2}[Sn_{2}S_{6}]·10H_{2}O	monoclinic	P2_{1}/n	a =12.1933 b =13.4025 c =14.8920 β= 103.090°			
[Ni(tren)(en)]_{2}[Sn_{2}S_{6}]·2H_{2}O	monoclinic	P2_{1}/n	a 12.7041 b 9.8000 c 15.3989, β 108.843°			
[Ni(tren)(en)]_{2}[Sn_{2}S_{6}]·6H_{2}O	monoclinic	P2_{1}/n	a 12.5580 b 9.7089 c 16.0359, β 91.827°			
[Ni(tren)(1,2-dach)]_{2}[Sn_{2}S_{6}]·3H_{2}O	triclinic	P1̅	a 9.8121 b 10.0080 c 12.422, α 86.38° β 79.65° γ 65.72°			
[Ni(tren)(1,2-dach)]_{2}[Sn_{2}S_{6}]·4H_{2}O	monoclinic	P2_{1}/n	a 10.7119 b 19.0797 c 11.1005, β 104.803°			
{[Ni(cyclam)]_{2}[Sn_{2}S_{6}]}·2H_{2}O						
{[Ni(tepa)]_{2}[Sn_{2}S_{6}]}	monoclinic	P2_{1}/n				
{[Ni(phen)_{2}]_{2}[Sn_{2}S_{6}]}·2,2′-bipy	monoclinic	P2_{1}/n	a=10.5715 b=9.9086 c=24.9960 β=92.800 Z=2	2615.17	1.809	deep red
{[Ni(phen)_{2}]_{2}Sn_{2}S_{6}}·4,4′-bipy·½H_{2}O 4,4′-bipy = 4,4′-bipyridine	monoclinic	C2/c	a=18.3431 b=19.4475 c=15.0835 β=95.556 Z=4	5355.4	1.789	dark red-brown
{[Ni(phen)_{2}]_{2}[Sn_{2}S_{6}]}·phen·H_{2}O						
[Ni(L_{1})][Ni(L_{1})Sn_{2}S_{6}]_{n}·2H_{2}O L_{1} = 1,8-dimethyl-1,3,6,8,10,13-hexaazacyclotetradecane	monoclinic	P21/c				
[Ni(L_{2})]_{2}[Sn_{2}S_{6}]·4H_{2}O L_{2} = 1,8-diethyl-1,3,6,8,10,13-hexaazacyclotetradecane	triclinic	P1̅				
[Ni(tren)(ma)(H_{2}O)]_{2}[Sn_{2}S_{6}]·4H_{2}O ma = methylamine	monoclinic	P2_{1}/n	a=11.1715 b=10.5384 c=15.8594 Z=2	1827.45	1.835	
[Ni(tren)(1,2-dap)]_{2}[Sn_{2}S_{6}]·2H_{2}O	monoclinic	P2_{1}/n	a=12.9264 b=10.1627 c=15.6585 Z=2	1889.8	1.799	
[Ni(tren)(1,2-dap)]_{2}[Sn_{2}S_{6}]·4H_{2}O	monoclinic	C2/c	a =14.3925 b=15.1550 c=18.9307, β=99.108°			
[Ni(2amp)_{3}]_{2}[Sn_{2}S_{6}]·9.5H_{2}O 2amp = 2-(aminomethyl)pyridine	monoclinic	P2_{1}/n	a=18.7021 b=14.6141 c=20.2591 Z=4	5487.23	1.655	purple
Cu_{2}SnS_{3} Mohite	monoclinic		a=23.10 b=6.25 c=6.25 β=101.0°		4.69	greenish grey
Cu_{3}SnS_{4} Kuramite	tetragonal	I4̅2m	a = 5.445, c = 10.75, Z = 2	318.72	4.56	
Cu_{4}SnS_{4}	orthorhombic	Pnma	a=13.70 b=7.750 c=6.454 Z=4	685	4.96	
Cu_{4}SnS_{6} Erazoite	rhombohedral	R3m	a = 3.739, c = 32.941, Z = 2		4.53	black
Cu_{4}Sn_{7}S_{16}	monoclinic		a=12.75 b=7.34 c=12.71 β=109.5 Z=2	1121	4.74	
(DBUH)CuSnS_{3} DBU = 1,8-diazabicyclo[5.4.0]undec-7-ene	monoclinic	P2_{1}/n	a=9.254 b=8.6190 c=18.135, β=92.80°			
(1,4-dabH_{2})Cu_{2}SnS_{4} 1,4-dab = 1,4-diaminobutane	tetragonal	P4_{2}/n	a=14.539 c=11.478			
(enH)_{6}Cu_{40}Sn_{15}S_{60} en=ethylenediamine	cubic	Pn3̅n	a=25.260 Z=4	16119	2.727	black
(enH)_{3}Cu_{7}Sn_{4}S_{12}	trigonal	R3̅c	a=13.532 c=28.933 Z=6	4588	3.23	red
[H_{2}en]_{2}[Cu_{8}Sn_{3}S_{12}]						
(trenH_{3})Cu_{7}Sn_{4}S_{12} tren = tris(2-aminoethyl)amine)	trigonal	R3c	a=13.1059 c=29.347 Z=6	4365.4	3.317	
[dienH_{2}][Cu_{2}Sn_{2}S_{6}]						
[DBUH][CuSnS_{3}] DBU = 1,8-diazabicyclo[5.4.0]undec-7-ene						
[1,4-dabH_{2}][Cu_{2}SnS_{4}]						
{[Cu(cyclam)]_{2}[Sn_{2}S_{6}]}·2H_{2}O cyclam=1,4,8,11-tetraazacyclotetradecane	triclinic	P1̅	a=9.0580 b=9.9419 c=10.2352, α=97.068° β=94.314° γ=101.514°			
(DBNH)_{2}Cu_{6}Sn_{2}S_{8} DBN=1,5-diazabicyclo[4.3.0]non-7-ene						
[Co(2-(aminomethyl)pyridine)_{3}]_{2} Sn_{2}S_{6}·10H_{2}O	monoclinic	P2_{1}/c	a=10.1443 b=14.6124 c=18.8842 β=90.601° Z=2	2799.1	1.633	yellow; unstable
[Co(trans-1,2-diaminocyclohexane)_{3}]_{2}Sn_{2}S_{6}·8H_{2}O	monoclinic	P2_{1}/n	a=12.6521 b=11.7187 c=20.4386 β=91.262° Z=2	3029.6	1.509	red
Na_{4}Cu_{32}Sn_{12}S_{48}·4H_{2}O	cubic	Fm3̅c	a = 17.921 z = 13			black; absorption edge 2.0 eV
CuAlSnS_{4}	cubic		a=10.28 Z=8	1074	4.17	
K_{11}Cu_{32}Sn_{12}S_{48}·4H_{2}O	cubic	Fm3̅c	a = 18.0559 z = 14.75			black; absorption edge 1.9 eV
Cu_{2}MnSnS_{4}	tetragonal		a=5.49 c=10.72 Z=2	323	4.41	
Cu_{2}FeSnS_{4} Stannite Ferrokësterite	tetragonal	I4̅2m	a = 5.4432, c = 10.7299 Z=2	317.91		grey
Cu_{2}FeSn_{3}S_{8}	tetragonal	I4_{1}/a	a=7.29 c=10.31 Z=2	548	4.82	
Cu_{6}Fe_{2}SnS_{8} Mawsonite	Tetragonal	P4̅m2	a = 7.603, c = 5.358 Z=1	309	4.65	brownish orange
Cu_{6}FeSn_{2}S_{8} Chatkalite	Tetragonal	P4̅m2	a = 7.61, c = 5.373 Z=1	311.1	5.00	
Cu_{2}CoSnS_{4}	Tetragonal	I4̅2m	a=5.402 c=10.805 Z=2	315	4.56	
Cu_{2}NiSnS_{4}			a=5.425 Z=1	160	4.49	
Cu_{13}VSn_{3}S_{16} Nekrasovite	isometric		a=10.73	1,235		brown
[Zn(en)_{3}]_{2}[Sn_{2}S_{6}]	orthorhombic	Pbca	a=15.452 b=11.524 c=18.614 Z=4	3315.3	1.845	colourless
{Zn(tren)}_{2}(μ-Sn_{2}S_{6})	monoclinic	C2/c	a 12.214 b 9.726 c 23.209 β 102.732°	2689.3	2.107	light yellow
Cu_{2}ZnSnS_{4} Kësterite	tetragonal	I4̅	a = 5.427, c = 10.871 Z=2	320.18	4.55	greenish black
Cu_{6}^{+}Cu_{2}^{2+}(Fe^{2+},Zn)_{3}Sn_{2}S_{12} Stannoidite	orthorhombic		a = 10.76, b = 5.4, c = 16.09	934.9	4.68	brass
Cu_{3}(V,Ge,Sn)S_{4} Ge-Sn-Sulvanite				361		
SnGeS_{3} Stangersite	monoclinic	P2_{1}/b	a = 7.270, b = 10.197, c = 6.846 β = 105.34° Z=4	489	3.98	orange
Rb_{4}SnS_{4}						
Rb_{4}Sn_{2}S_{6}						
Rb_{2}Sn_{3}S_{7}·2H_{2}O						
Rb_{2}Cu_{2}SnS_{4}	orthorhombic	Ibam	a=5.528 b=11.418 c=13.700 Z=4	865	4.185	band gap 2.08 eV
Rb_{2}Cu_{2}Sn_{2}S_{6}	monoclinic	C2/c	a=11.026 b=11.019 c=20.299 β=97.79 Z=8	2444	3.956	band gap 1.44 eV
Rb_{2}ZnSn_{3}S_{8}						
[Rb_{4}(H_{2}O)_{4}][SnS_{4}]						
Sr_{3}MnSn_{2}S_{8}	cubic	I4̅3d	a = 14.2287 Z = 8	2880.7	3.743	dark green
Cu_{2}SrSnS_{4}	trigonal	P3_{1}	a = 6.29, c = 15.57 Z=3	534	4.31	
Sr_{6}Cu_{4}Sn_{4}S_{16}	cubic	I4̅3d	a=13.982	2734	4.295	yellow
Sr_{6}Cu_{2}FeSn_{4}S_{16}	cubic	I4̅3d	a=14.1349			band gap 1.53 eV
SrSnS_{3}	orthorhombic	Pnma	a=8.264 b=3.867 c=14.116 Z=4	451	4.45	
[Y_{2}(dien)_{4}(μ-OH)_{2}]Sn_{2}S_{6}	monoclinic	P2_{1}/n	a=11.854 b=11.449 c=13.803 β=97.978 Z=2	1855	1.888	light yellow
α-Ag_{8}SnS_{6}	cubic		a=21.43	9842		
β-Ag_{8}SnS_{6}	cubic		a=10.85	1277		
Ag_{8}SnS_{6} Canfieldite	orthorhombic		a = 15.298, b = 7.548, c = 10.699 Z=4	1,235.4	6.311	metallic
Na_{3}AgSnS_{4}	monoclinic	P2_{1}/c	a 8.109 b 6.483 c 15.941, α 90° β 103.713			double chain
AgCrSnS_{4}	cubic		a=10.74 Z=8	1239	4.92	
Ag_{2}MnSnS_{4} – Agmantinite	orthorhombic		a = 6.632, b = 6.922, c = 8.156 Z=2		4.574	orange
Ag_{2}ZnSnS_{4} Pirquitasite	tetragonal	I4̅	a = 5.78, c = 10.82	361		black
Ag_{2}(Fe^{2+},Zn)SnS_{4} Hocartite	tetragonal	I4̅2m	a = 5.74, c = 10.96 Z=2	361	4.77	brownish grey
Ag^{1+}(Fe^{2+}_{0.5}Sn^{4+}_{1.5})S_{4} Toyohaite	tetragonal					grey
[enH][Cu_{2}AgSnS_{4}]	orthorhombic	Pnma	a=19.7256 b=7.8544 c= 6.5083 Z=4	1008.3	3.577	red
Ag_{2}SrSnS_{4}	orthorhombic		a=7.127 b=8.117 c=6.854 Z=2	397	5.02	
Sr_{6}Ag_{4}Sn_{4}S_{16}	cubic	I4̅3d	a=14.2219 Z=4	2876.6	4.491	yellow
Sr_{6}Ag_{2}FeSn_{4}S_{16}	cubic	I4̅3d	a=14.2766			band gap 1.87 eV
[1,4-dabH_{2}][Ag_{2}SnS_{4}] 1,4-dab = 1,4-diaminobutane	tetragonal	P4_{2}/n	a = 14.7847, c = 11.9087, Z = 8	2603.1		
[H_{2}en][Ag_{2}SnS_{4}]						
[CH_{3}NH_{3}]_{2}Ag_{4}Sn^{IV}_{2}Sn^{II}S_{8}	orthorhombic	Pnma	a =19.378 b =7.390 c =13.683 Z=4	1959	3.756	Orange Sn(II)
[CH_{3}NH_{3}]_{6}Ag_{12}Sn_{6}S_{21}	monoclinic	P2_{1}/c	a =18.8646 b =19.9115 c =14.3125 β 100.117°			
[(Me)_{2}NH_{2}]_{3}[Ag_{5}Sn_{4}Se_{12}]	tetragonal	P4̅2_{1}m	a=13.998 c=8.685 Z=2	1701.9	4.403	dark red
[enH][Cu_{2}AgSnS_{4}]						
Cu_{2}CdSnS_{4}		I4̅2m	a=5.402 c=10.86 Z=2	338	4.77	
Ag_{2}CdSnS_{4}		Cmc2_{1}	a=4.111 b=7.038 c=6.685 Z=1	193	4.95	
Cu_{2}(Cd,Zn,Fe)SnS_{4} Černýite	tetragonal	I4̅2m	a = 5.48, c = 10.828 Z=4	326	4.76	metallic
CuInSnS_{4}			a=10.50 Z=8	1158	4.91	
AgInSnS_{4}			a=10.16 Z=8	1048	4.59	
(Cu,Fe,Zn,Ag)_{3}(Sn,In)S_{4} Petrukite	orthorhombic		a = 7.66, b = 6.43, c = 6.26	308		brown
(Cu,Zn,Fe)_{3}(In,Sn)S_{4} Sakuraiite	isometric		a = 5.46 Z=1	162		greenish grey
Sn_{2}S_{3}	orthorhombic	Pnma	a=8.864 b=3.7471 c=14.020 Z=4	466	4.76	
Cs_{4}SnS_{4}						0d
Cs_{2}Sn_{3}S_{7} ·0.5S_{8}						2d
Cs_{4}Sn_{5}S_{12}·2H_{2}O						2d
[Cs_{4}(H_{2}O)_{3}][SnS_{4}]						
Cs_{2}Sn(S_{4})_{2}(S_{6})						
Cs_{8}Sn_{10}O_{4}S_{20}·13H_{2}O						
[Cs_{10}(H_{2}O)_{18}][Mn_{4}(μ_{4}-S)(SnS_{4})_{4}]						
Cs_{2}ZnSn_{3}S_{8}	monoclinic	P2_{1}/n	a 7.5366 b 17.6947 c 12.4976, β=94.830° Z=4	1660.7	3.775	layered, band gap 3. eV
[Ba_{2}(H_{2}O)_{11}][SnS_{4}]						
Li_{2}Ba_{6}MnSn_{4}S_{16}	cubic	I4̅3d	a=14.6080 Z=4	3117.3	4.007	light yellow
Ag_{2}Ba_{6}MnSn_{4}S_{16}	cubic	I4̅3d	a=14.7064 Z=4	3180.7	4.349	yellow
Ag_{2}BaSnS_{4}	orthorhombic	I222	a =7.127 b =8.117 c =6.854 Z=2			black
Ba_{3}Ag_{2}Sn_{2}S_{8}						
BaSnS_{2}						Sn(II)
BaSn_{2}S_{3}						Sn(II)
BaSnS_{3}	orthorhombic	Pnma	a=8.527 b=3.933 c=14.515 Z=4	487	4.8	
BaSnS_{3}	monoclinic	C2/c Cc	a=24.49 b=6.354 c=23.09 β=90.15 Z=28	3593	4.55	
α-Ba_{2}SnS_{4}	monoclinic	P2_{1}/c	a=8.481 b=8.526 c=12.280 β=112.97 Z=4	818	4.24	
β-Ba_{2}SnS_{4}	orthorhombic	Pnma	a=17.823 b=7.359 c=12.613	1654	4.18	
Ba_{3}Sn_{2}S_{7}	monoclinic	P2_{1}/c	a=11.073 b=6.771 c=18.703 β=100.77 Z=4	1378	4.21	
K_{2}BaSnS_{4}		R3c	a 25.419 c 7.497			band gap 3.09 eV; SHG 0.5×AgGaS_{2}
Ba_{6}Cu_{2}FeSn_{4}S_{16}	cubic	I4̅3d	a=14.5260			band gap 1.2 eV
Ba_{6}Cu_{2}NiSn_{4}S_{16}	cubic	I4̅3d	a=14.511			band gap 0.82 eV
Ba_{6}Li_{2}ZnSn_{4}S_{16}	cubic	I4̅3d	a=14.5924			
Ba_{6}Ag_{2}ZnSn_{4}S_{16}	cubic	I4̅3d	a=14.6839			
BaCdSnS_{4}	orthorhombic	Fdd2	a=21.57 b=21.76 c=13.110 Z=32	6152	4.290	yellow
Ba_{3}CdSn_{2}S_{8}	cubic	I4̅3d	a=14.723			
Ba_{6}CdAg_{2}Sn_{4}S_{16}	cubic	I4̅3d	a=14.725			
La_{2}SnS_{5}	orthorhombic	Pbam	a=11.22 b=7.915 c=3.97 Z=2	352	5.26	
[La(dien)_{3}]_{2}[Sn_{2}S_{6}]Cl_{2}						band gap 3.25 eV
La(peha)(μ–SnS_{4}H) peha=pentaethylenehexamine	triclinic	P1̅	a 8.609 b 9.327 c 14.649, α 79.2° β 85.5° γ 63.74°			
BaCeSn_{2}S_{6}	orthorhombic	Pmc2_{1}	a 4.0665 b 19.859 c 11.873			
BaPrSn_{2}S_{6}	orthorhombic	Pmc2_{1}	a 4.0478 b 19.8914 c 11.9303			
BaNdSn_{2}S_{6}	orthorhombic	Pmc2_{1}	a 4.0098 b 19.761 c 11.841			
[Nd_{2}(en)_{6}(μ_{2}-OH)_{2}]Sn_{2}S_{6}	monoclinic	P2_{1}/n	a =10.176, b =11.387, c=15.018, β =97.869°			
Nd(peha)(μ–SnS_{4}H)	triclinic	P1̅	a 8.621 b 9.372 c 14.656, α 78.28° β 84.33° γ 63.32°			
{Nd(tepa)(μ–OH)}_{2}(μ–Sn_{2}S_{6})]·H_{2}O tepa=tetraethylenepentamine	monoclinic	C2/c	a=21.537 b=12.863 c=17.697 β=124.308°			
[Nd(dien)_{3}]_{2}[(Sn_{2}S_{6})Cl_{2}] dien = diethylenetriamine	monoclinic	P2_{1}/n	a = 11.672, b = 15.119, c = 14.157, β = 96.213°, Z = 4	2483.6		
[Nd(dien)_{3}]_{2}[(Sn_{2}S_{6})(SH)_{2}]	monoclinic	P2_{1}/n	a = 11.719, b = 15.217, c = 14.221, β = 95.775°, Z = 4	2523.1		
(tetaH)_{2}[Eu_{2}(teta)_{2}(tren)_{2}(μ-Sn_{2}S_{6})]Sn_{2}S_{6}	triclinic	P1̅	a=9.886 b=10.371 c=17.442 α=89.78 β=88.00 γ=85.14 Z=1	1780.8	1.898	light yellow
[Eu_{2}(tepa)_{2}(μ-OH)_{2}(μ-Sn_{2}S_{6})](tepa)_{0.5}·H_{2}O tepa = tetraethylene-pentamine	monoclinic	C2/c	a=19.803 b=14.998 c=17.800 β=126.57 Z=4	4246	1.970	colourless
[{Eu(en)_{3}}_{2}(μ-OH)_{2}]Sn_{2}S_{6}	monoclinic	P2_{1}/n	a = 10.116, b = 11.379, c = 14.949, β = 98.209°, Z=2	1703.1		
[{Eu(en)_{3}}_{2}(μ-OH)_{2}]Sn_{2}Se_{6}	monoclinic	P2_{1}/n	a = 10.136, b = 11.771, c = 15.423, β = 99.322°, Z = 2	1815.8		
[Eu(dien)_{3}]_{2}[(Sn_{2}S_{6})(SH)_{2}]	monoclinic	P2_{1}/n	a = 11.656, b = 15.168, c = 14.173, β = 95.682°, Z = 2	2493.4		
(tetaH)_{2}[Sm_{2}(teta)_{2}(tren)_{2}(μ-Sn_{2}S_{6})]Sn_{2}S_{6}	triclinic	P1̅	a=9.920 b=10.382 c=17.520 α=89.91 β=88.07 γ=85.23 Z=1	1797.1	1.877	light yellow
{Sm(tepa)(μ–OH)}_{2}(μ–Sn_{2}S_{6})]·H_{2}O	monoclinic	C2/c	a 21.487 b 12.8199 c 17.716 β 124.675°			
[Sm_{2}(en)_{6}(μ _{2}-OH)_{2}]Sn_{2}S_{6}	monoclinic	P2_{1}/n	a 10.129 b 11.377 c 14.962, β 98.128°			
[Sm(dien)_{3}]_{2}[(Sn_{2}S_{6})Cl_{2}]	monoclinic	P2_{1}/n	a 11.631 b 15.091 c 14.1420 β 96.202°			
[Sm(dien)_{3}]_{2}[(Sn_{2}S_{6})(SH)_{2}]	monoclinic	P2_{1}/n	a 11.698 b 15.212 c 14.219, β 95.654°			
[Sm(trien)(tren)(Cl)]_{2}Sn_{2}S_{6} · en	triclinic	P1̅	a 10.320 b 10.491 c 13.791, α 100.524° β 91.930° γ 119.083°			
{Gd(tepa)(μ–OH)}_{2}(μ–Sn_{2}S_{6})]·H_{2}O	monoclinic	C2/c	a 21.455 b 12.804 c 17.735 β 124.81°			
[Gd_{2}(en)_{6}(μ_{2}-OH)_{2}]Sn_{2}S_{6}	monoclinic	P2_{1}/n	a =10.1053 b =11.357 c =14.924, β = 98.346°			
[Gd(dien)_{3}]_{2}[(Sn_{2}S_{6})Cl_{2}] dien = diethylenetriamine	monoclinic	P2_{1}/n	a =11.662, b =15.168. c 14.185, β =95.696°			
{Dy(tepa)(μ–OH)}_{2}(μ–Sn_{2}S_{6})]·H_{2}O	monoclinic	C2/c	a 21.363 b 12.717 c 17.654 β 124.915°			
[Hen]_{2}[La(en)_{4}(CuSn_{3}S_{9})]⋅0.5 en						
[Hen]_{2}[Ce(en)_{4}(CuSn_{3}S_{9})]⋅0.5 en						
[Hen]_{4}[Nd(en)_{4}]_{2}[Cu_{6}Sn_{6}S_{20}]⋅3 en						
[enH]_{4}[Sm(en)_{4}]_{2}[Cu_{6}Sn_{6}S_{20}]·3en	monoclinic	C2/m	a 14.257 b 24.242 c 13.119 β 92.223°			
[Hen]_{4}[Gd(en)_{4}]_{2}[Cu_{6}Sn_{6}S_{20}]⋅3 en						
[enH]_{4}[Ho(en)_{4}]_{2}[Cu_{6}Sn_{6}S_{20}]·3en	monoclinic	C2/m	a 14.3859 b 24.361 c 13.175, β 93.526°			
EuCu_{2}SnS_{4}	orthorhombic	Ama2	a=10.4793, b=10.3610, c=6.4015, Z=4			
[Hen]_{4}[Er(en)_{4}]_{2}[Cu_{6}Sn_{6}S_{20}]⋅3 en						
[Hen]_{4}[Er(en)_{4}]_{2}[Ag_{6}Sn_{6}S_{20}]·3en	monoclinic	C2/m	a 14.557 b 24.397 c 13.412 β 94.42°			
[Hen]_{4}[Tm(en)_{4}]_{2}[Ag_{6}Sn_{6}S_{20}]·3en	monoclinic	C2/m	a 14.517 b 24.380 c 13.422 β 94.46°			
[Hen]_{4}[Yb(en)_{4}]_{2}[Ag_{6}Sn_{6}S_{20}]·3en	monoclinic	C2/m	a 14.536 b 24.397 c 13.397, β 94.63°			
Cu_{6}SnWS_{8} Kiddcreekite	isometric	F4̅3m	a = 10.8178 Z=4	1265.9	4.934	grey
PtSnS Bowlesite	orthorhombic	Pca2_{1}	a = 6.12 Å, b = 6.12 Å, c = 6.10 Å Z=4	228.47	10.06	metallic
(Pd,Pt)_{5}(Cu,Fe)_{4}SnTe_{2}S_{2} Oulankaite	tetragonal		a = 9.044, c = 4.937 Z=2	403.8	10.27	metallic
K_{2}Au_{2}SnS_{4}	triclinic	P1̅	a=8.212 b=11.019 c=7.314 α=97.82° β=111.72° γ=72.00° Z=2	483.2	4.941	band gap 2.75 eV
K_{2}Au_{2}Sn_{2}S_{6}	tetragonal	P4/mmc	a=7.968 c=19.200 Z=4	1219	4.914	band gap 2.30 eV
Cs_{2}Au_{2}SnS_{4}	orthorhombic	Fddd	a = 6.143 b = 14.296 c = 24.578 Z = 4	2158.4		
Ba[Au_{2}SnS_{4}]	orthorhombic	C222_{1}	a=6.6387 b=11.0605 c=10.9676 Z=1	805.32	6.418	red; blue-green luminescent
K_{2}Hg_{3}Sn_{2}S_{8}						
Cu_{2}HgSnS_{4} Velikite	tetrahedral	I4̅2m	a = 5.55, c = 10.91	336	5.450	dark grey
SrHgSnSe_{4}						
BaHgSnSe_{4}	orthorhombic	Fdd2	a 22.441 b 22.760 c 13.579			
EuHgSnS_{4}		Ama2	a=10.3730 b=10.4380 c=6.5680			SHG 1.77×AgGaS_{2}
Tl_{4}SnS_{4}						0d
Tl_{2}SnS_{3}						1d
Tl_{2}Sn_{2}S_{5}						3d
Tl_{4}Sn_{5}S_{12}						3d
PbSnS_{2} Teallite	orthorhombic	Pnma	a = 4.26, b = 11.41, c = 4.09	198.8	6.36	metallic
PbSnS_{3} Suredaite	orthorhombic	Pnma	a=8.738 b=3.792 c=14.052 Z=4	466	6.01	metallic
(Pb,Sn)_{12.5}Sn_{5}FeAs_{3}S_{28} Coiraite	monoclinic		a = 5.84, b = 5.86, c = 17.32 β = 94.14° Z=4	591	5.92	dark grey
Fe^{2+}(Pb,Sn^{2+})_{6}Sn^{4+}_{2}Sb_{2}S_{14} Franckeite	triclinic	P1̅	a = 46.9, b = 5.82, c = 17.3 α = 90°, β = 94.66°, γ = 90° Z=8	4701	5.90	black
Pb_{25.7}Sn_{8.3}Mn_{3.4}Sb_{6.4}S_{56.2} Ramosite	monoclinic		a = 5.82, b = 5.92, c = 17.65 β = 99.1°	600		
Pb_{3}Sn_{4}FeSb_{2}S_{14} Cylindrite	triclinic	P1̅			5.46	black
Pb_{6}Sn_{3}FeSb_{3}S_{16} Potosíite	triclinic					grey
(Pb,Ag)_{4}Sn_{4}FeSb_{2}S_{15} Incaite	monoclinic					
Pb_{2}Fe_{2}Sn_{2}Sb_{2}S_{11} Plumbostannite						dark grey
Ba_{5}Pb_{2}Sn_{3}S_{13}	orthorhombic	Pnma				
Pb_{2}SnInBiS_{7} Abramovite	triclinic	P1̅	a = 23.4, b = 5.77, c = 5.83 α = 89.1°, β = 89.9°, γ = 91.5°	786.79		metallic
Pb_{8}Sn_{7}Cu_{3}(Bi,Sb)_{3}S_{28} Lévyclaudite	triclinic	P1̅			5.71	grey
