= Chatkalite =

Mineral

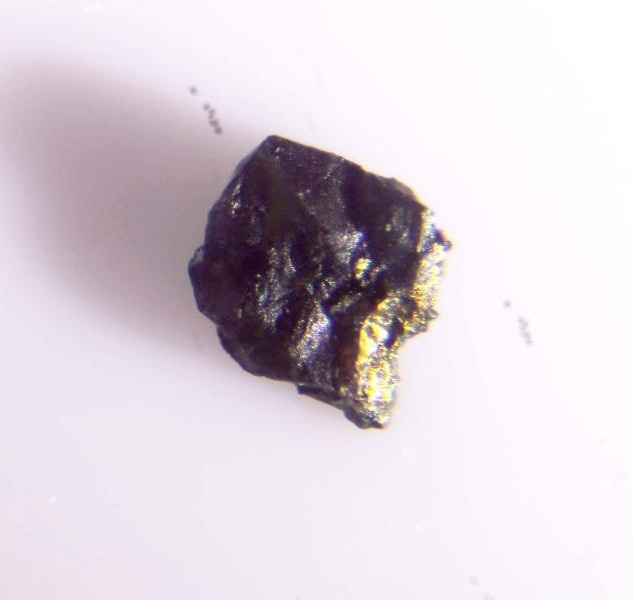
- Image of a Chatkalite

General
- Category: Sulfide mineral
- Formula: Cu_{6}Fe^{2+}Sn_{2}S_{8}
- IMA symbol: Ctk
- Strunz classification: 2.CB.20
- Crystal system: Tetragonal
- Crystal class: Scalenohedral (4̅2m); H-M symbol: (4̅ 2m)
- Space group: P4̅m2
- Unit cell: a = 7.61(1) Å, c = 5.373(5) Å; Z = 1

Identification
- Color: Rose to brown orange; Pale rose in reflected light
- Crystal habit: Rounded grains, to 100 μm within tetrahedrite
- Mohs scale hardness: 4.5
- Diaphaneity: Opaque
- Specific gravity: 5.00 (calculated)

Chatkalite is a copper, iron, tin sulfide mineral with formula Cu_{6}Fe^{2+}Sn_{2}S_{8}. It crystallizes in the tetragonal crystal system and forms as rounded disseminations within tetrahedrite in quartz veins.

== Physical properties ==
Chatkalite can have sizes ranging from rounded grains of about 100 micron when found within a tetrahedrite. It has a metallic luster, a hardness of 274 on the Vickers scale and a hardness of 4.5 on the Mohs scale. It has a color of pale rose in reflected light with no internal reflection. Its diaphaneity can be described as opaque. It does not exhibit any cleavage or twinning properties. Chatkalite is anisotropic which is characteristic of the stannite group. Its anisotropic intensity is a weak shade of brown.

== Occurrences ==
Chatkalite was first located in the sulfide bearing quartz veins of the Chatkal-Kuramin Mountains in eastern Uzbekistan in 1981. Chatkalite has also been located in few other places since then namely Ubertad Mine, Quirulvica Province of Santiago de Chuco, Peru, Mine McCoy, McCoy district, Lander County, Nevada US and Eugenia Maria Vein, Cerro Shortcut, Catamarca, Argentina. A few other minerals are also closely associated to chatkalite based on locality, these are cassiterite, hermisite and hessite.

== Unique characteristics ==
One of the rare characteristic of chatkalite is the fact that it has quaternary Bravais lattice metric singularity along with mawsonite. This means that there are four different lattices with three different symmetries that are all consistent with the same set of d spacings. The mineral chatkalite and mawsonite are considered highly specialized because they can produce cubic I tetragonal P, orthorhombic F, and orthorhombic P lattices.

== Etymology ==
Chatkalite was discovered in 1981 around the Chatkal Mountains of Uzbekistan in an unknown locality. It was given the name chatkalite because of this region where it was discovered.
