= CZTS =

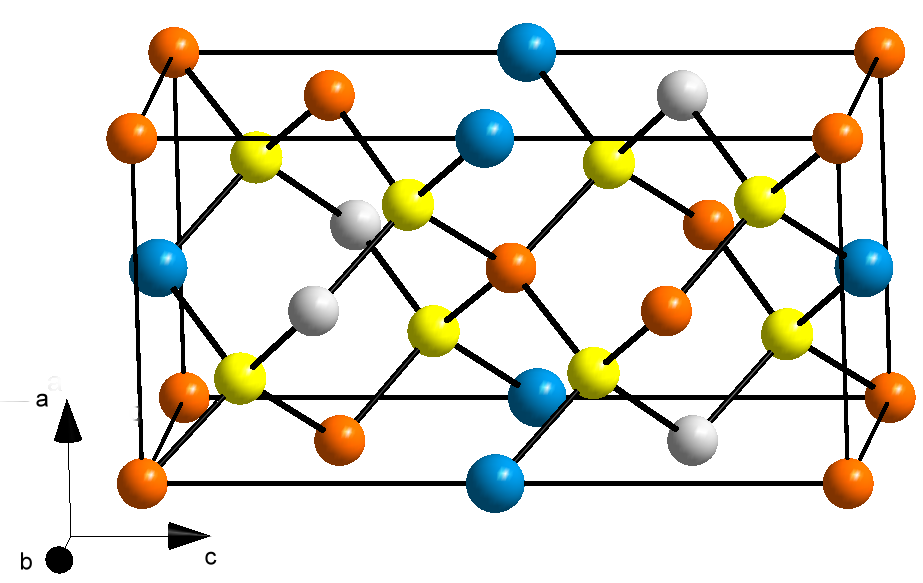
- CZTS crystal structure. Orange: Cu, grey: Zn/Fe, blue: Sn, yellow: S.

Names
- Other names copper zinc tin sulfide

Identifiers
CAS Number	12158-89-3
3D model (JSmol)	Interactive image
- InChI: InChI=1S/2Cu.4S.Sn.Zn/q2*+1;4*-1;;+2 Key: UPIPCFHYIQGPQH-UHFFFAOYSA-N
- SMILES: [Cu+].[Cu+].[Zn+2].[S-][Sn]([S-])([S-])[S-]

Properties
Chemical formula	Cu_{2}ZnSnS_{4}
Molar mass	439.471 g/mol
Appearance	Greenish black crystals
Density	4.56 g/cm^{3}
Melting point	990 °C (1,810 °F; 1,260 K)
Band gap	1.4–1.5 eV

Structure
Crystal structure	Tetragonal
Lattice constant	a = 0.5435 nm, c = 1.0843 nm, Z = 2
- Except where otherwise noted, data are given for materials in their standard state (at 25 °C [77 °F], 100 kPa). Infobox references

Copper zinc tin sulfide (CZTS) is a quaternary semiconducting compound which has received increasing interest since the late 2000s for applications in thin film solar cells. The class of related materials includes other I_{2}-II-IV-VI_{4} such as copper zinc tin selenide (CZTSe) and the sulfur-selenium alloy CZTSSe. CZTS offers favorable optical and electronic properties similar to CIGS (copper indium gallium selenide), making it well suited for use as a thin-film solar cell absorber layer, but unlike CIGS (or other thin films such as CdTe), CZTS is composed of only abundant and non-toxic elements. Concerns with the price and availability of indium in CIGS and tellurium in CdTe, as well as toxicity of cadmium have been a large motivator to search for alternative thin film solar cell materials. The power conversion efficiency of CZTS is still considerably lower than CIGS and CdTe, with laboratory cell records of 11.0 % for CZTS and 12.6 % for CZTSSe as of 2019.

== Crystal structure ==
CZTS is a I_{2}-II-IV-VI_{4} quaternary compound. From the chalcopyrite CIGS structure, one can obtain CZTS by substituting the trivalent In/Ga with a bivalent Zn and IV-valent Sn which forms in the kesterite structure.

Some literature reports have identified CZTS in the related stannite structure, but conditions under which a stannite structure may occur are not yet clear. First-principle calculations show that the crystal energy is only 2.86 meV/atom higher for the stannite than kesterite structure suggesting that both forms can coexist. Structural determination (via techniques like X-ray diffraction) is hindered by disorder of the Cu-Zn cations, which are the most common defect as predicted by theoretical calculations and confirmed by neutron scattering. The near random ordering of Cu and Zn may lead to misidentification of the structure. Theoretical calculations predict the disorder of the Cu-Zn cations to lead to potential fluctuations in the CZTS and could therefore the cause for the large open circuit voltage deficit, the main bottle neck of state-of-the-art CZTS devices. The disorder can be reduced by temperature treatments. However, other temperature treatments alone do not seem to be able to yield highly ordered CZTS. Other strategies need to be developed to reduce this defect, such as tuning of the CZTS composition.

== Material properties ==
Carrier concentrations and absorption coefficient of CZTS are similar to CIGS. Other properties such as carrier lifetime (and related diffusion length) are low (below 9 ns) for CZTS. This low carrier lifetime may be due to high density of active defects or recombination at grain boundaries. Defect formation in CZTS is prevalent due to low defect formation energies of zinc-copper antisite defects and copper vacancies. These defects create 'effective' charge in the crystal structure, which is stabilized by the aggregation of different defects that compensate for the charge disparity to become effectively neutral. As a result, electron-trapping states are formed, which enables recombination. Having deep-level defect states lowers the open-circuit voltage and the conversion efficiency of a CZTS solar cell.

Many secondary phases are possible in quaternary compounds like CZTS and their presence can affect the solar cell performance. Secondary phases can provide shunting current paths through the solar cell or act as recombination centers, both degrading solar cell performance. From the literature it appears that all secondary phases have a detrimental effect on CZTS performance, and many of them are both hard to detect and commonly present. Common phases include ZnS, SnS, CuS, and Cu_{2}SnS_{3}. Identification of these phases is challenging by traditional methods like X-ray diffraction (XRD) due to the peak overlap of ZnS and Cu_{2}SnS_{3} with CZTS. Some impurities such as ZnS and Cu_{8}GeS_{6} can be selectively removed from the CZTS or CZGS by treatment with hot diluted HCl. Polymorphism could be another source of defects in CZTS. Band gap of different polymorphs have been found to range from 1.12 to 1.45 eV. Other methods like Raman scattering are being explored to help characterize CZTS polymorphs.

== Fabrication ==
CZTS has been prepared by a variety of vacuum and non-vacuum techniques. They mostly mirror what has been successful with CIGS, although the optimal fabrication conditions may differ. Methods can be broadly categorized as vacuum deposition vs. non-vacuum and single-step vs. sulfidation and selenidation reaction methods. Vacuum-based methods are dominant in the current CIGS industry, but in the past decade there has been increasing interest and progress in non-vacuum processes owing to their potential lower capital costs and flexibility to coat large areas.

The record-holding CZTS solar cells is made by spin coating a hydrazine-based slurry. Due to its reducing character, hydrazine can stabilize sulfide and selenide anions in solution without adding impurities into the mix. To prevent defect formation, copper-poor and zinc-rich solutions were used.

A particular challenge for fabrication of CZTS and related alloys is the volatility of certain elements (Zn and SnS) which can evaporate under reaction conditions. Once CZTS is formed, element volatility is less of a problem but even then CZTS will decompose into binary and ternary compounds in vacuum at temperatures above 500 °C. This volatility and difficulty of preparing a single-phase material has resulted in the success of many traditional vacuum methods. Currently the best CZTS devices have been achieved through certain chemical methods which allow CZTS formation at low temperatures avoiding volatility problems.

A continuous flow process using ethylene glycol as a solvent has been developed at Oregon State University which may be suitable for industrial scale mass production.

== Motivation for development ==
CIGS and CdTe are two of the most promising thin-film solar cells and have recently seen growing commercial success. Despite continued rapid cost reduction, concerns about material price and availability as well as toxicity have been raised. Although current material costs are a small portion of the total solar cell cost, continued rapid growth of thin-film solar cells could lead to increased material price and limited supply.

For CIGS, indium has been subject to growing demand because of the rapid expansion of indium tin oxide (ITO) used in flat screen displays and mobile devices. The demand coupled with limited supply helped prices quickly climb to over $1000/kg before the global recession. While processing and capital equipment make up the majority of the costs for producing a CIGS solar cells, the price of the raw material is the lower bound for future costs and could be a limiting factor in decades ahead if demand continues to increase with limited supply. Indium exists mostly in low concentration ore deposits and is therefore obtained mainly as a byproduct of zinc mining. Growth projections based on many assumptions suggest that indium supply could limit CIGS production to the range of 17–106 GW/yr in 2050. Tellurium is even scarcer than indium, although demand has also been historically lower. Tellurium abundance in the Earth's crust is similar to that of gold, and projections of future availability range from 19 to 149 GW/yr in 2050.

CZTS (Cu_{2}ZnSnS_{4}) offers to alleviate the material bottlenecks present in CIGS (and CdTe). CZTS is similar to the chalcopyrite structure of CIGS but uses only earth-abundant elements. Raw materials are about five times cheaper than those for CIGS, and estimates of global material reserves (for Cu, Sn, Zn and S) suggest we could produce enough energy to power the world with only 0.1% of the available raw material resources. In addition, CZTS is non-toxic, unlike CdTe and to a lesser extent CIGS (although selenium is sometimes alloyed with CZTS and CdS is sometimes used as the n-type junction partner). In addition to these economical and environmental benefits, CZTS exhibits much greater radiation hardness than other photovoltaic materials, making it an excellent candidate for use in space.

== Development of solar cells ==
CZTS was first created in 1966 and was later shown to exhibit the photovoltaic effect in 1988. CZTS solar cells with efficiency up to 2.3% were reported in 1997, as well as CZTSe devices. The solar cell efficiency in CZTS was increased to 5.7% in 2005 by optimizing the deposition process. Recently, a 3.4% bifacial device, using In substituted CZTS (CZTIS) absorber material and transparent conducting back contact was reported in 2014, which can produce photocurrent on either side of illumination; later, the device efficiency based on this bifacial configuration has been boosted to 5.8% in 2016. Additionally, it has been demonstrated that sodium has an enhancing effect on the structural and electrical properties of CZTS absorber layers. These improvements, alongside the beginnings of CIGS production on a commercial scale in the mid-2000s catalyzed research interest in CZTS and related compounds.

Since 1988 CZTS was considered as an alternative to CIGS for commercial solar cell systems. The advantage of CZTS is the lack of the relatively rare and expensive element indium. The British Geological Survey Risk List 2011 gave indium a "relative supply risk index" of 6.5, where the maximum was 8.5.

In 2010, a solar energy conversion efficiency of about 10% was achieved in a CZTS device. CZTS technology is now being developed by several private companies. In August 2012, IBM announced they had developed CZTS solar cell capable of converting 11.1% of solar energy to electricity.

In 2013 Rajeshmon et al. reported an efficiency of 1.85% on spray pyrolysed CZTS/In_{2}S_{3} solar cell.

In November 2013, the Japanese thin-film solar company Solar Frontier announced that in joint research with IBM and Tokyo Ohka Kogyo (TOK), they had developed a world-record setting CZTSSe solar cell with a 12.6% energy conversion efficiency.

In 2018, CZTS nanoparticles were used as a hole transport layer for perovskite solar cells as a method to increase device stability and affordability, yielding a reported conversion efficiency of 9.66%.
