= Kuramite =

Mineral of the stannite group

General
- Category: Sulfide
- Formula: Cu_{3}SnS_{2}
- Crystal system: Tetragonal

Identification
- Color: Grey, Steel Grey
- Crystal habit: Inclusions, Microscopic crystals
- Mohs scale hardness: 5
- Luster: Metallic
- Streak: Metallic
- Density: 4.56g/cm3

Kuramite is a mineral of the stannite group. It is named after the Kochbulak Au-Ag-Te deposit locality in the Chatkal-Kuraminskii Mountains in Uzbekistan, where it was first discovered.

== Occurrence ==
Kuramite occurs in gold-sulfide-quartz veins as inclusions in goldfieldite, as observed in the Kochbulak deposit in Uzbekistan. It may also occur as microscopic crystals.

Kuramite has also been found in the Arctic Ocean, Argentina, Chile, DR Congo, Greece, Hungary, Japan, United Kingdom, and USA.

== Physical properties ==
Kuramite's hardness on the Mohs scale is 5, and it has a density of 4.56. It is an opaque steel grey color with a metallic luster and a metallic streak.

== Chemical properties ==
The chemical formula of Kuramite is Cu_{3}SnS_{4} with common impurities being iron, zinc and indium (Fe, Zn, and In).

Composition
Copper	43.56%
Tin	27.13%
Sulfur	29.31%

== X-ray powder pattern ==
X-ray study of Kuramite was done using the powder method, in the mineralogical laboratory of IGEM, Academy of Sciences of the USSR, by G. V. Vasova (RKO-57.3, unfiltered FeK). Kuramite was found to relate to the stannite-kesterite group. The parameters of the unit cell are found to be a=5.445±0.005 Å, c=10.75±0.02 Å, c/a=1.972.

Powder diffraction data
d-spacing	Intensity
3.13 Å	(10)
1.914 Å	(8)
1.640 Å	(6)
1.108 Å	(4)
1.244 Å	(3)
2.70 Å	(2)
1.044 Å	(2)

== See also ==
- List of minerals
