= Abramovite =

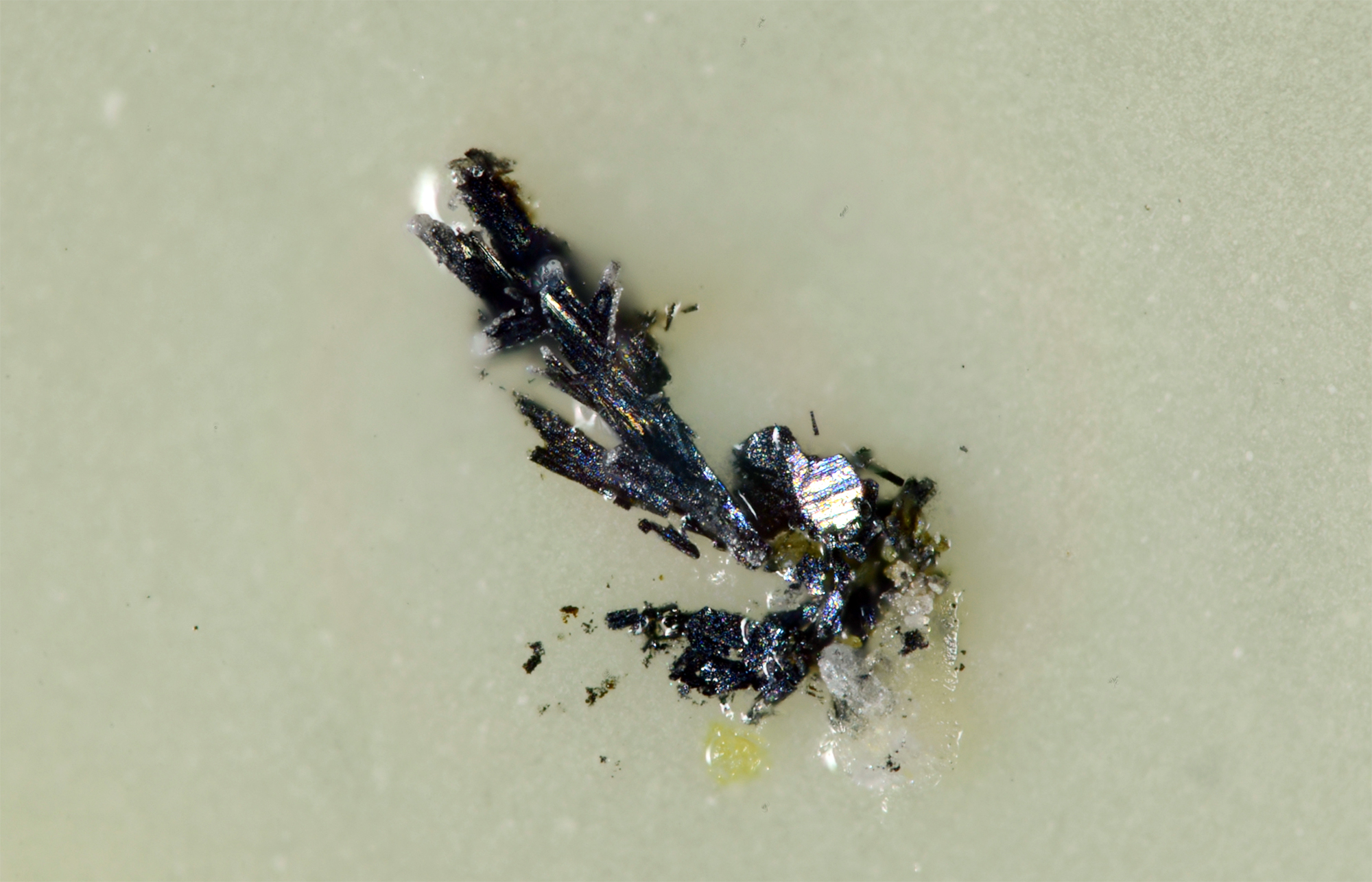

General
- Category: Sulfides and sulfosalts
- Formula: Pb_{2}SnInBiS_{7}
- IMA symbol: Abm
- Strunz classification: 2.HF.25a (10th edition)
- Dana classification: 03.01.03.03
- Crystal system: Triclinic
- Crystal class: Pinacoidal (1̅) (same H-M symbol)
- Space group: P1̅
- Unit cell: a = 23.4 Å, b = 5.77 Å c = 5.83 Å; α = 89.1° β = 89.9°, γ = 91.5°; Z = 4

Identification
- Formula mass: 1,066.44 g/mol
- Color: Silver gray
- Crystal habit: Encrustations – Forms crust-like aggregates on matrix
- Twinning: Lamellar on {100}
- Cleavage: Perfect on {100}
- Luster: Metallic
- Streak: Black
- Diaphaneity: Opaque

Abramovite is a very rare mineral from the sulfides and sulfosalt categories. It has the chemical formula Pb_{2}SnInBiS_{7}. It occurs as tiny elongated lamellar-shaped crystals, up 1 mm × 0.2 mm in size, and is characterized by its non-commensurate structure.

== Etymology and history ==
Abramovite is named after the mineralogist Dmitry Vadimovich Abramov (born 1963) of the A.E. Fersman Museum, Russia.

It was discovered as fumarole crust on the Kudriavy volcano, Iturup Island, Kuril Islands, Russia.

== Formation ==
Abramovite is a product of precipitation from fumarolic gases (600 °C [1,112 °F]) in an active stratovolcano.

== Type occurrence ==
Abramovite comes in small metallic aggregates less than 1 mm across. Abramovite is conserved at A.E. Fersman Mineralogical Museum, Russian Academy of Sciences, Moscow .

The type locality for abramovite is Kudriavy volcano. Minerals associated with abramovite at its type locality are wurtzite, sylvite, halite, galena, and anhydrite.

== Related Minerals ==
Abramovite is a member of the cylindrite group. Other members of this group are:

Cylindrite	Pb_{3}Sn_{4}FeSb_{2}S_{14}	Tric. 1 : P1
Lévyclaudite	Pb_{8}Sn_{7}Cu_{3}(Bi,Sb)_{3}S_{28}	Tric. 1
Merelaniite	Mo_{4}Pb_{4}VSbS_{15}	Tric. 1

Related Minerals (Strunz-mindat Grouping)

2.HF.	Ramosite	Pb_{25.7}Sn_{8.3}Mn_{3.4}Sb_{6.4}S_{56.2}	Mon.
2.HF.20	Vrbaite	Hg_{3}Tl_{4}As_{8}Sb_{2}S_{20}	Orth. mmm (2/m 2/m 2/m) :Cmca
2.HF.25a	Cylindrite	Pb_{3}Sn_{4}FeSb_{2}S_{14}	Tric. 1 : P1
2.HF.25b	Franckeite	Fe^{2+}(Pb,Sn^{2+})_{6}Sn^{4+}_{2}Sb_{2}S_{14}	Tric. 1 : P1
2.HF.25a	Lévyclaudite	Pb_{8}Sn_{7}Cu_{3}(Bi,Sb)_{3}S_{28}	Tric. 1
2.HF.25b	Potosíite	Pb_{6}Sn_{3}FeSb_{3}S_{16}	Tric.
2.HF.25b	Coiraite	(Pb,Sn)_{12.5}Sn_{5}FeAs_{3}S_{28}	Mon.
2.HF.25b v	Plumbostannite	Pb_{2}Fe_{2}Sn_{2}Sb_{2}S_{11}	
2.HF.25a	Merelaniite	Mo_{4}Pb_{4}VSbS_{15}	Tric. 1
2.HF.30	Lengenbachite	Ag_{4}Cu_{2}Pb_{18}As_{12}S_{39}	Tric.

== See also ==
- List of minerals
