= Mohite =

Sulfosalt mineral

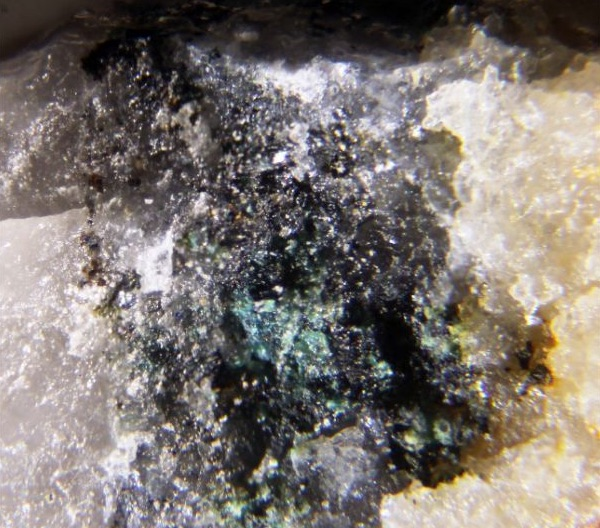

General
- Category: Sulfide mineral
- Formula: Cu_{2}SnS_{3}
- IMA symbol: Moh
- Strunz classification: 2.CB.15b
- Crystal system: Monoclinic
- Crystal class: Domatic (m) (same H-M symbol)
- Space group: Cc
- Unit cell: a = 6.64 Å, b = 11.51 Å, c = 19.93 Å; β = 109.75°; Z = 4

Identification
- Color: Gray with a greenish tint
- Crystal habit: Microscopic grains
- Mohs scale hardness: 4
- Luster: Metallic
- Streak: Gray
- Diaphaneity: Opaque
- Specific gravity: 4.86 (calculated)

Mohite is a copper tin sulfide mineral with the chemical formula Cu_{2}SnS_{3}. It is colored greenish gray and leaves a gray streak. It is opaque and has metallic luster. Its crystal system is triclinic pedial. It is rated 4 on the Mohs Scale and has a specific gravity of 4.86.

== Discovery and occurrence ==
Mohite was first described in 1982 for an occurrence in the Chatkal-Kuramin Mountains of eastern Uzbekistan. It was named after Günter Harald Moh (1929–1993), University of Heidelberg. It is of hydrothermal origin and occurs associated with tetrahedrite, famatinite, kuramite, mawsonite and emplectite in the type locality in Uzbekistan. It has also been reported from Salamanca Province, Spain; the Organullo Mining District of Salta Province, Argentina; and the Delamar Mountains of Lincoln County, Nevada, US.
