= Merelaniite =

Merelaniite is a mineral having the formula Mo_{4}Pb_{4}VSbS_{15}. It is a molybdenum-essential member of the cylindrite group. The first and thus far only samples of merelaniite have been found in the Merelani Tanzanite Deposit, located in the Lelatema Mountains of Tanzania.
