= Mawsonite =

Brownish orange sulfosalt mineral

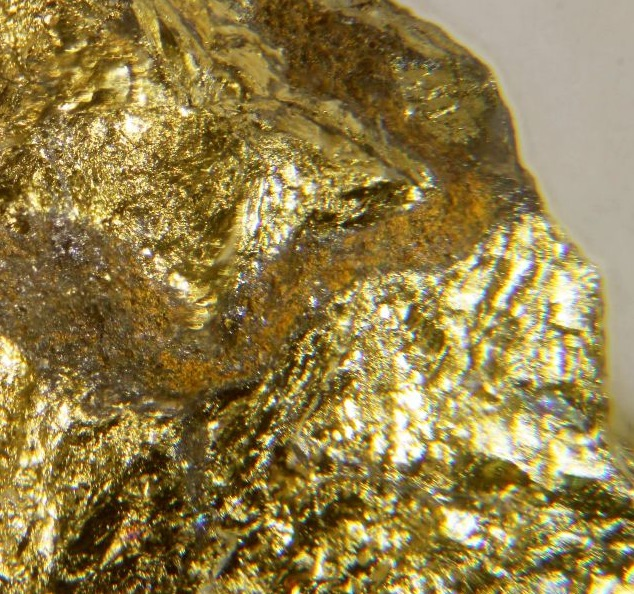
- Mawsonite

General
- Category: Sulfosalt minerals
- Formula: Cu_{6}Fe_{2}SnS_{8}
- IMA symbol: Maw
- Strunz classification: 2.CB.20
- Crystal system: Tetragonal
- Crystal class: Scalenohedral (4̅2m); H-M symbol: (4̅ 2m)
- Space group: P4̅m2
- Unit cell: a = 7.603 Å, c = 5.358 Å, Z = 1; V = 309.72 Å^{3}

Identification
- Color: Brownish orange
- Crystal habit: Exsolution grains within bornite
- Mohs scale hardness: 3.5-4
- Luster: Metallic
- Diaphaneity: Opaque
- Specific gravity: 4.65 (calculated)
- Pleochroism: Strong
- Common impurities: Zn, Se
- Other characteristics: Magnetic

Mawsonite is a brownish orange sulfosalt mineral, containing copper, iron, tin, and sulfur: Cu_{6}Fe_{2}SnS_{8}.

== Discovery and occurrence ==
It was first described in 1965 for occurrences in the Royal George mine, Swinton, Tingha, Hardinge County, New South Wales; and the North Lyell mine, Mount Lyell Mine, Queenstown, Tasmania.

It was named after Australian geologist and Antarctic explorer, Sir Douglas Mawson (1882–1958). It occurs within hydrothermal copper deposits in altered volcanic rocks. It also occurs in skarn deposits and as disseminations in altered granites. It occurs in association with bornite, pyrite, chalcopyrite, chalcocite, digenite, idaite, stannite, stannoidite, pyrrhotite, pentlandite, tennantite, enargite, luzonite–famatinite, kiddcreekite, mohite, native bismuth, galena and sphalerite.
