= Stannoidite =

Sulfide mineral

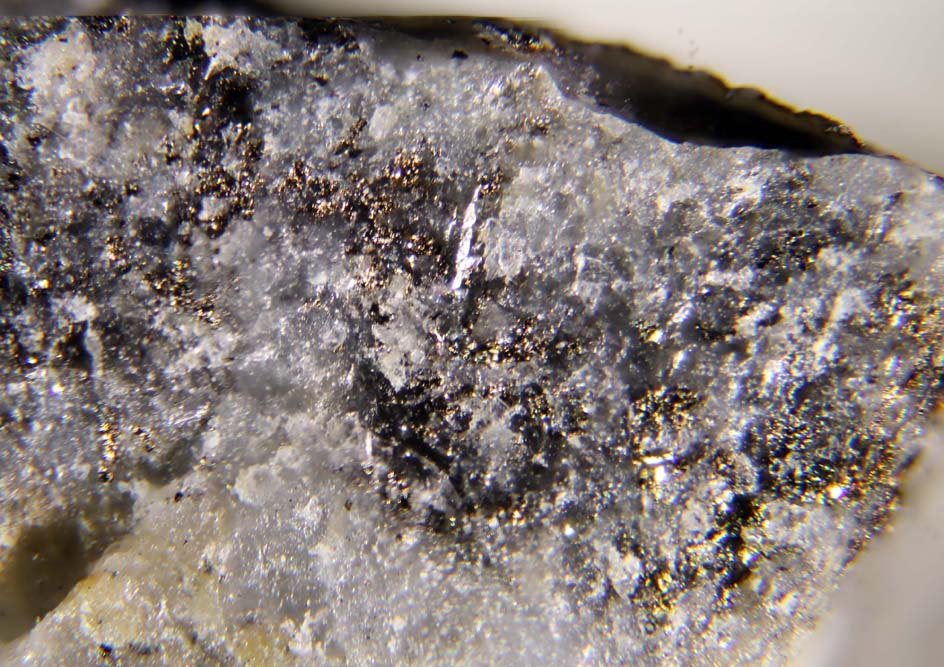
- Silvery stannoidite crystals from the Akenobe Mine, Yabu City, Honshu Island, Japan, associated with chalcopyrite

General
- Category: Sulfide mineral
- Formula: Cu_{6}^{+}Cu_{2}^{2+}(Fe^{2+},Zn)_{3}Sn_{2}S_{12}
- IMA symbol: Sta
- Strunz classification: 2.CB.15c
- Crystal system: Orthorhombic
- Crystal class: Disphenoidal (222); H-M symbol: (2 2 2)
- Space group: I222 (No. 23)
- Unit cell: a = 10.76 Å, b = 5.4 Å c = 16.09 Å, Z = 2

Identification
- Color: Brass brown
- Crystal habit: Uniformly indistinguishable crystals forming large masses
- Cleavage: None
- Fracture: Conchoidal – uneven
- Mohs scale hardness: 4
- Luster: Metallic
- Streak: Brown gray
- Diaphaneity: Opaque
- Specific gravity: 4.29

Stannoidite is a sulfide mineral composed of five chemical elements: copper, iron, zinc, tin and sulfur. Its name originates from Latin stannum (tin) and Greek eides (or Latin oïda meaning "like"). The mineral is found in hydrothermal Cu-Sn deposits.

Stannoidite was first described in 1969 for an occurrence in the Konjo mine, Okayama prefecture, Honshu Island, Japan.

== See also ==
- Stannite
- Kesterite
