= Kochbulak mine =

Gold mine in Navoiy, Uzbekistan

- Location: Navoiy Province, Uzbekistan
- Products: Gold

The Kochbulak mine is one of the largest gold mines in Uzbekistan and in the world. The mine is located in Navoiy Province. The mine has estimated reserves of 3.84 million oz of gold and 12.8 million oz of silver.
