= Kesterite =

Sulfide mineral

Kësterite
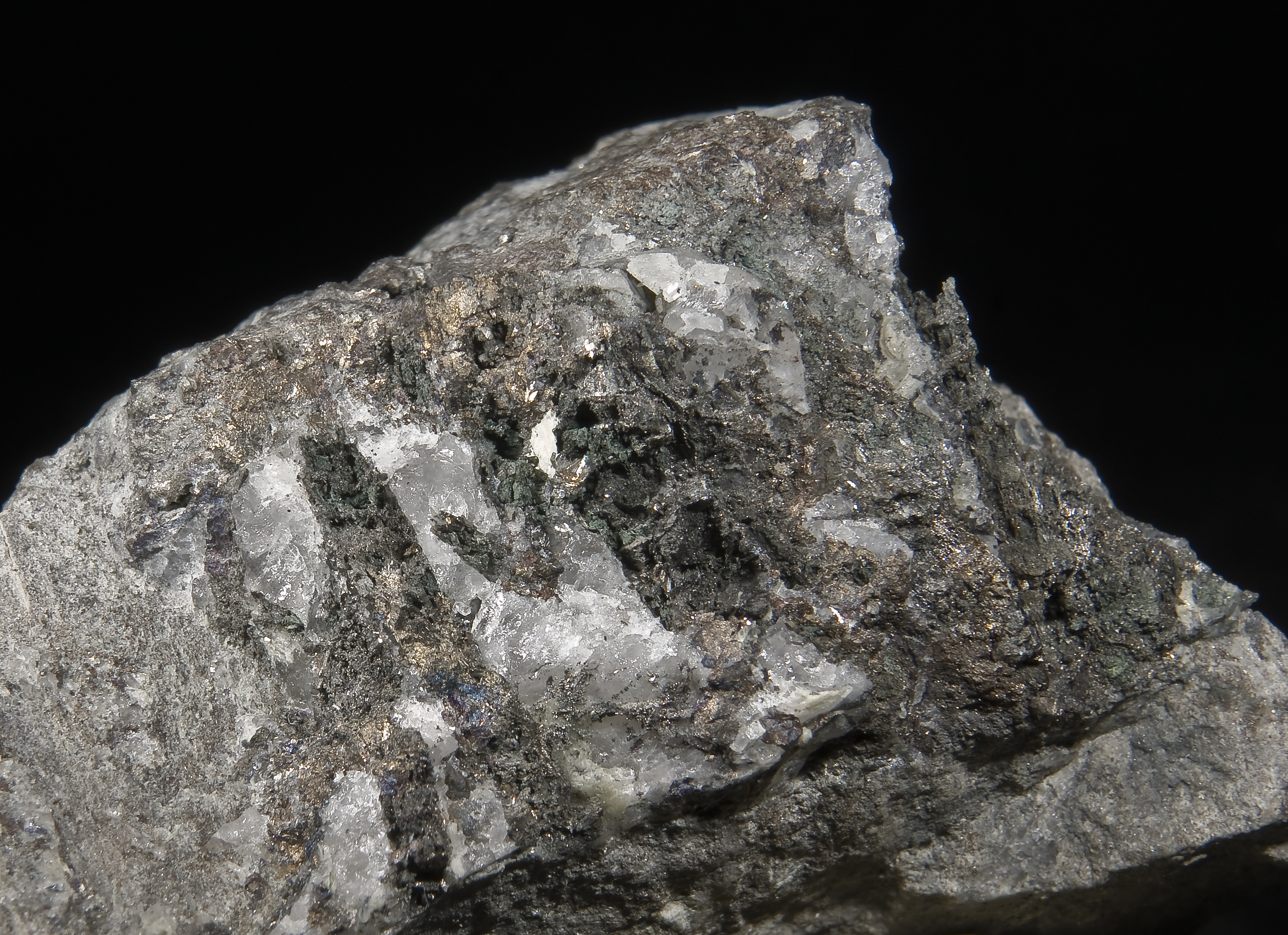

General
- Category: Sulfide mineral
- Formula: Cu2(Zn,Fe)SnS4
- IMA symbol: Kës
- Strunz classification: 2.CB.15a
- Crystal system: Tetragonal
- Crystal class: Disphenoidal (4̅); H-M symbol: (4̅)
- Space group: I4̅
- Unit cell: a = 5.427, c = 10.871 [Å]; Z = 2

Identification
- Color: Greenish black
- Crystal habit: Massive, pseudocubic
- Cleavage: None
- Mohs scale hardness: 4.5
- Luster: Metallic
- Streak: Black
- Diaphaneity: Opaque
- Specific gravity: 4.54–4.59 (meas.); 4.524 (calc.)

Kësterite is a sulfide mineral with a chemical formula of Cu_{2}(Zn,Fe)SnS_{4}. In its lattice structure, zinc and iron atoms share the same lattice sites. Kesterite is the zinc-rich variety whereas the zinc-poor form is called ferrokesterite or stannite. Owing to their similarity, kesterite is sometimes called isostannite. The synthetic form of kesterite is abbreviated as CZTS (from copper-zinc-tin sulfide). The name kesterite is sometimes extended to include this synthetic material and also CZTSe, which contains selenium instead of sulfur. Along with perovskite, recent advances have made kesterite promising materials for solar panels.

== Occurrence ==
Kesterite was first described in 1958 in regard to an occurrence in the Kester deposit and the associated locality in Ynnakh Mountain, Yana basin, Yakutia, Russia, where it was discovered.

It is usually found in quartz-sulfide hydrothermal veins associated with tin ore deposits. Associated minerals include arsenopyrite, stannoidite, chalcopyrite, chalcocite, sphalerite and tennantite.

Stannite and kesterite occur together in the Ivittuut cryolite deposit of southern Greenland. Solid solutions form between Cu_{2}FeSnS_{4} and Cu_{2}ZnSnS_{4} at temperatures above 680 °C. This accounts for the exsolved kesterite in stannite found in the cryolite.

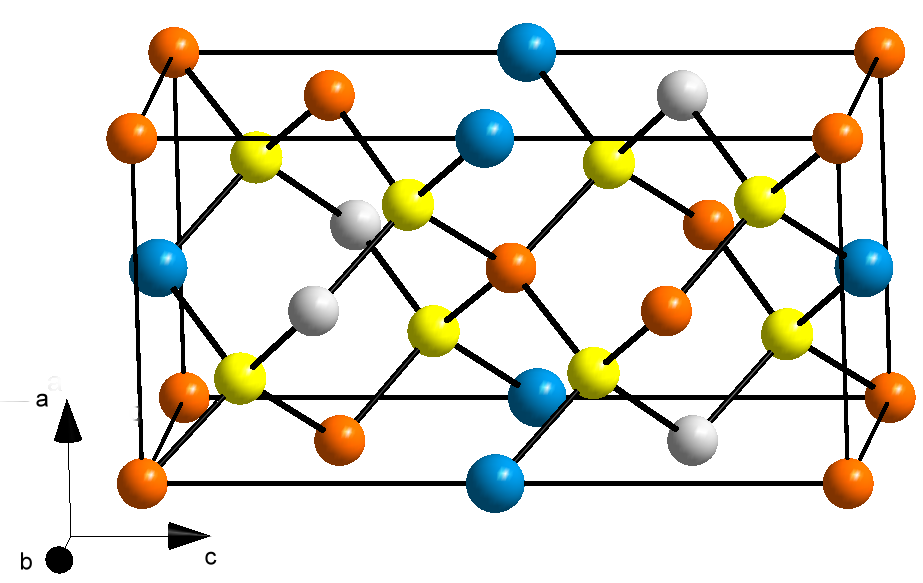
Kesterite structure. Orange: Cu, blue: Sn, grey: Zn/Fe, yellow: S

== Use ==
Kesterite-like substances are being researched as a solar photovoltaic material.
