= Cylindrite =

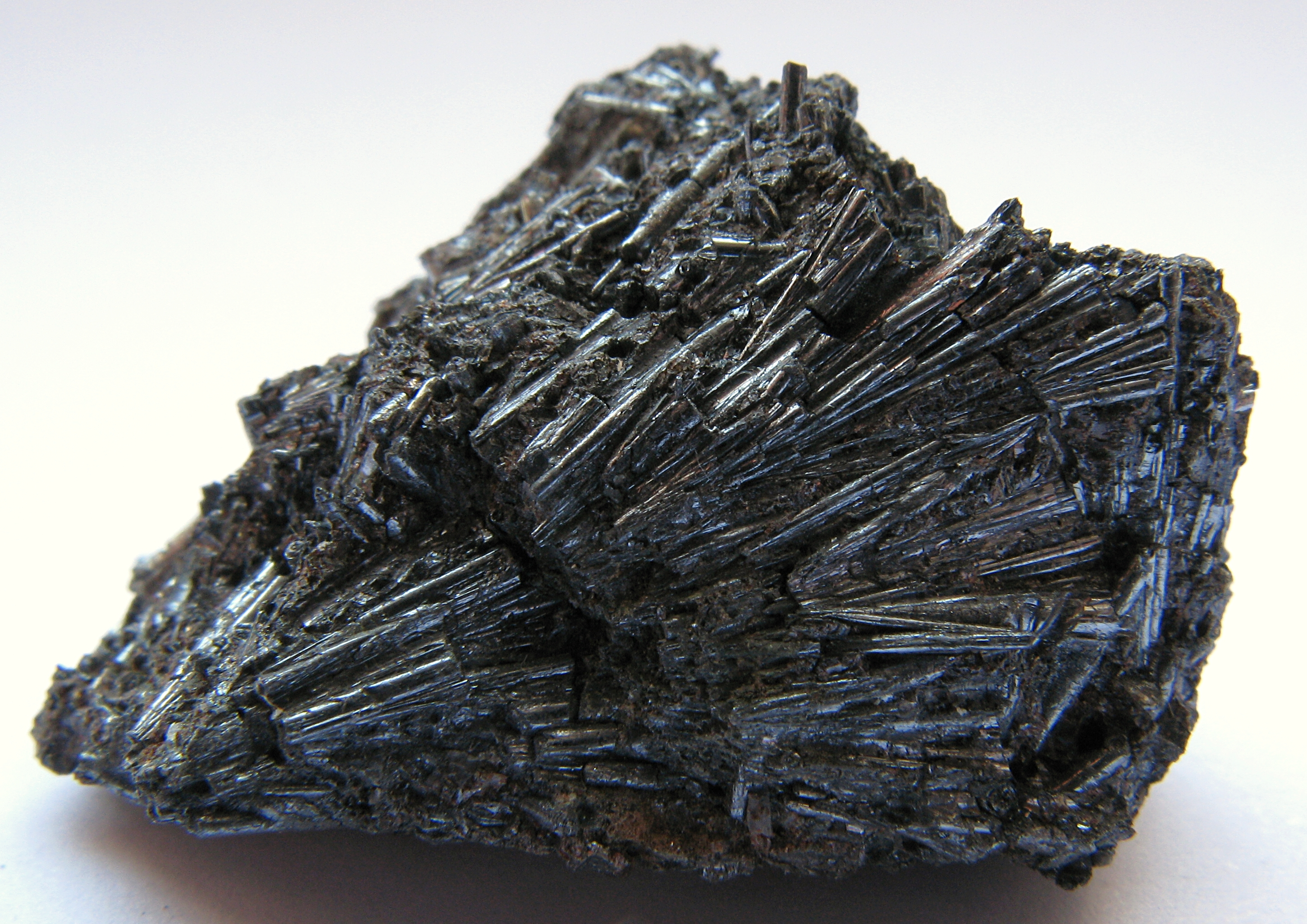

General
- Category: Sulfosalt minerals
- Formula: Pb_{3}Sn_{4}FeSb_{2}S_{14}
- IMA symbol: Cy
- Strunz classification: 2.HF.25a
- Dana classification: 03.01.04.01
- Crystal system: Triclinic

Identification
- Formula mass: 1,844.71 g/mol
- Colour: Lead grey, greyish black
- Crystal habit: Cylindrical
- Cleavage: Perfect on {100}
- Tenacity: Malleable
- Mohs scale hardness: 2 1/2
- Lustre: Metallic
- Streak: Black
- Diaphaneity: Opaque
- Specific gravity: 5.4 – 5.42

Cylindrite is a sulfosalt mineral containing tin, lead, antimony and iron with formula: Pb_{3}Sn_{4}FeSb_{2}S_{14}. It forms triclinic pinacoidal crystals which often occur as tubes or cylinders which are in fact rolled sheets. It has a black to lead grey metallic colour with a Mohs hardness of 2 to 3 and a specific gravity of 5.4.

It was first discovered in the Santa Cruz mine, Oruro Department, Bolivia in 1893. The name arises from its curious cylindrical crystal which it forms almost uniquely among minerals.

== See also ==
- Classification of minerals
- List of minerals
