= Stannite =

Mineral

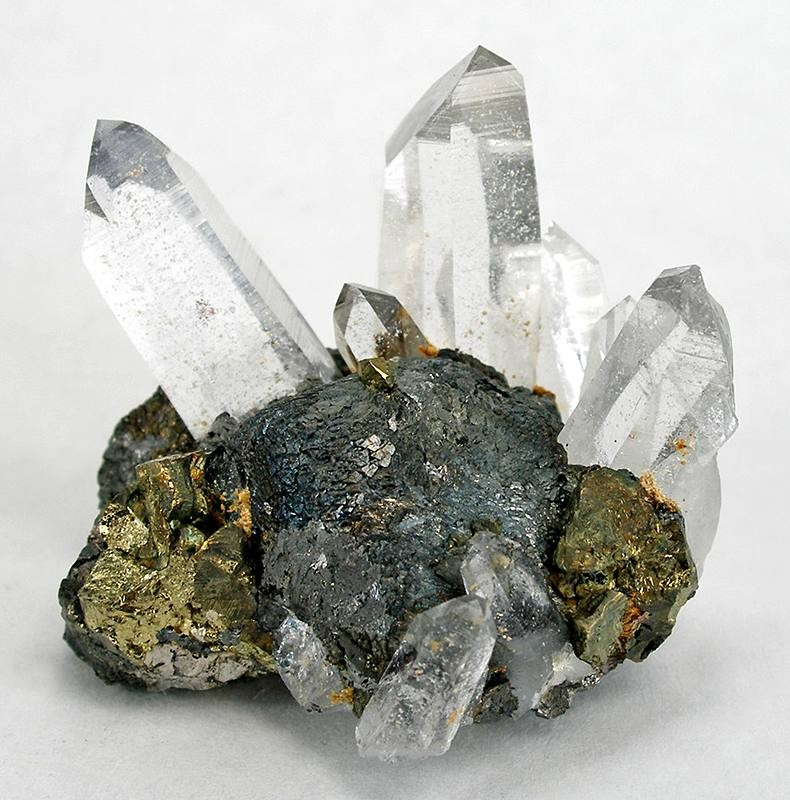

General
- Category: Sulfide mineral
- Formula: Cu_{2}FeSnS_{4}
- IMA symbol: Stn
- Strunz classification: 2.CB.15a
- Crystal system: Tetragonal
- Crystal class: Scalenohedral (4̅2m); H-M symbol: (4̅ 2m)
- Space group: I4̅2m
- Unit cell: a = 5.4432, c = 10.7299 [Å]; Z = 2

Identification
- Color: Steel-gray to iron-black, may tarnish blue
- Crystal habit: Rarely as pseudo-octahedral crystals also massive, granular, and disseminated
- Twinning: Penetration twins on {102}
- Cleavage: Indistinct on {110} and {001}
- Fracture: Uneven
- Mohs scale hardness: 4
- Luster: Metallic
- Streak: Black
- Diaphaneity: Opaque
- Specific gravity: 4.3 – 4.5

Stannite is a mineral, a sulfide of copper, iron, and tin, in the category of thiostannates.

== Background ==
The chemical formula is Cu_{2}FeSnS_{4}. Zinc commonly occurs with the iron and trace germanium may be present. Stannite is used as an ore of tin, consisting of approximately 28% tin, 13% iron, 30% copper, 30% sulfur by mass. It is found in tin-bearing, hydrothermal vein deposits occurring with chalcopyrite, sphalerite, tetrahedrite, arsenopyrite, pyrite, cassiterite, and wolframite.

It is also known as bell metal ore as tin is an important constituent of bell metal. It is thought the exploitation of tin deposits in Cornwall led to an expansion in bell founding.

The name comes from the Latin for tin: stannum. It was first described in 1797 for an occurrence in Wheal Rock, St. Agnes, Cornwall, England.

== See also ==
- Kesterite
